= Rubber glove =

Glove made out of rubber

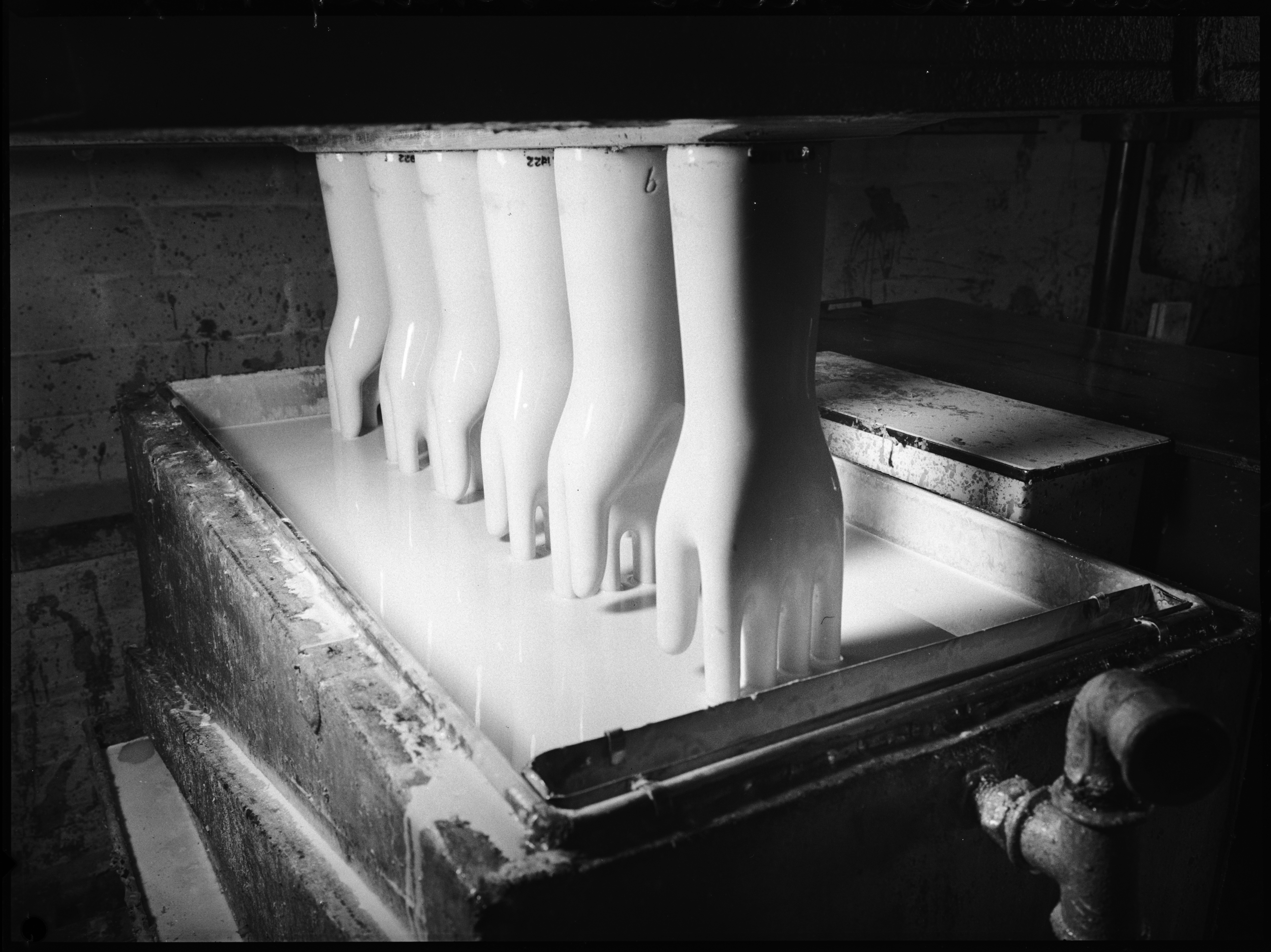
Rubber glove manufacture, Sydney, 1939

A rubber glove is a glove made out of natural or synthetic rubber. 'Rubber' refers to durable, waterproof, and elastic material made from natural or synthetic latex. Rubber gloves can be unsupported (rubber only) or supported (rubber coating of textile glove). Its primary purpose is the protection of the hands while performing tasks involving chemicals. Rubber gloves can be worn during dishwashing to protect the hands from detergent and allow the use of hotter water. Health professionals use medical gloves rather than rubber gloves when performing surgical operations.

== Origin ==
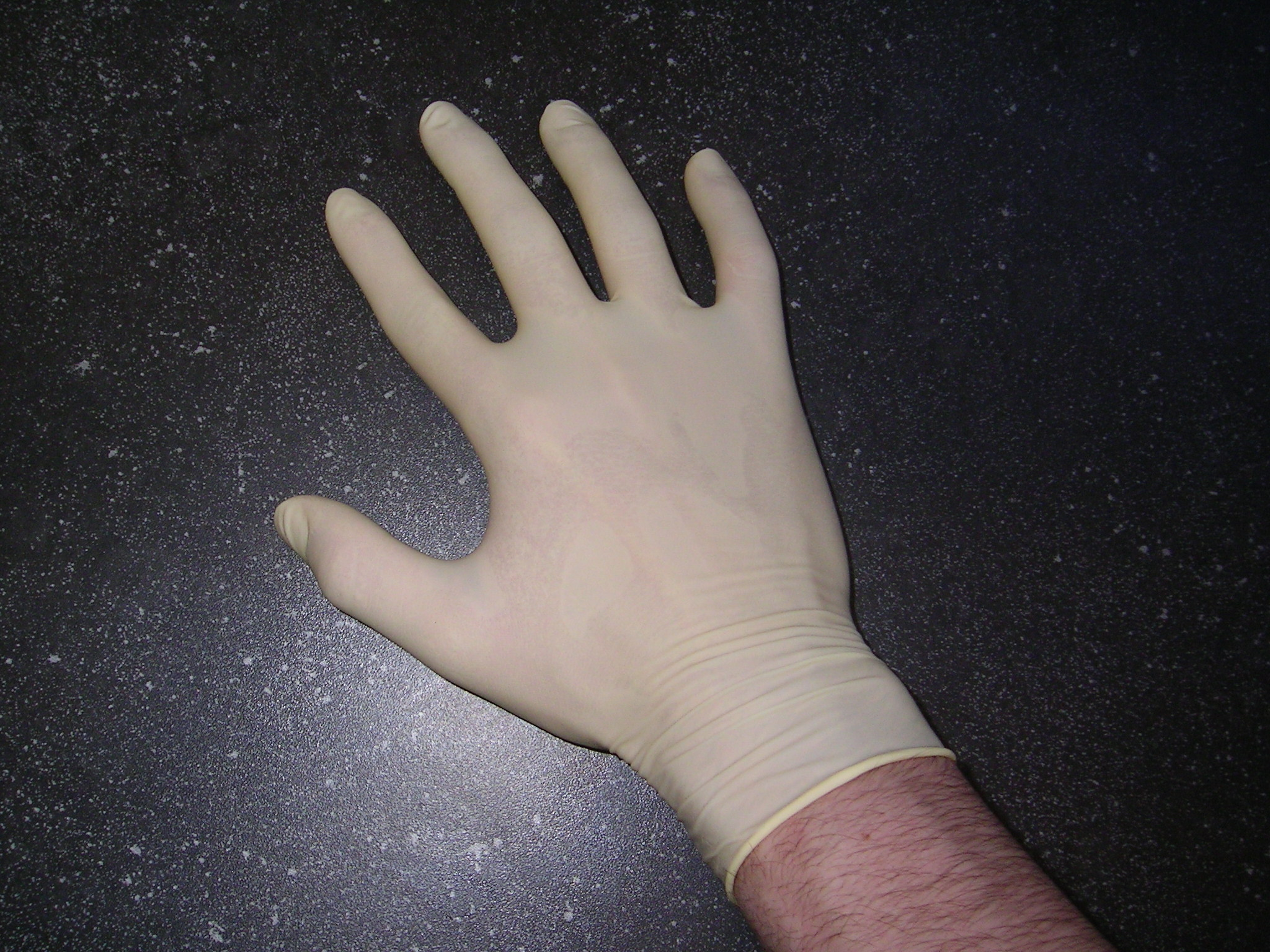
A latex glove

In 1894, William Stewart Halsted, the first chief of surgery at Johns Hopkins Hospital, invented rubber gloves for his wife Caroline Hampton as he noticed her hands were affected so strongly by the antiseptic she dunked her hands in, that she was almost unable to perform her tasks. However, the first modern disposable glove was invented by Ansell Rubber Co. Pty. Ltd. in 1965.

== Household use ==
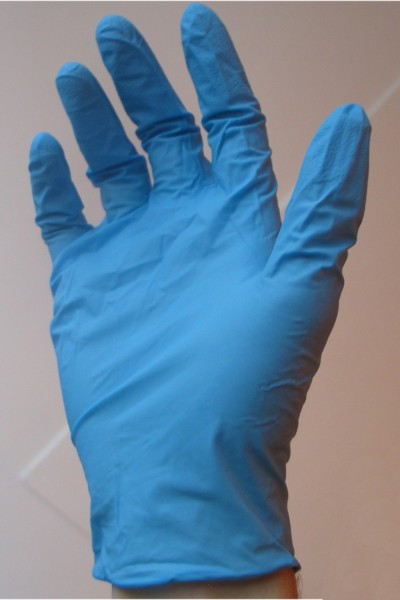
A disposable nitrile rubber glove

Household rubber gloves have been used for washing dishes and cleaning in the home since the 1960s. Many different designs of gloves have been available in many colors, but traditional designs are yellow or pink with long cuffs. While these remain the most popular patterns today, gloves can be obtained that range from wrist-length to those that are shoulder-length. There are even gloves that are pre-attached to shirts and bodysuits for added protection.

Rubber gloves are best worn with a skin-tight fit which, while still allowing for the hands to breathe, makes it easier to hold objects and manipulate them. The palms and fingers usually have a raised pattern which helps provide a good grip when handling objects. Wearing gloves protects the hands from harsh detergents and other cleaning products that are used in the home and elsewhere.

These gloves are traditionally used by people cleaning in the home and are popular with professional cleaners and for clearing up in shops, cafes, and other public places. The thickness of the gloves and the long cuffs provide excellent protection for all general cleaning tasks and are useful for all chores where the hands need to be put into water, and provide protection when vacuuming, dusting, and polishing.

The most common material used for making household gloves is latex, a form of rubber. Usually, the gloves have a cotton "flock" lining for easily taking them on and off. They are available in a wider range of colors and cuff lengths. Problems with latex rubber include allergic reactions and poor protection against such substances as solvents. Other materials used to alleviate this are PVC, nitrile, and neoprene. Natural rubber that has been chemically treated to reduce the amount of antibody generators, such as Vytex Natural Rubber Latex, can be used to produce a glove that retains the properties of traditional rubber while exposing the user to significantly reduced amounts of latex allergens.

Gloves are used in the service industry to minimize contact with ready-to-eat foods. Generally, food service employees are required to wash their hands before starting work or putting on single-use gloves. Due to the incidence of latex allergies, many people switch to vinyl or nitrile gloves. Poly gloves are a very inexpensive alternative. Latex, vinyl, and nitrile gloves are available in powder and powder-free varieties. The powder in the gloves is made of USDA cornstarch. Powder-free gloves are generally more expensive than powdered gloves because gloves must be powdered to be removed from the mold they are made on. The majority of disposable gloves are manufactured in China, Malaysia, Indonesia, and Vietnam.

Disposable nitrile gloves are also widely used outside healthcare and food service, notably in motor vehicle repair. Frequent and prolonged contact with used engine oil may cause dermatitis and other skin disorders, including skin cancer, and the UK Health and Safety Executive (HSE) illustrates nitrile gloves as a means of reducing hand contamination. For handling lubricants and waste oil, HSE guidance recommends vinyl or nitrile gloves, accepts single-use gloves for this work, and advises discarding them every time they are taken off. Disposable nitrile gloves are likewise advised where short-term contact with benzene, for example from splashing, is possible. Where wet or oily objects are handled, HSE advises choosing gloves with a roughened or textured surface for grip, noting that thicker gloves generally give greater protection while thinner ones allow better dexterity. Because no glove material protects against all substances, nor against any specific substance indefinitely, selection should rely on the manufacturer's breakthrough time, permeation rate and degradation data for the chemicals being handled.

== Use to hide fingerprints ==
Criminals sometimes wear gloves while committing crimes to avoid leaving fingerprints, which can be used as evidence against them. When thin gloves are used, however, fingerprints may pass through as glove prints, thus transferring the wearers' prints onto surfaces. Fingerprints are also left on the glove itself, and it is possible to develop latent fingerprints from gloves left at or near the scene of a crime. The sex of the person wearing the glove can be accurately determined from a glove print.

== Limitations ==
Karen Wetterhahn was killed by mercury poisoning after a few drops of dimethylmercury landed on her glove during an experiment. Tests later showed that dimethylmercury, a small apolar molecule, can rapidly permeate different kinds of latex gloves and enter the skin within about 15 seconds. Wetterhahn's death led to much greater awareness of the problems of glove porosity in chemical safety, leading to mandates for the use of plastic-laminate gloves (SilverShield) for handling dimethylmercury and produced a lasting and significant improvement in laboratory safety.

== See also ==
- Glove
- Medical glove
- Finger cot
- Latex allergy
