= Condom =

Device for birth control and STI prevention

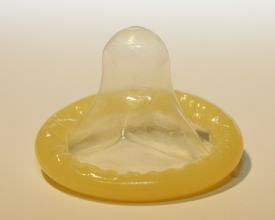
- A rolled-up condom

Background
- Pronunciation: /ˈkɒndəm/ KON-dəm or UK: /ˈkɒndɒm/ KON-dom
- Type: Barrier
- First use: Ancient; Rubber: 1855; Latex: 1920s Polyurethane: 1994; Polyisoprene: 2008

Pregnancy rates (first year, latex)
- Perfect use: 2%
- Typical use: 18%

Usage
- Reversibility: Yes
- User reminders: Latex condoms are damaged by oil-based lubricants

Advantages and disadvantages
- STI protection: Yes
- Benefits: No health care visits required and low cost

A condom is a sheath-shaped barrier device used during sexual intercourse to reduce the probability of pregnancy or a sexually transmitted infection (STI). There are both external condoms, also called male condoms, and internal (female) condoms.

The external condom is rolled onto an erect penis before intercourse and works by forming a physical barrier which limits skin-to-skin contact, exposure to fluids, and blocks semen from entering the body of a sexual partner. External condoms are typically made from latex and, less commonly, from polyurethane, polyisoprene, or lamb intestine. External condoms have the advantages of ease of use, ease of access, and few side effects. Individuals with latex allergy should use condoms made from a material other than latex, such as polyurethane. Internal condoms are typically made from polyurethane and may be used multiple times.

With proper use—and use at every act of intercourse—women whose partners use external condoms experience a 2% per-year pregnancy rate. With typical use, the rate of pregnancy is 18% per-year. Their use greatly decreases the risk of gonorrhea, chlamydia, trichomoniasis, hepatitis B, and HIV/AIDS. To a lesser extent, they also protect against genital herpes, human papillomavirus (HPV), and syphilis.

Condoms as a method of preventing STIs have been used since at least 1564. Rubber condoms became available in 1855, followed by latex condoms in the 1920s. It is on the World Health Organization's List of Essential Medicines. As of 2019, globally around 21% of those using birth control use condoms, making it the second-most common method after female sterilization (24%). Rates of condom use are highest in East and Southeast Asia, Europe and North America.

== Medical uses ==
=== Birth control ===
The effectiveness of condoms, as of most forms of contraception, can be assessed two ways. Perfect use or method effectiveness rates only include people who use condoms properly and consistently. Actual use, or typical use effectiveness rates are of all condom users, including those who use condoms incorrectly or do not use condoms at every act of intercourse. Rates are generally presented for the first year of use. Most commonly the Pearl Index is used to calculate effectiveness rates, but some studies use decrement tables.

The typical use pregnancy rate among condom users varies depending on the population being studied, ranging from 10 to 18% per year. The perfect use pregnancy rate of condoms is 2% per year. Condoms may be combined with other forms of contraception (such as spermicide) for greater protection.

=== Sexually transmitted infections ===
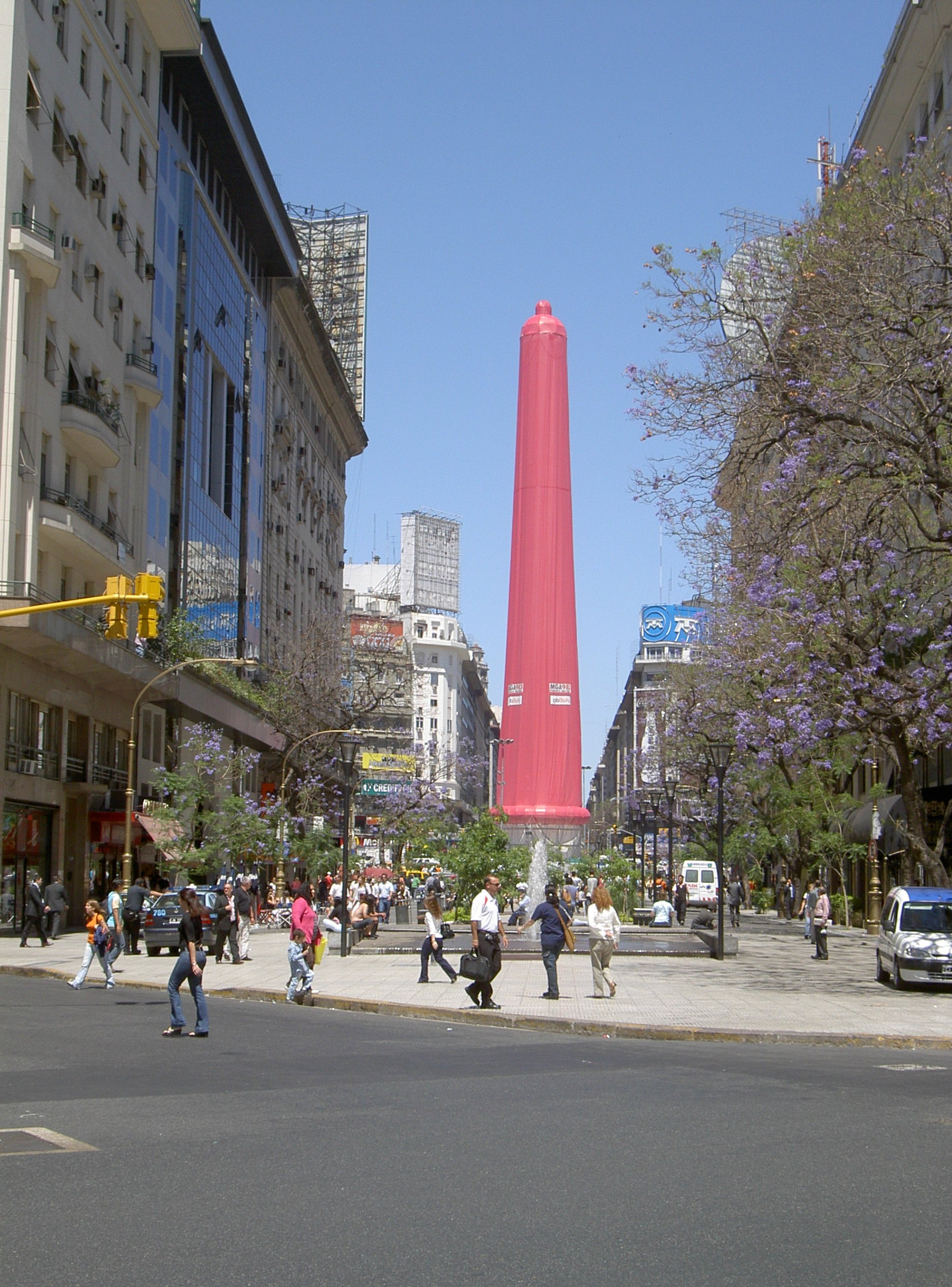
A giant replica of a condom on the Obelisk of Buenos Aires, Argentina, part of an awareness campaign for the 2005 World AIDS Day

Condoms are widely recommended for the prevention of sexually transmitted infections (STIs). They have been shown to be effective in reducing infection rates in both men and women. While not perfect, the condom is effective at reducing the transmission of organisms that cause AIDS, genital herpes, cervical cancer, genital warts, syphilis, chlamydia, gonorrhea, and other diseases. Condoms are often recommended as an adjunct to more effective birth control methods (such as IUD) in situations where STI protection is also desired.

According to a 2000 report by the National Institutes of Health (NIH), consistent use of latex condoms reduces the risk of HIV transmission by approximately 85% relative to risk when unprotected, putting the seroconversion rate (infection rate) at 0.9 per 100 person-years with condom, down from 6.7 per 100 person-years. Analysis published in 2007 from the University of Texas Medical Branch and the World Health Organization found similar risk reductions of 80–95%.

The 2000 NIH review concluded that condom use significantly reduces the risk of gonorrhea for men. A 2006 study reports that proper condom use decreases the risk of transmission of human papillomavirus (HPV) to women by approximately 70%. Another study in the same year found consistent condom use was effective at reducing transmission of herpes simplex virus-2, also known as genital herpes, in both men and women.

Although a condom is effective in limiting exposure, some disease transmission may occur even with a condom. Infectious areas of the genitals, especially when symptoms are present, may not be covered by a condom, and as a result, some diseases like HPV and herpes may be transmitted by direct contact. The primary effectiveness issue with using condoms to prevent STIs, however, is inconsistent use.

Condoms may also be useful in treating potentially precancerous cervical changes. Exposure to human papillomavirus, even in individuals already infected with the virus, appears to increase the risk of precancerous changes. The use of condoms helps promote regression of these changes. In addition, researchers in the UK suggest that a hormone in semen can aggravate existing cervical cancer, condom use during sex can prevent exposure to the hormone.

=== Causes of failure ===
Erect penis in a yellow condom

Condoms may slip off the penis after ejaculation, break due to improper application or physical damage (such as tears caused when opening the package), or break or slip due to latex degradation (typically from usage past the expiration date, improper storage, or exposure to oils). The rate of breakage is between 0.4% and 2.3%, while the rate of slippage is between 0.6% and 1.3%. Even if no breakage or slippage is observed, 1–3% of women will test positive for semen residue after intercourse with a condom. Failure rates are higher for anal sex, and until 2022, condoms were only approved by the FDA for vaginal sex. The One Male Condom received FDA approval for anal sex on 23 February 2022.

Different modes of condom failure result in different levels of semen exposure. If a failure occurs during application, the damaged condom may be disposed of and a new condom applied before intercourse begins – such failures generally pose no risk to the user. One study found that semen exposure from a broken condom was about half that of unprotected intercourse; semen exposure from a slipped condom was about one-fifth that of unprotected intercourse.

Standard condoms will fit almost any penis, with varying degrees of comfort or risk of slippage. Many condom manufacturers offer "snug" or "magnum" sizes. Some manufacturers also offer custom sized-to-fit condoms, with claims that they are more reliable and offer improved sensation/comfort. Some studies have associated larger penises and smaller condoms with increased breakage and decreased slippage rates (and vice versa), but other studies have been inconclusive.

It is recommended for condoms manufacturers to avoid very thick or very thin condoms, because they are both considered less effective. Some authors encourage users to choose thinner condoms "for greater durability, sensation, and comfort", but others warn that "the thinner the condom, the smaller the force required to break it".

Experienced condom users are significantly less likely to have a condom slip or break compared to first-time users, although users who experience one slippage or breakage are more likely to suffer a second such failure. An article in Population Reports suggests that education on condom use reduces behaviors that increase the risk of breakage and slippage. A Family Health International publication also offers the view that education can reduce the risk of breakage and slippage, but emphasizes that more research needs to be done to determine all of the causes of breakage and slippage.

Among people who intend condoms to be their form of birth control, pregnancy may occur when the user has sex without a condom. The person may have run out of condoms, or be traveling and not have a condom with them, or dislike the feel of condoms and decide to "take a chance". This behavior is the primary cause of typical use failure (as opposed to method or perfect use failure).

Another possible cause of condom failure is sabotage. One motive is to have a child against a partner's wishes or consent. Some commercial sex workers from Nigeria reported clients sabotaging condoms in retaliation for being coerced into condom use. Using a fine needle to make several pinholes at the tip of the condom is believed to significantly impact on their effectiveness. Cases of such condom sabotage have occurred.

==== Use of multiple condoms ("double bagging") ====
"Double bagging", the practice of using two condoms at once, might increase or decrease the risk of sperm leaking through; expert opinions are divided, and it may depend on additional factors. Using two condoms may increase the risk of slippage, though the condoms often become stuck together after use. It may also increase the chance of tearing or breaking if there is friction between the condoms. However, lubricant can be added between the condoms to decrease friction. If multiple condoms are used, an exposure break only occurs if all of the condoms are broken.

A literature review in Contraceptive Technology Update recommends that "When clinicians see women and men who have experienced multiple breaks or slippages, it would be wise to encourage them to use two condoms." A literature review by Planned Parenthood concludes that "It seems that there is no evidence-based information to support advising against double bagging. On the other hand, the evidence to support double bagging is limited, but positive. It may be best to advise that if double bagging increases a person's sense of comfort and security, there is no harm in using more than one condom, and there may be benefits."

With two latex condoms, heat and friction can cause them to disintegrate; however, layering a lambskin condom and a latex condom can be helpful if one of the partners is allergic to latex. For sex workers, presenting clients with a leading question, such as the choice between one or two condoms, or between a male or a female condom, is often easier than directly requesting that they use a condom, and makes it more likely that a condom will be used. Using multiple condoms, especially more than two, may decrease pleasure, prolong intercourse, and/or cause irritation to a woman's vagina. The use of multiple condoms is a behavioral therapy for treating premature ejaculation, though it is not always sufficient.

In summary, the consensus seems to be that using two condoms instead of one usually decreases risk if properly lubricated but increases risk if not, and that using more condoms generally results in less sexual stimulation for men.

== Side effects ==
The use of latex condoms by people with an allergy to latex can cause allergic symptoms, such as skin irritation. In people with severe latex allergies, using a latex condom can potentially be life-threatening. Repeated use of latex condoms can also cause the development of a latex allergy in some people. Irritation may also occur due to spermicides that may be present.

== Use ==
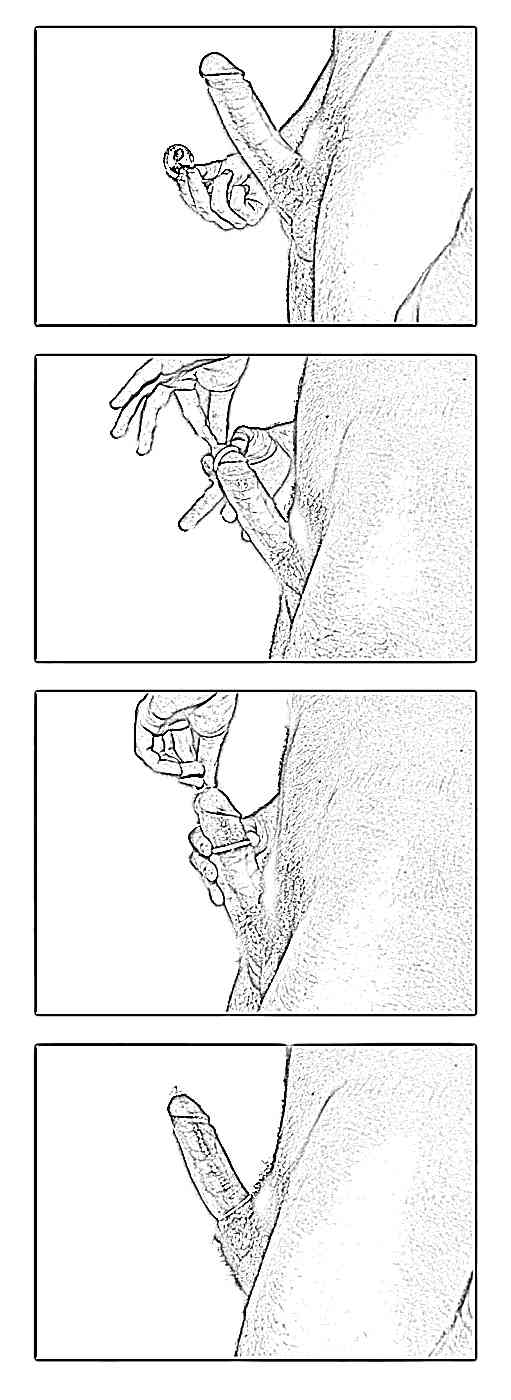
Illustrations showing how to put on a condom

External condoms are usually packaged inside a foil or plastic wrapper, in a rolled-up form, and are designed to be applied to the tip of the penis and then unrolled over the erect penis. It is important that the closed end or the teat of the condom is pinched when the condom is placed on the tip of the penis. This will ensure that air is not trapped inside the condom which could cause it to burst during intercourse. In addition, this leaves space for the semen to collect which reduces the risk of it being forced out of the base of the device. Most condoms have a teat end for this purpose. Soon after ejaculating and whilst the penis is still erect, the male should withdraw from his partner's body. This to avoid semen seeping from the condom as the penis becomes more flaccid. The condom should then be carefully removed from the penis away from the other partner. It is recommended that the condom be wrapped in tissue or tied in a knot, then disposed of in a trash receptacle. Condoms are used to reduce the likelihood of pregnancy during intercourse and to reduce the likelihood of contracting sexually transmitted infections (STIs). Condoms are also used during fellatio to reduce the likelihood of contracting STIs.

Some couples find that putting on a condom interrupts sex, although others incorporate condom application as part of their foreplay. Some men and women find the physical barrier of a condom dulls sensation. Advantages of dulled sensation can include prolonged erection and delayed ejaculation; disadvantages might include a loss of some sexual excitement. Advocates of condom use also cite their advantages of being inexpensive, easy to use, and having few side effects.

=== Adult film industry ===
In 2012 proponents gathered 372,000 voter signatures through a citizens' initiative in Los Angeles County to put Measure B on the 2012 ballot. As a result, Measure B, a law requiring the use of condoms in the production of pornographic films, was passed. This requirement has received much criticism and is said by some to be counter-productive, merely forcing companies that make pornographic films to relocate to other places without this requirement. Producers claim that condom use depresses sales.

=== Sex education ===
Condoms are often used in sex education programs, because they have the capability to reduce the chances of pregnancy and the spread of some sexually transmitted infections when used correctly. A recent American Psychological Association (APA) press release supported the inclusion of information about condoms in sex education, saying "comprehensive sexuality education programs ... discuss the appropriate use of condoms", and "promote condom use for those who are sexually active."

In the United States, teaching about condoms in public schools is opposed by some religious organizations. Planned Parenthood, which advocates family planning and sex education, argues that no studies have shown abstinence-only programs to result in delayed intercourse, and cites surveys showing that 76% of American parents want their children to receive comprehensive sexuality education including condom use.

=== Infertility treatment ===
Common procedures in infertility treatment such as semen analysis and intrauterine insemination (IUI) require collection of semen samples. These are most commonly obtained through masturbation, but an alternative to masturbation is use of a special collection condom to collect semen during sexual intercourse.

Collection condoms are made from silicone or polyurethane, as latex is somewhat harmful to sperm. Some religions prohibit masturbation entirely. Also, compared with samples obtained from masturbation, semen samples from collection condoms have higher total sperm counts, sperm motility, and percentage of sperm with normal morphology. For this reason, they are believed to give more accurate results when used for semen analysis, and to improve the chances of pregnancy when used in procedures such as intracervical or intrauterine insemination. Adherents of religions that prohibit contraception, such as Catholicism, may use collection condoms with holes pricked in them.

For fertility treatments, a collection condom may be used to collect semen during sexual intercourse where the semen is provided by the woman's partner. Private sperm donors may also use a collection condom to obtain samples through masturbation or by sexual intercourse with a partner and will transfer the ejaculate from the collection condom to a specially designed container. The sperm is transported in such containers, in the case of a donor, to a recipient woman to be used for insemination, and in the case of a woman's partner, to a fertility clinic for processing and use. However, transportation may reduce the fecundity of the sperm. Collection condoms may also be used where semen is produced at a sperm bank or fertility clinic.

Condom therapy is sometimes prescribed to infertile couples when the female has high levels of antisperm antibodies. The theory is that preventing exposure to her partner's semen will lower her level of antisperm antibodies, and thus increase her chances of pregnancy when condom therapy is discontinued. However, condom therapy has not been shown to increase subsequent pregnancy rates.

=== Other uses ===
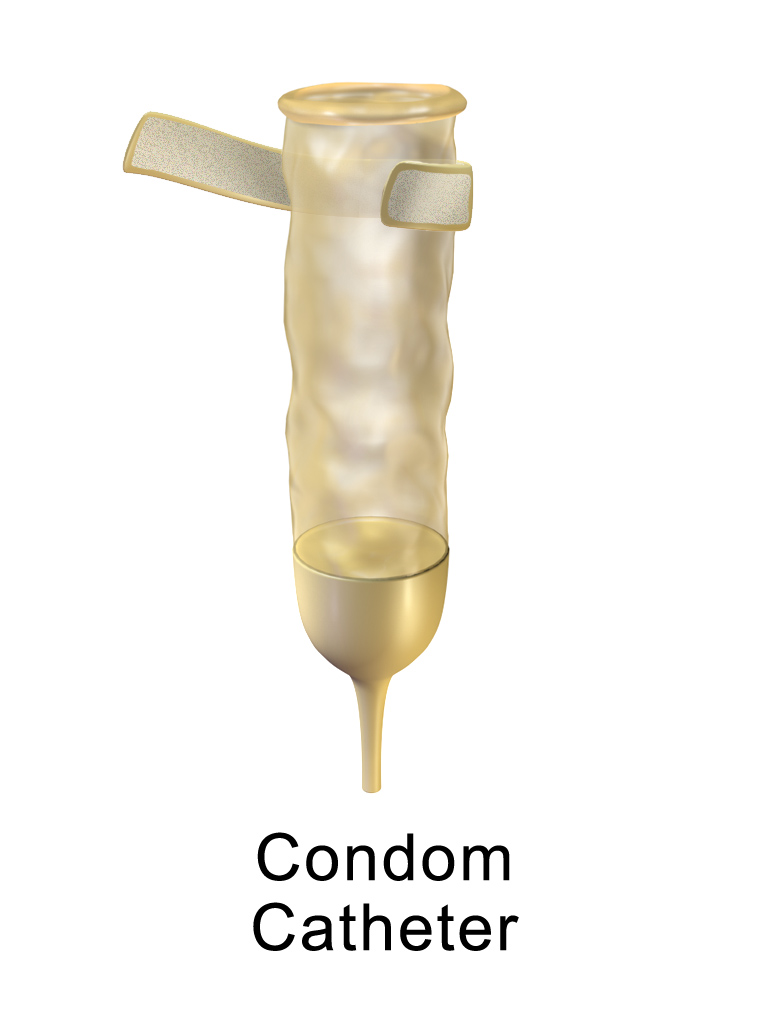
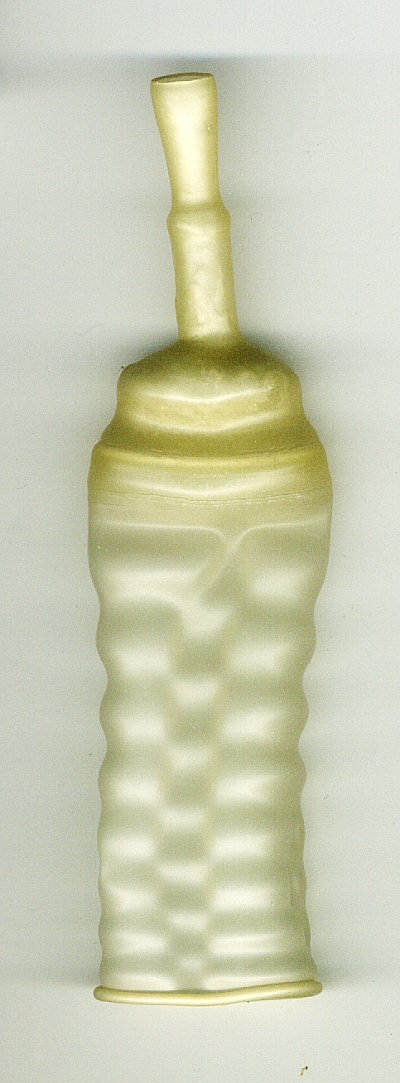
Condom catheters are worn to collect urine.

Condoms excel as multipurpose containers and barriers because they are waterproof, elastic, durable, and (for military and espionage uses) will not arouse suspicion if found.

Ongoing military utilization began during World War II, and includes covering the muzzles of rifle barrels to prevent fouling, the waterproofing of firing assemblies in underwater demolitions, and storage of corrosive materials and garrotes by paramilitary agencies.

Condoms have also been used to smuggle alcohol, cocaine, heroin, and other drugs across borders and into prisons by filling the condom with drugs, tying it in a knot and then either swallowing it or inserting it into the rectum. These methods are very dangerous and potentially lethal; if the condom breaks, the drugs inside become absorbed into the bloodstream and can cause an overdose.

Medically, condoms can be used to cover endovaginal ultrasound probes, or in field chest needle decompressions they can be used to make a one-way valve.

Condoms have also been used to protect scientific samples from the environment, and to waterproof microphones for underwater recording.

== Types ==
Most condoms have a reservoir tip or teat end, making it easier to accommodate the man's ejaculate. Condoms come in different sizes and shapes.

They also come in a variety of surfaces intended to stimulate the user's partner. Condoms are usually supplied with a lubricant coating to facilitate penetration, while flavored condoms are principally used for oral sex. As mentioned above, most condoms are made of latex, but polyurethane and lambskin condoms also exist.

=== Internal condom ===
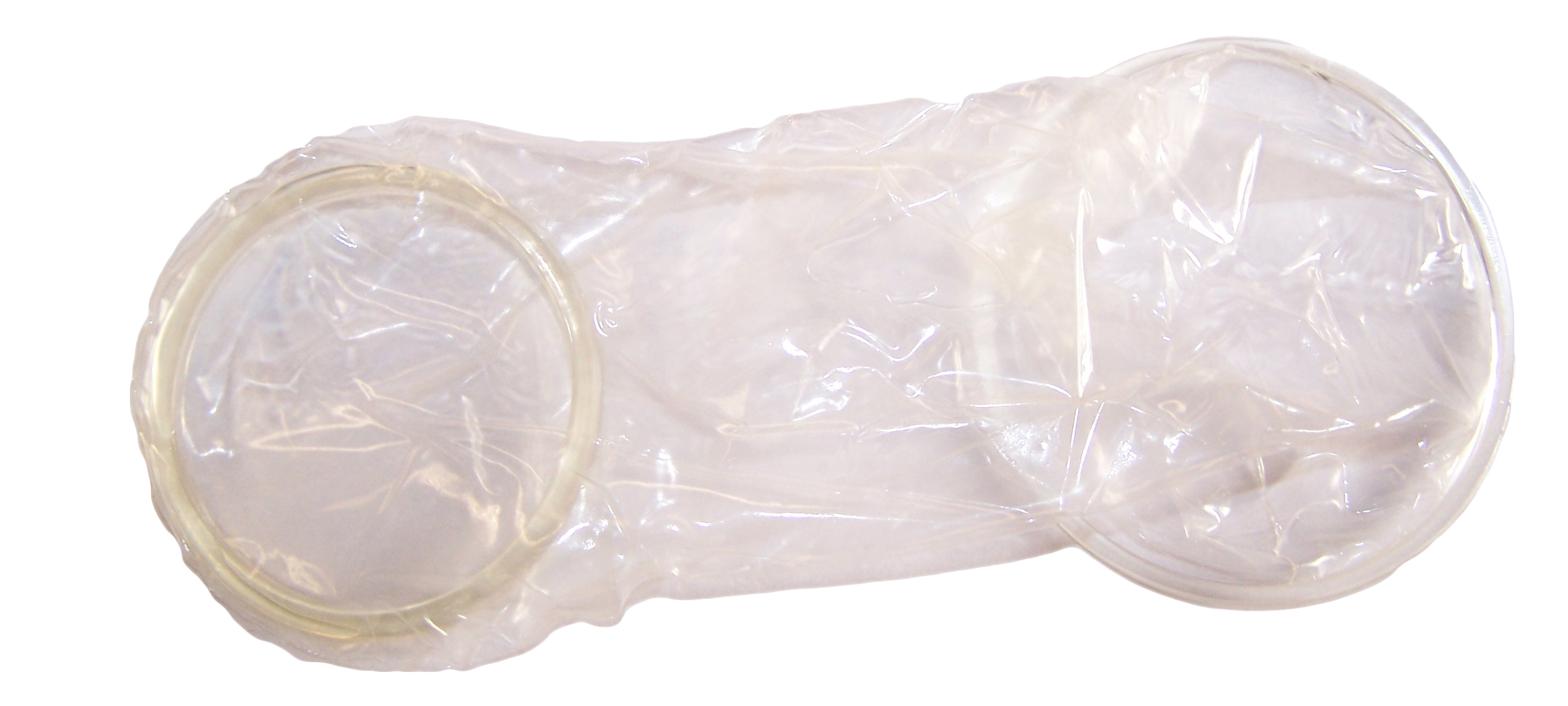
An internal condom

External condoms have a tight ring to form a seal around the penis, while internal condoms usually have a large stiff ring to prevent them from slipping into the body orifice. The Female Health Company produced an internal condom that was initially made of polyurethane, but newer versions are made of nitrile rubber. Medtech Products produces an internal condom made of latex.

=== Materials ===
==== Natural latex ====
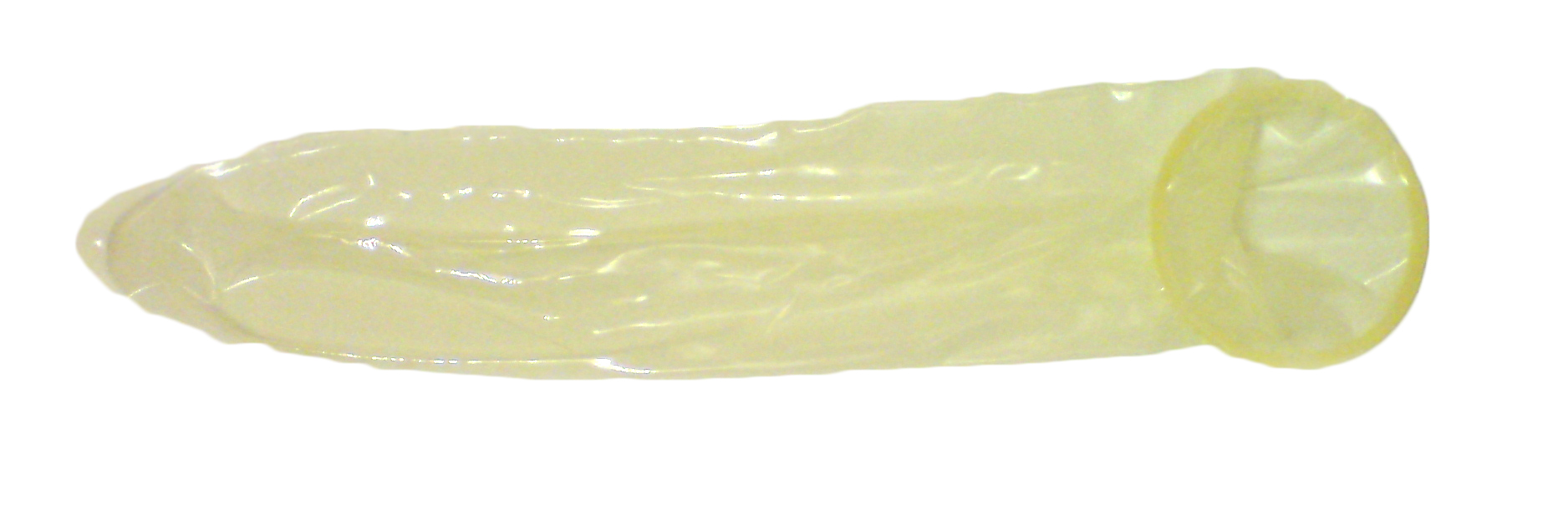
An unrolled latex condom

Latex has outstanding elastic properties: Its tensile strength exceeds 30 MPa, and latex condoms may be stretched in excess of 800% before breaking. In 1990 the ISO set standards for condom production (ISO 4074, Natural latex rubber condoms), and the EU followed suit with its CEN standard (Directive 93/42/EEC concerning medical devices). Every latex condom is tested for holes with an electric current. If the condom passes, it is rolled and packaged. In addition, a portion of each batch of condoms is subject to water leak and air burst testing.

While the advantages of latex have made it the most popular condom material, it does have some drawbacks. Latex condoms are damaged when used with oil-based substances as lubricants, such as petroleum jelly, cooking oil, baby oil, mineral oil, skin lotions, suntan lotions, cold creams, butter or margarine. Contact with oil makes latex condoms more likely to break or slip off due to loss of elasticity caused by the oils. Additionally, latex allergy precludes use of latex condoms and is one of the principal reasons for the use of other materials. In May 2009, the U.S. Food and Drug Administration (FDA) granted approval for the production of condoms composed of Vytex, latex that has been treated to remove 90% of the proteins responsible for allergic reactions. An allergen-free condom made of synthetic latex (polyisoprene) is also available.

==== Synthetic ====
The most common non-latex condoms are made from polyurethane. Condoms may also be made from other synthetic materials, such as AT-10 resin, and most polyisoprene.

Polyurethane condoms tend to be the same width and thickness as latex condoms, with most polyurethane condoms between 0.04 mm and 0.07 mm thick.

Polyurethane can be considered better than latex in several ways: it conducts heat better than latex, is not as sensitive to temperature and ultraviolet light (and so has less rigid storage requirements and a longer shelf life), can be used with oil-based lubricants, is less allergenic than latex, and does not have an odor. Polyurethane condoms have gained FDA approval for sale in the United States as an effective method of contraception and HIV prevention, and under laboratory conditions have been shown to be just as effective as latex for these purposes.

However, polyurethane condoms are less elastic than latex ones, and may be more likely to slip or break than latex, lose their shape or bunch up more than latex, and are more expensive.

Polyisoprene is a synthetic version of natural rubber latex. While significantly more expensive, it has the advantages of latex (such as being softer and more elastic than polyurethane condoms) without the protein which is responsible for latex allergies. Unlike polyurethane condoms, they cannot be used with an oil-based lubricant.

==== Lambskin ====
Condoms made from the intestines of sheep, labeled "lambskin", are also available. Although they are generally effective as a contraceptive by blocking sperm, studies have found that they are less effective than latex in preventing the transmission of sexually transmitted infections because of pores in the material. This is because intestines, by their nature, are porous, permeable membranes, and while sperm are too large to pass through the pores, viruses—such as HIV, herpes, and genital warts—are small enough to pass.

As a result of laboratory data on condom porosity, in 1989, the FDA began requiring lambskin condom manufacturers to indicate that the products were not to be used for the prevention of sexually transmitted infections. The FDA cautions that while lambskin condoms "provide good birth control and a varying degree of protection against some, but not all, sexually transmitted diseases", people do not know what STIs a partner might have, and thus cannot assume that a lambskin condom will protect them.

While lambskin condoms avoid triggering latex allergies, polyurethane condoms do as well, while also protecting more reliably against STIs. As slaughter by-products, lambskin condoms are also not vegetarian. Pharmacist advice prepared by the Canadian Pharmaceutical Journal says that lambskin condoms "are generally not recommended" due to limited STI prevention. An article in Adolescent Medicine advises that they "should be used only for pregnancy prevention".

=== Spermicide ===
Some latex condoms are lubricated at the manufacturer with a small amount of a nonoxynol-9, a spermicidal chemical. According to Consumer Reports, condoms lubricated with spermicide have no additional benefit in preventing pregnancy, have a shorter shelf life, and may cause urinary tract infections in women. In contrast, application of separately packaged spermicide is believed to increase the contraceptive efficacy of condoms.

Nonoxynol-9 was once believed to offer additional protection against STIs (including HIV) but recent studies have shown that, with frequent use, nonoxynol-9 may increase the risk of HIV transmission. The World Health Organization says that spermicidally lubricated condoms should no longer be promoted. However, it recommends using a nonoxynol-9 lubricated condom over no condom at all. As of 2005, nine condom manufacturers have stopped manufacturing condoms with nonoxynol-9 and Planned Parenthood has discontinued the distribution of condoms so lubricated.

=== Ribbed and studded ===
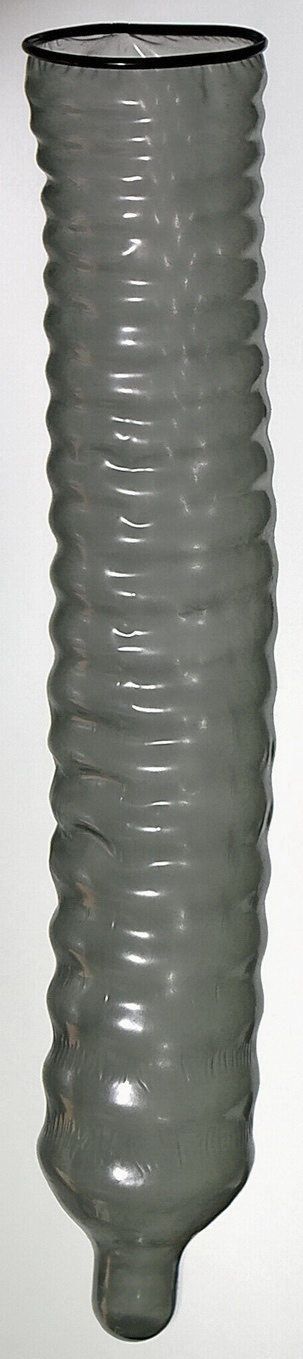
A ribbed condom

Textured condoms include studded and ribbed condoms which can provide extra sensations to both partners. The studs or ribs can be located on the inside, outside, or both; alternatively, they are located in specific sections to provide directed stimulation to either the G-spot or frenulum. Many textured condoms which advertise "mutual pleasure" also are bulb-shaped at the top, to provide extra stimulation to the penis. Some women experience irritation during vaginal intercourse with studded condoms.

=== Flavored ===
Flavored condoms are specialized condom products that have a flavor-coating and that are specially designed for an oral intercourse exclusively, and not for penetrative acts. Originally flavored condoms used to be more of a novelty item, rather than for actual protection. However, now there are FDA approved flavored condoms on the market. Some flavored condoms also have a flavor-specific scent added to them.

Some concerns of using flavored condoms in vaginal penetration exist, since flavored condoms have some amounts of sugar on them, and inserting sugar to vagina can end up resulting in candidal vulvovaginitis or bacterial vaginosis. People with latex allergy should avoid using flavored latex-material condoms, and instead use polyurethane or polyisoprene condoms.

=== Other ===
The anti-rape condom is another variation designed to be worn by women. It is designed to cause pain to the attacker, hopefully allowing the victim a chance to escape.

A collection condom is used to collect semen for fertility treatments or sperm analysis. These condoms are designed to maximize sperm life.

In February 2022, the U.S. Food and Drug Administration (FDA) approved the first condoms specifically indicated to help reduce transmission of sexually transmitted infections (STIs) during anal intercourse.

== Prevalence ==
Annual condoms distributed and sold per 1000 people

The prevalence of condom use varies greatly between countries. Most surveys of contraceptive use are among married women, or women in informal unions. Japan has the highest rate of condom usage in the world: in that country, condoms account for almost 80% of contraceptive use by married women. On average, in developed countries, condoms are the most popular method of birth control: 28% of married contraceptive users rely on condoms. In the average less-developed country, condoms are less common: only 6–8% of married contraceptive users choose condoms.

== History ==
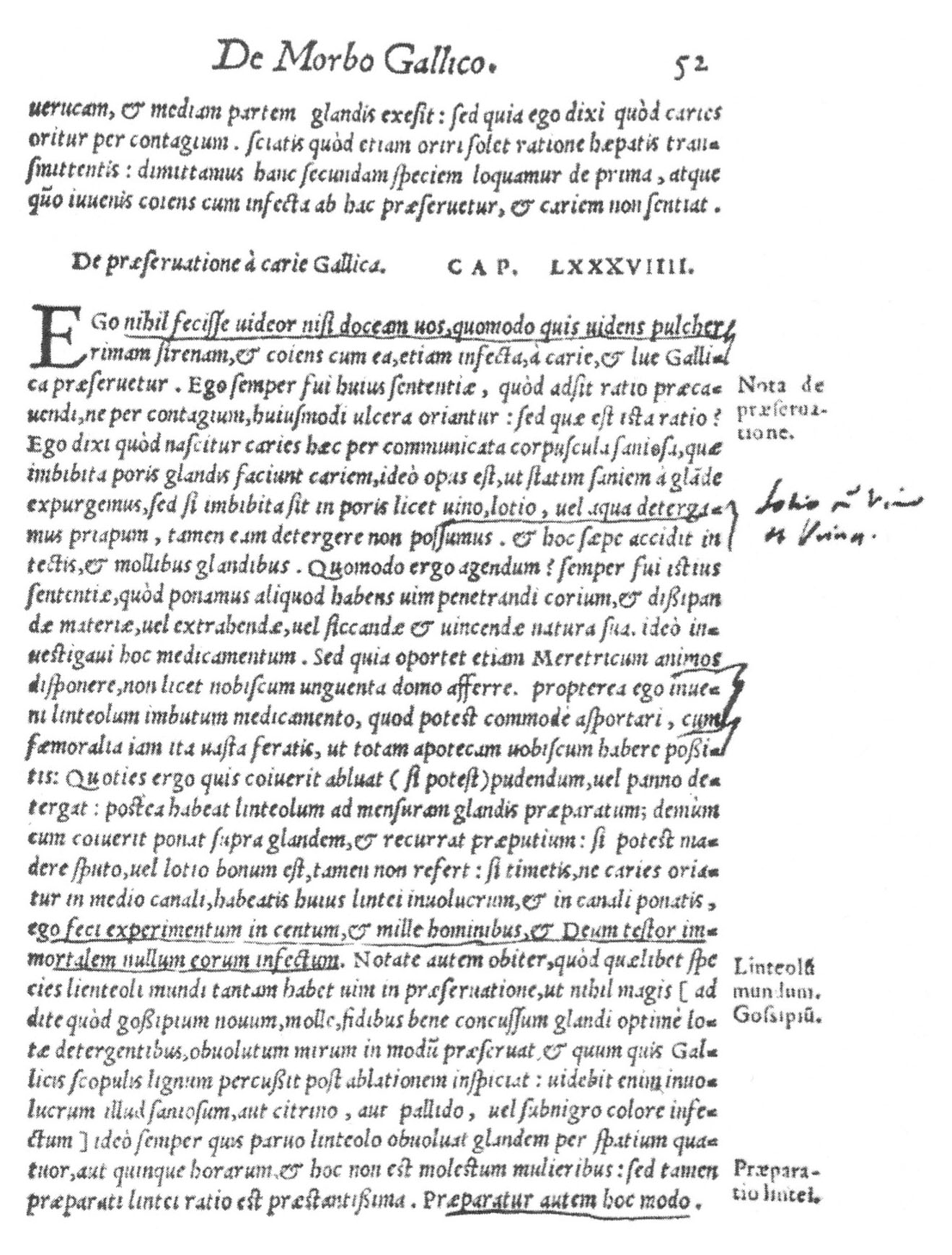
A page from De Morbo Gallico ('On the French Disease'), Gabriele Falloppio's treatise on syphilis. Published in 1564, it describes what is possibly the first use of condoms.

=== Before the 19th century ===
Whether condoms were used in ancient civilizations is debated by archaeologists and historians. In ancient Egypt, Greece, and Rome, pregnancy prevention was generally seen as a woman's responsibility, and the only well documented contraception methods were female-controlled devices. In Asia before the 15th century, some use of glans condoms (devices covering only the head of the penis) is recorded. Condoms seem to have been used for contraception, and to have been known only by members of the upper classes. In China, glans condoms may have been made of oiled silk paper, or of lamb intestines. In Japan, condoms called Kabuto-gata (甲形) were made of tortoise shell or animal horn.

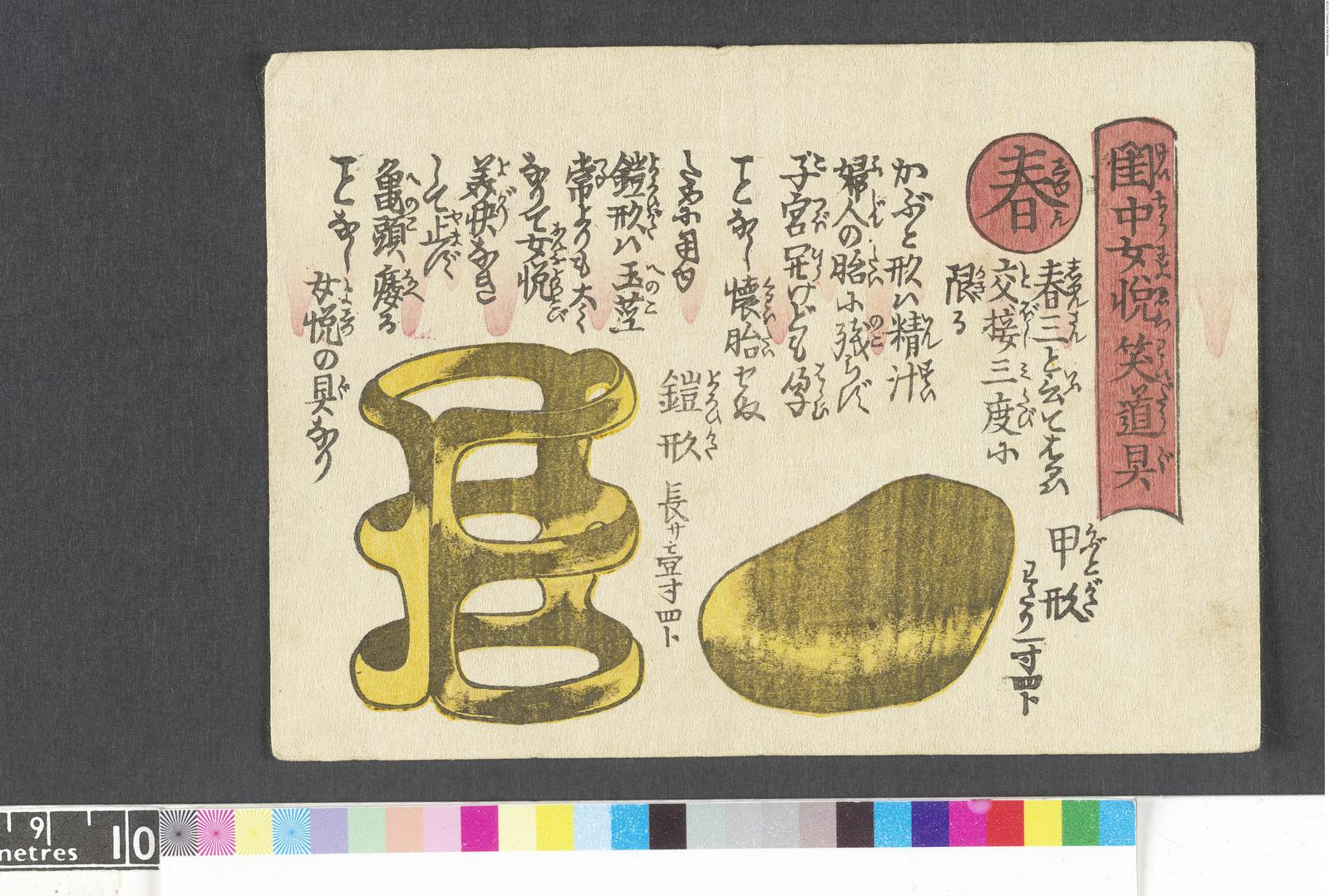
Japanese Shunga Ukiyoe from the 19th century depicting Kabuto-gata among its sex toys used among women, stored by the British Museum

In 16th-century Italy, anatomist and physician Gabriele Falloppio wrote a treatise on syphilis. The earliest documented strain of syphilis, first appearing in Europe in a 1490s outbreak, caused severe symptoms and often death within a few months of contracting the disease. Falloppio's treatise is the earliest uncontested description of condom use: it describes linen sheaths soaked in a chemical solution and allowed to dry before use. The cloths he described were sized to cover the glans of the penis, and were held on with a ribbon. Falloppio claimed that an experimental trial of the linen sheath demonstrated protection against syphilis.

After this, the use of penis coverings to protect from disease is described in a wide variety of literature throughout Europe. The first indication that these devices were used for birth control, rather than disease prevention, is the 1605 theological publication De iustitia et iure (On justice and law) by Catholic theologian Leonardus Lessius, who condemned them as immoral. In 1666, the English Birth Rate Commission attributed a recent downward fertility rate to use of "condons", the first documented use of that word or any similar spelling. Other early spellings include "condam" and "quondam", from which the Italian derivation guantone has been suggested, from guanto, "a glove".

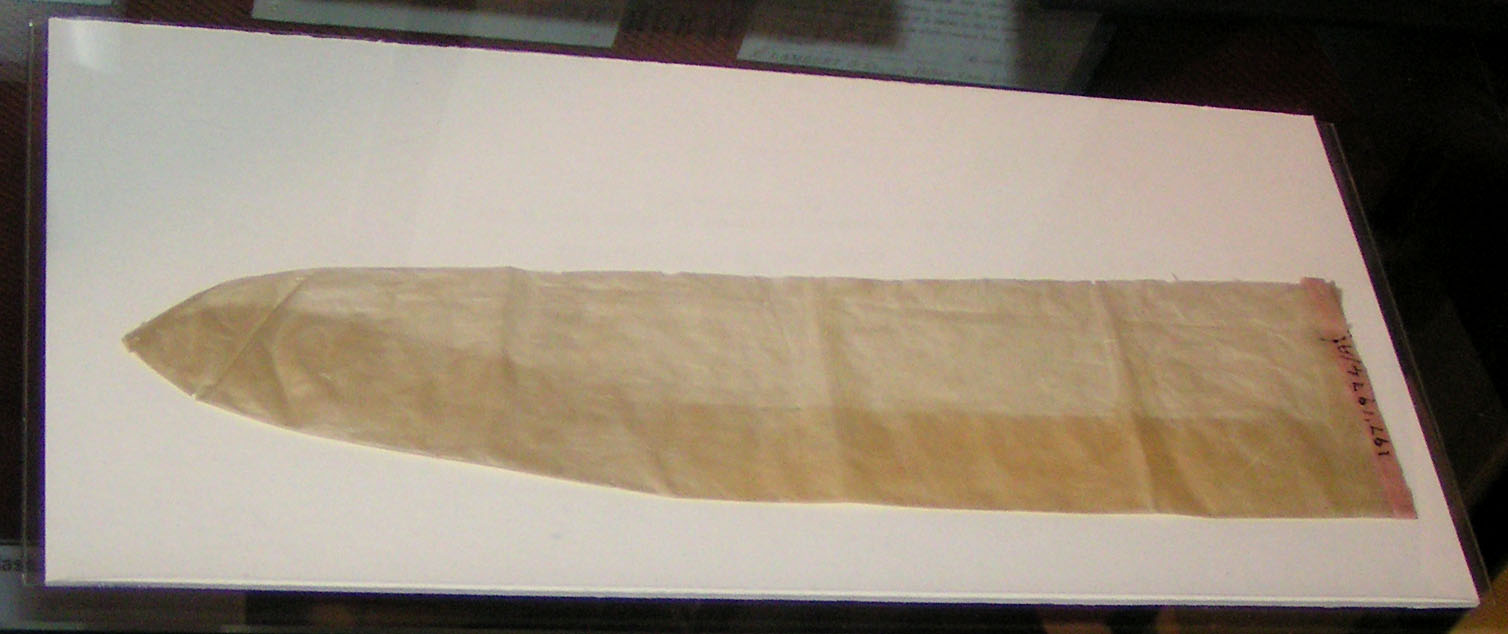
A condom made from animal intestine circa 1900

In addition to linen, condoms during the Renaissance were made out of intestines and bladder. In the late 16th century, Dutch traders introduced condoms made from "fine leather" to Japan. Unlike the horn condoms used previously, these leather condoms covered the entire penis.

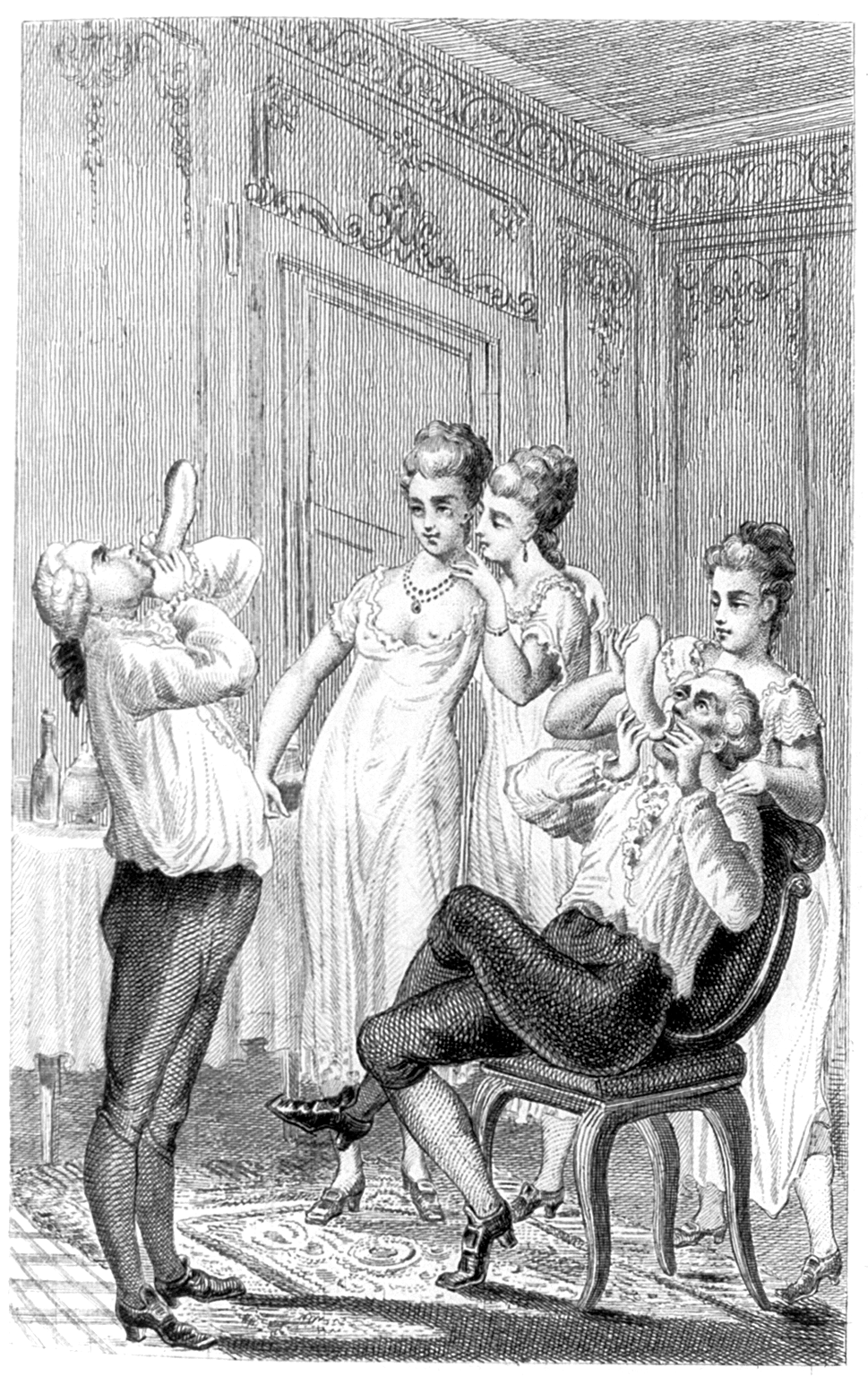
Giacomo Casanova tests his condom for holes by inflating it

Casanova in the 18th century was one of the first reported using "assurance caps" to prevent impregnating his mistresses.

From at least the 18th century, condom use was opposed in some legal, religious, and medical circles for essentially the same reasons that are given today: condoms reduce the likelihood of pregnancy, which some thought immoral or undesirable for the nation; they do not provide full protection against sexually transmitted infections, while belief in their protective powers was thought to encourage sexual promiscuity; and, they are not used consistently due to inconvenience, expense, or loss of sensation.

Despite some opposition, the condom market grew rapidly. In the 18th century, condoms were available in a variety of qualities and sizes, made from either linen treated with chemicals, or "skin" (bladder or intestine softened by treatment with sulfur and lye). They were sold at pubs, barbershops, chemist shops, open-air markets, and at the theater throughout Europe and Russia. They later spread to America, although in every place there were generally used only by the middle and upper classes, due to both expense and lack of sex education.

=== 1800 through 1920s ===
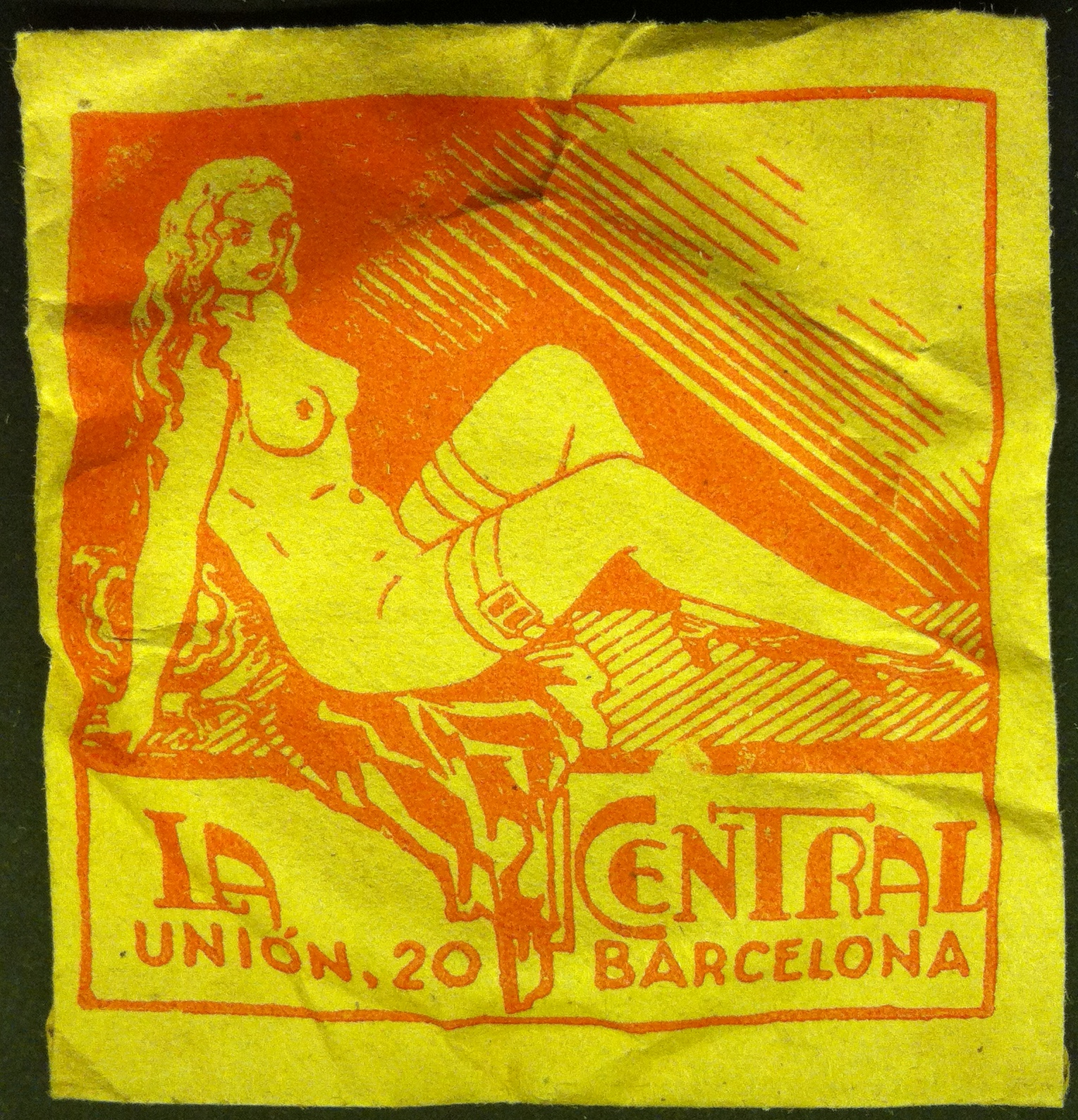
An old-fashioned condom package

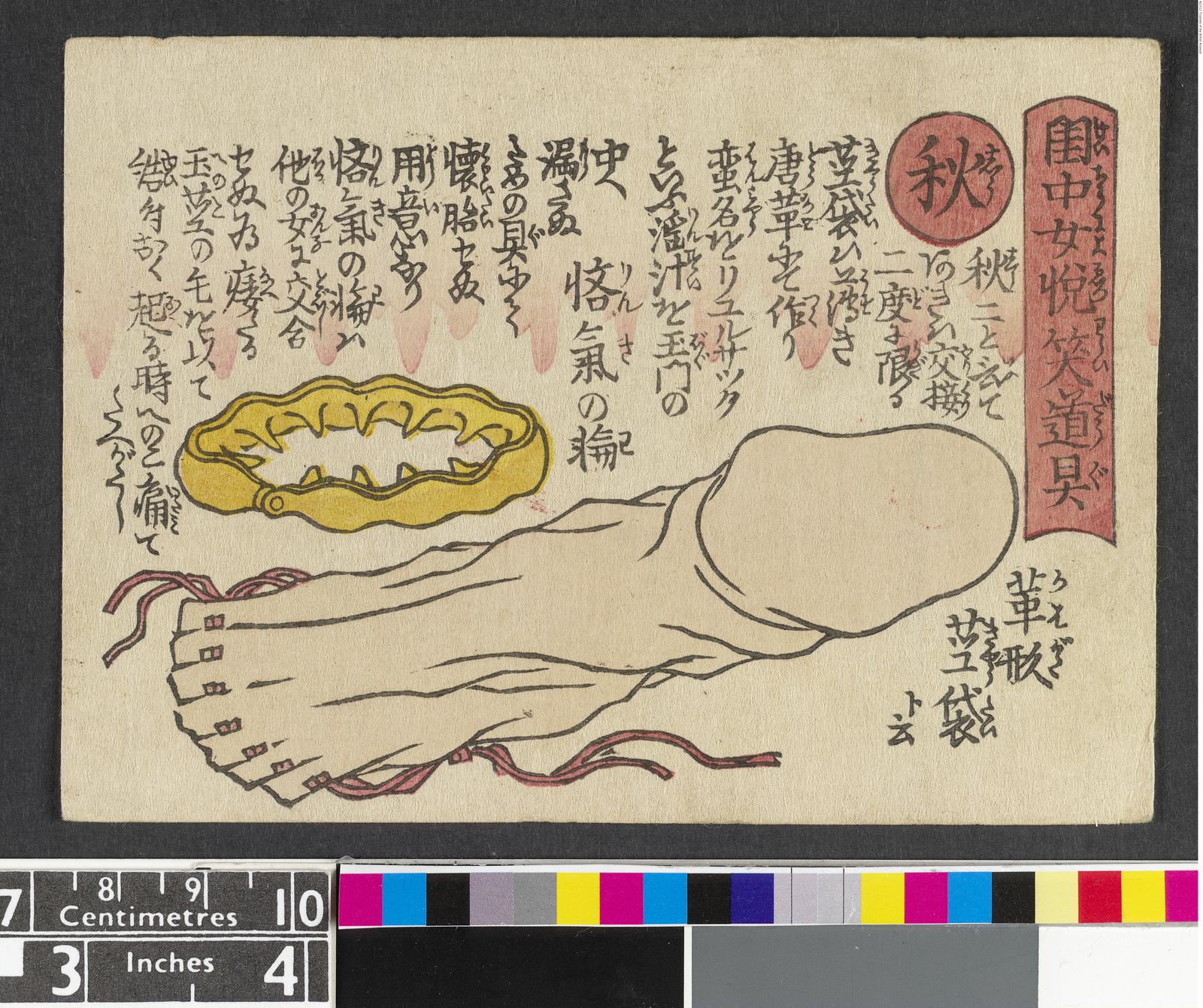
Shū-kawagata kyōtai (Autumn – Leather Phallus Bag), third from a set of four kōban-format colour woodblock prints depicting sex toys of the four seasons, c. 1822 (Bunsei era), Japan.

The early 19th century saw contraceptives promoted to the poorer classes for the first time. Writers on contraception tended to prefer other birth control methods to the condom. By the late 19th century, many feminists expressed distrust of the condom as a contraceptive, as its use was controlled and decided upon by men alone. They advocated instead for methods controlled by women, such as diaphragms and spermicidal douches. Other writers cited both the expense of condoms and their unreliability (they were often riddled with holes and often fell off or tore). Still, they discussed condoms as a good option for some and the only contraceptive that protects from disease.

Many countries passed laws impeding the manufacture and promotion of contraceptives. In spite of these restrictions, condoms were promoted by traveling lecturers and in newspaper advertisements, using euphemisms in places where such ads were illegal. Instructions on how to make condoms at home were distributed in the United States and Europe. Despite social and legal opposition, at the end of the 19th century the condom was the Western world's most popular birth control method.

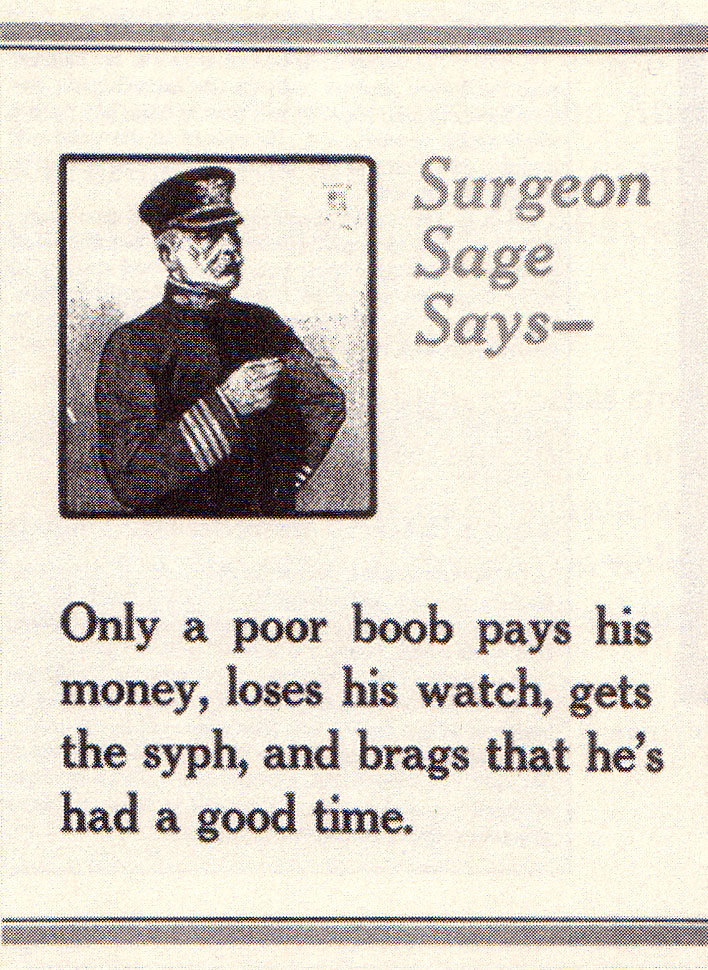
During World War I, the U.S. military was the only one that did not promote condom use. Posters such as these were intended to promote abstinence.

Beginning in the second half of the 19th century, American rates of sexually transmitted infections skyrocketed. Causes cited by historians include the effects of the American Civil War and the ignorance of prevention methods promoted by the Comstock laws. To fight the growing epidemic, sex education classes were introduced to public schools for the first time, teaching about venereal diseases and how they were transmitted. They generally taught abstinence was the only way to avoid sexually transmitted infections. Condoms were not promoted for disease prevention because the medical community and moral watchdogs considered STIs to be punishment for sexual misbehavior. The stigma against people with these diseases was so significant that many hospitals refused to treat people with syphilis.

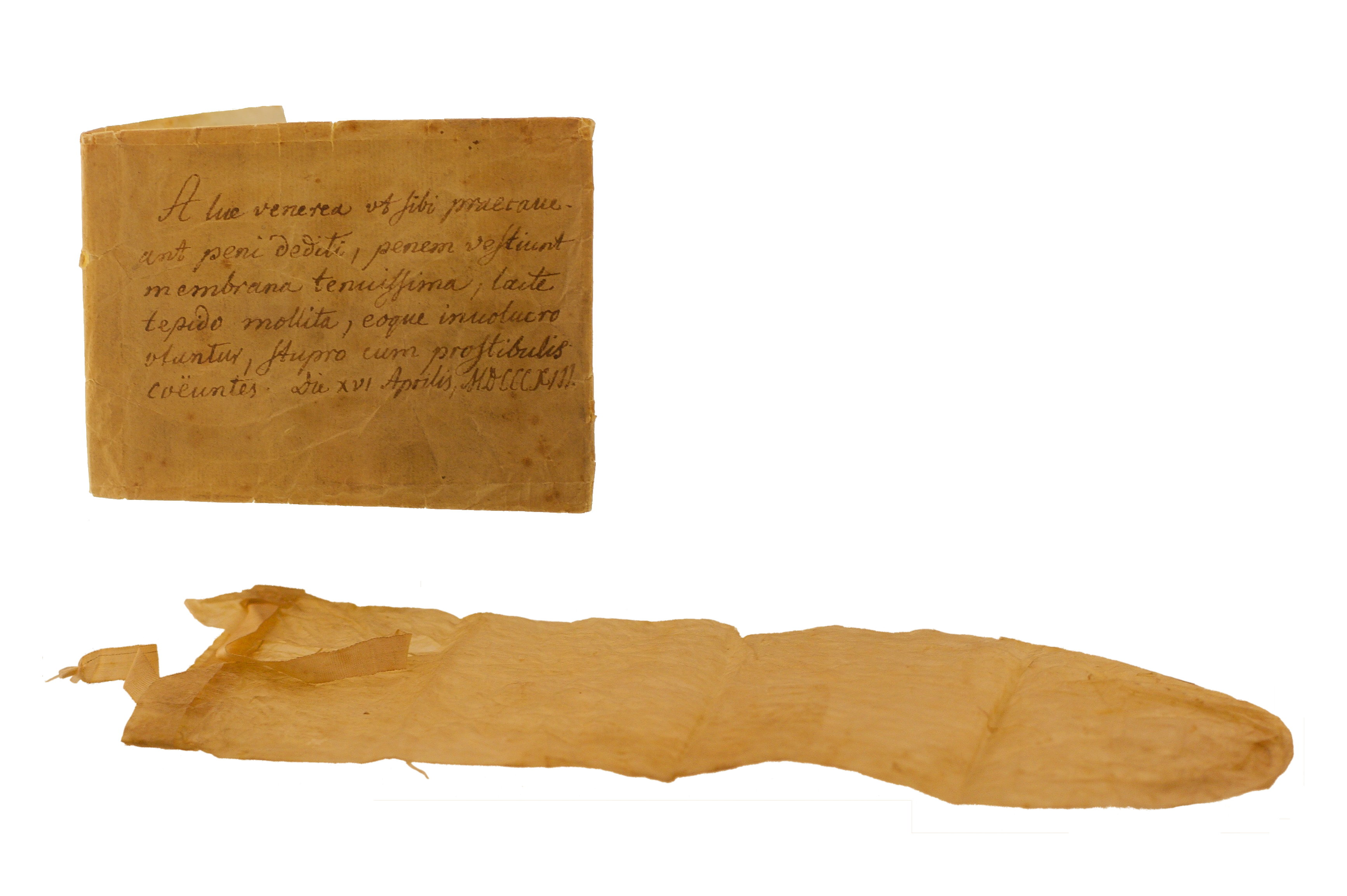
Condom (and manual) from 1813

The German military was the first to promote condom use among its soldiers in the later 19th century. Early 20th century experiments by the American military concluded that providing condoms to soldiers significantly lowered rates of sexually transmitted infections. During World War I, the United States and (at the beginning of the war only) Britain were the only countries with soldiers in Europe who did not provide condoms and promote their use.

In the decades after World War I, there remained social and legal obstacles to condom use throughout the U.S. and Europe. Founder of psychoanalysis Sigmund Freud opposed all methods of birth control because their failure rates were too high. Freud was especially opposed to the condom because he thought it cut down on sexual pleasure. Some feminists continued to oppose male-controlled contraceptives such as condoms. In 1920 the Church of England's Lambeth Conference condemned all "unnatural means of conception avoidance". The Bishop of London, Arthur Winnington-Ingram, complained of the huge number of condoms discarded in alleyways and parks, especially after weekends and holidays.

However, European militaries continued to provide condoms to their members for disease protection, even in countries where they were illegal for the general population. Through the 1920s, catchy names and slick packaging became an increasingly important marketing technique for many consumer items, including condoms and cigarettes. Quality testing became more common, involving filling each condom with air followed by one of several methods intended to detect loss of pressure. Worldwide, condom sales doubled in the 1920s.

=== Rubber and manufacturing advances ===
In 1839, Charles Goodyear discovered a way of processing natural rubber, which is too stiff when cold and too soft when warm, in such a way as to make it elastic. This proved to have advantages for the manufacture of condoms; unlike the sheep's gut condoms, they could stretch and did not tear quickly when used. The rubber vulcanization process was patented by Goodyear in 1844. The first rubber condom was produced in 1855. The earliest rubber condoms had a seam and were as thick as a bicycle inner tube. Besides this type, small rubber condoms covering only the glans were often used in England and the United States. There was more risk of losing them and if the rubber ring was too tight, it would constrict the penis. This type of condom was the original "capote" (French for condom), perhaps because of its resemblance to a woman's bonnet worn at that time, also called a capote.

For many decades, rubber condoms were manufactured by wrapping strips of raw rubber around penis-shaped molds, then dipping the wrapped molds in a chemical solution to cure the rubber. In 1912, Polish-born inventor Julius Fromm developed a new, improved manufacturing technique for condoms: dipping glass molds into a raw rubber solution. Called cement dipping, this method required adding gasoline or benzene to the rubber to make it liquid. Around 1920 patent lawyer and vice-president of the United States Rubber Company Ernest Hopkinson invented a new technique of converting latex into rubber without a coagulant (demulsifier), which featured using water as a solvent and warm air to dry the solution, as well as optionally preserving liquid latex with ammonia. Condoms made this way, commonly called "latex" ones, required less labor to produce than cement-dipped rubber condoms, which had to be smoothed by rubbing and trimming. The use of water to suspend the rubber instead of gasoline and benzene eliminated the fire hazard previously associated with all condom factories. Latex condoms also performed better for the consumer: they were stronger and thinner than rubber condoms, and had a shelf life of five years (compared to three months for rubber).

Until the twenties, all condoms were individually hand-dipped by semi-skilled workers. Throughout the decade of the 1920s, advances in the automation of the condom assembly line were made. The first fully automated line was patented in 1930. Major condom manufacturers bought or leased conveyor systems, and small manufacturers were driven out of business. The skin condom, now significantly more expensive than the latex variety, became restricted to a niche high-end market.

=== 1930 to present ===
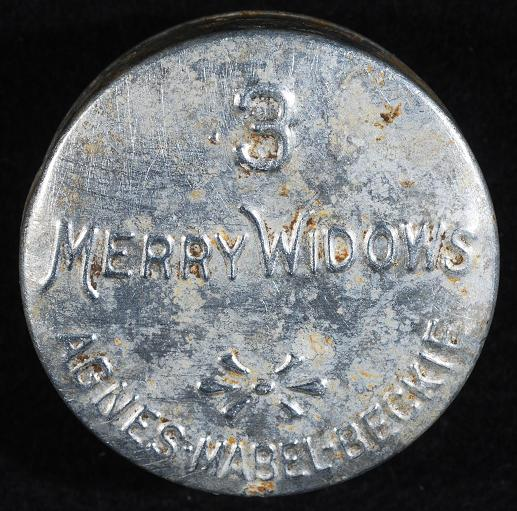
Condom tin, "3 Merry Widows" brand, circa 1930.

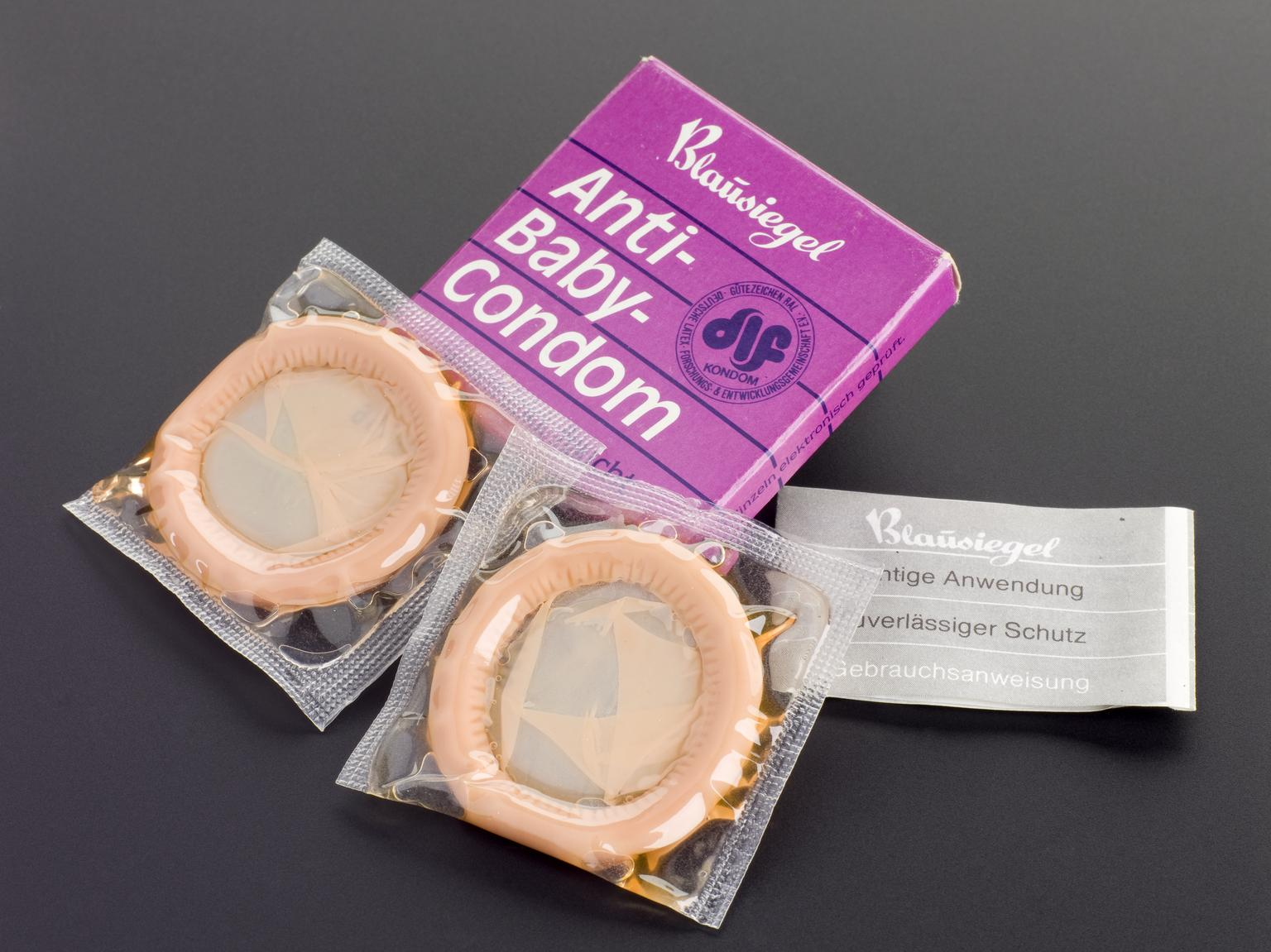
A packet of "Anti-baby" condoms from Germany. c1980s.

In 1930 the Anglican Church's Lambeth Conference sanctioned the use of birth control by married couples. In 1931 the Federal Council of Churches in the U.S. issued a similar statement. The Roman Catholic Church responded by issuing the encyclical Casti connubii affirming its opposition to all contraceptives, a stance it has never reversed. In the 1930s, legal restrictions on condoms began to be relaxed. However, during this period Fascist Italy and Nazi Germany increased restrictions on condoms (limited sales as disease preventatives were still allowed). During the Depression, condom lines by Schmid gained in popularity. Schmid still used the cement-dipping method of manufacture which had two advantages over the latex variety. Firstly, cement-dipped condoms could be safely used with oil-based lubricants. Secondly, while less comfortable, these older-style rubber condoms could be reused and so were more economical, a valued feature in hard times. More attention was brought to quality issues in the 1930s, and the U.S. Food and Drug Administration began to regulate the quality of condoms sold in the United States.

Throughout World War II, condoms were not only distributed to male U.S. military members, but also heavily promoted with films, posters, and lectures. European and Asian militaries on both sides of the conflict also provided condoms to their troops throughout the war, even Germany which outlawed all civilian use of condoms in 1941. In part because condoms were readily available, soldiers found a number of non-sexual uses for the devices, many of which continue to this day. After the war, condom sales continued to grow. From 1955 to 1965, 42% of Americans of reproductive age relied on condoms for birth control. In Britain from 1950 to 1960, 60% of married couples used condoms. The birth control pill became the world's most popular method of birth control in the years after its 1960 début, but condoms remained a strong second. The U.S. Agency for International Development pushed condom use in developing countries to help solve the "world population crises": by 1970 hundreds of millions of condoms were being used each year in India alone.(This number has grown in recent decades: in 2004, the government of India purchased 1.9 billion condoms for distribution at family planning clinics.)

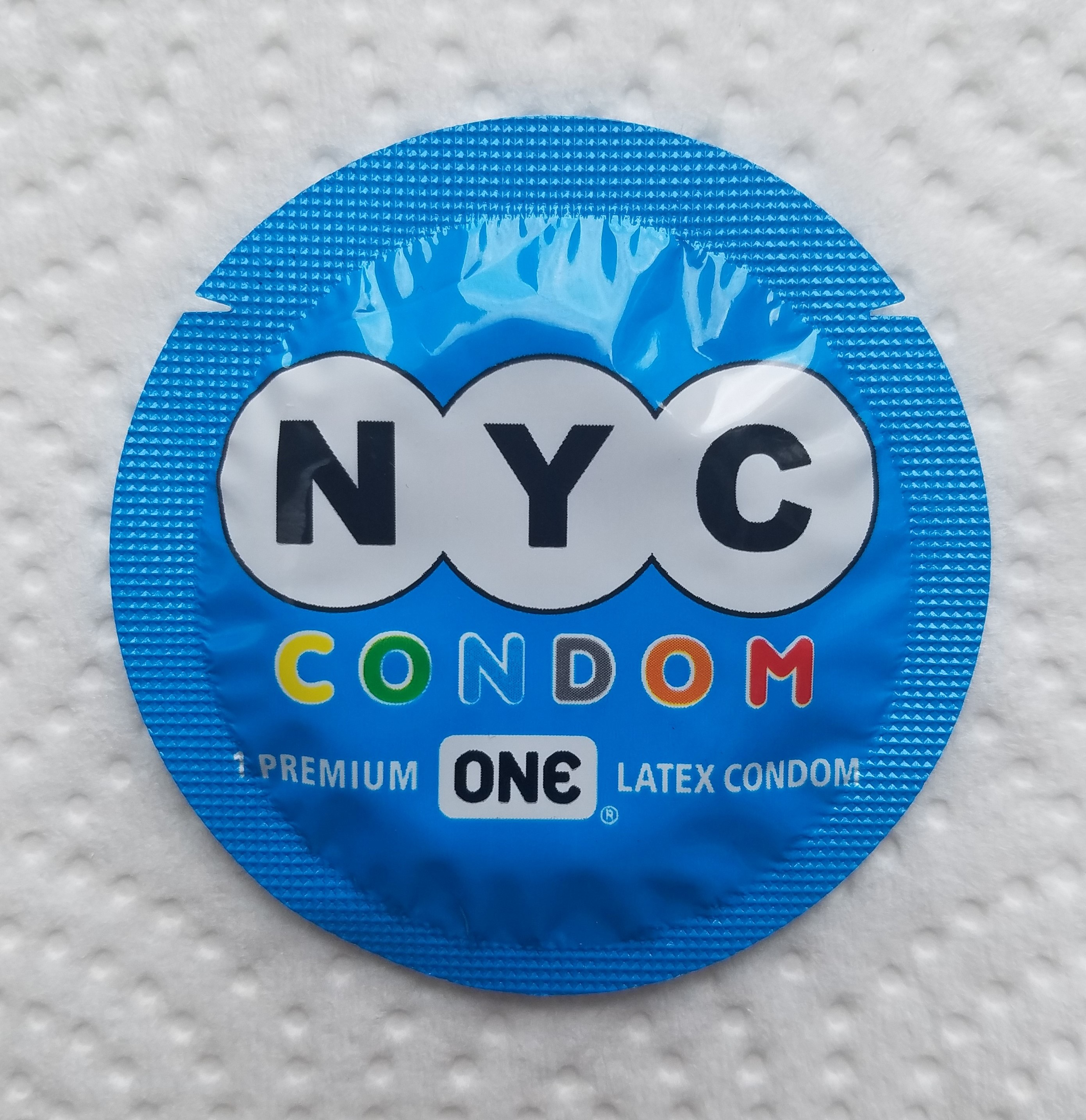
A condom given out by NYC Health Department during the Stonewall 50 – WorldPride NYC 2019 celebrations.

In the 1960s and 1970s quality regulations tightened, and more legal barriers to condom use were removed. In Ireland, legal condom sales were allowed for the first time in 1978. Advertising, however was one area that continued to have legal restrictions. In the late 1950s, the American National Association of Broadcasters banned condom advertisements from national television; this policy remained in place until 1979.

After it was discovered in the early 1980s that AIDS can be a sexually transmitted infection, the use of condoms was encouraged to prevent transmission of HIV. Despite opposition by some political, religious, and other figures, national condom promotion campaigns occurred in the U.S. and Europe. These campaigns increased condom use significantly.

Due to increased demand and greater social acceptance, condoms began to be sold in a wider variety of retail outlets, including in supermarkets and in discount department stores such as Walmart. Condom sales increased every year until 1994, when media attention to the AIDS pandemic began to decline. The phenomenon of decreasing use of condoms as disease preventatives has been called prevention fatigue or condom fatigue. Observers have cited condom fatigue in both Europe and North America. As one response, manufacturers have changed the tone of their advertisements from scary to humorous.

New developments continued to occur in the condom market, with the first polyurethane condom—branded Avanti and produced by the manufacturer of Durex—introduced in the 1990s. Worldwide condom use is expected to continue to grow: one study predicted that developing nations would need 18.6 billion condoms by 2015. As of September 2013, condoms are available inside prisons in Canada, most of the European Union, Australia, Brazil, Indonesia, South Africa, and the US states of Vermont (on 17 September 2013, the Californian Senate approved a bill for condom distribution inside the state's prisons, but the bill was not yet law at the time of approval).

The global condom market was estimated at US$9.2 billion in 2020.

=== Etymology and other terms ===
The term condom first appears in the early 18th century: early forms include condum (1706 and 1717), condon (1708) and cundum (1744). The word's etymology is unknown. In popular tradition, the invention and naming of the condom came to be attributed to an associate of England's King Charles II, one "Dr. Condom" or "Earl of Condom". There is however no evidence of the existence of such a person, and condoms had been used for over one hundred years before King Charles II acceded to the throne in 1660.

A variety of unproven Latin etymologies have been proposed, including condon (receptacle), condamina (house), and cumdum (scabbard or case). It has also been speculated to be from the Italian word guantone, derived from guanto, meaning glove. William E. Kruck wrote an article in 1981 concluding that, "As for the word 'condom', I need state only that its origin remains completely unknown, and there ends this search for an etymology." Modern dictionaries may also list the etymology as "unknown".

Other terms are also commonly used to describe condoms. In North America condoms are also commonly known as prophylactics, or rubbers. In Britain they may be called French letters or rubber johnnies. Additionally, condoms may be referred to using the manufacturer's name.

== Society and culture ==
Some moral and scientific criticism of condoms exists despite the many benefits of condoms agreed on by scientific consensus and sexual health experts.

Condom usage is typically recommended for new couples who have yet to develop full trust in their partner with regard to STIs. Established couples on the other hand have few concerns about STIs, and can use other methods of birth control such as the pill, which does not act as a barrier to intimate sexual contact. Note that the polar debate with regard to condom usage is attenuated by the target group the argument is directed. Notably the age category and stable partner question are factors, as well as the distinction between heterosexual and homosexuals, who have different kinds of sex and have different risk consequences and factors.

Among the prime objections to condom usage is the blocking of erotic sensation, or the intimacy that barrier-free sex provides. As the condom is held tightly to the skin of the penis, it diminishes the delivery of stimulation through rubbing and friction. Condom proponents claim this has the benefit of making sex last longer, by diminishing sensation and delaying male ejaculation. Those who promote condom-free heterosexual sex (slang: "bareback") claim that the condom puts a barrier between partners, diminishing what is normally a highly sensual, intimate, and spiritual connection between partners.

=== Religious ===
The United Church of Christ (UCC), a Reformed denomination of the Congregationalist tradition, promotes the distribution of condoms in churches and faith-based educational settings. Michael Shuenemeyer, a UCC minister, has stated that "The practice of safer sex is a matter of life and death. People of faith make condoms available because we have chosen life so that we and our children may live."

On the other hand, the Roman Catholic Church opposes all kinds of sexual acts outside of marriage, as well as any sexual act in which the chance of successful conception has been reduced by direct and intentional acts (for example, surgery to prevent conception) or foreign objects (for example, condoms).

The use of condoms to prevent STI transmission is not specifically addressed by Catholic doctrine, and is currently a topic of debate among theologians and high-ranking Catholic authorities. A few, such as Belgian Cardinal Godfried Danneels, believe the Catholic Church should actively support condoms used to prevent disease, especially serious diseases such as AIDS. However, the majority view—including all statements from the Vatican—is that condom-promotion programs encourage promiscuity, thereby actually increasing STI transmission. This view was most recently reiterated in 2009 by Pope Benedict XVI.

The Roman Catholic Church is the largest organized body of any world religion. The church has hundreds of programs dedicated to fighting the AIDS epidemic in Africa, but its opposition to condom use in these programs has been highly controversial.

In a November 2011 interview, Pope Benedict XVI discussed for the first time the use of condoms to prevent STI transmission. He said that the use of a condom can be justified in a few individual cases if the purpose is to reduce the risk of an HIV infection. He gave as an example male prostitutes. There was some confusion at first whether the statement applied only to homosexual prostitutes and thus not to heterosexual intercourse at all. However, Federico Lombardi, spokesman for the Vatican, clarified that it applied to heterosexual and transsexual prostitutes, whether male or female, as well. He did, however, also clarify that the Vatican's principles on sexuality and contraception had not been changed.

=== Scientific and environmental ===
More generally, some scientific researchers have expressed objective concern over certain ingredients sometimes added to condoms, notably talc and nitrosamines. Dry dusting powders are applied to latex condoms before packaging to prevent the condom from sticking to itself when rolled up. Previously, talc was used by most manufacturers, but cornstarch is currently the most popular dusting powder. Although rare during normal use, talc is known to be potentially irritant to mucous membranes (such as in the vagina). Cornstarch is generally believed to be safe; however, some researchers have raised concerns over its use as well.

Nitrosamines, which are potentially carcinogenic in humans, are believed to be present in a substance used to improve elasticity in latex condoms. A 2001 review stated that humans regularly receive 1,000 to 10,000 times greater nitrosamine exposure from food and tobacco than from condom use and concluded that the risk of cancer from condom use is very low. However, a 2004 study in Germany detected nitrosamines in 29 out of 32 condom brands tested, and concluded that exposure from condoms might exceed the exposure from food by 1.5- to 3-fold.

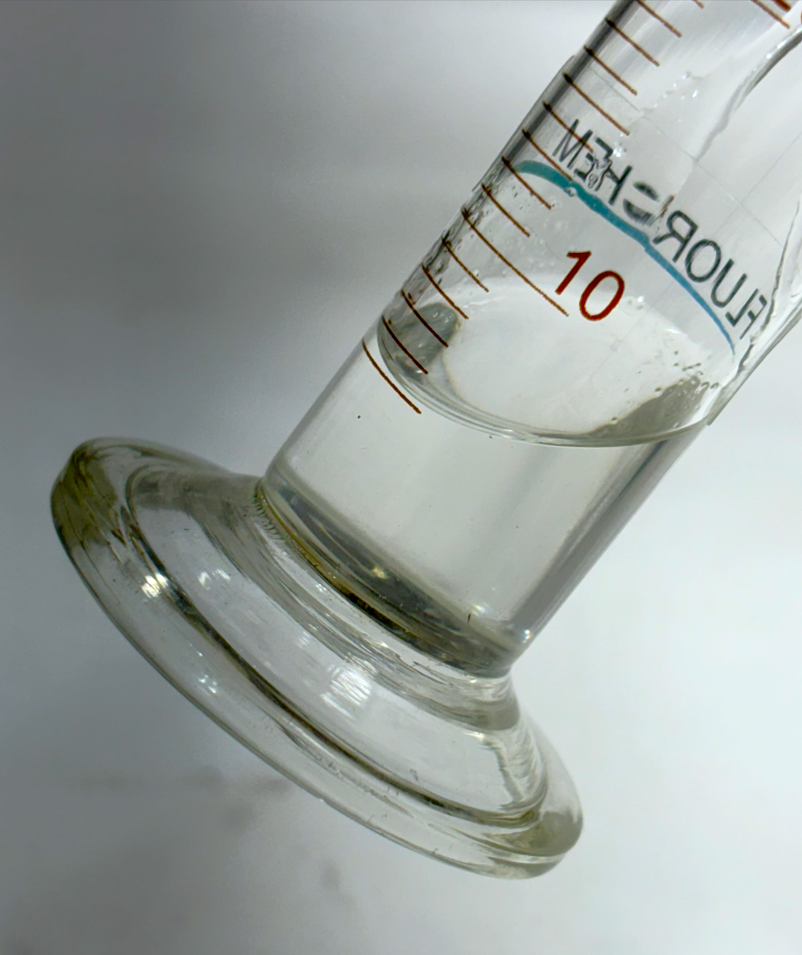
Dimethicone liquid, commonly used as a lubricant in condoms, has been identified in environmental assessments of rinse-off cosmetic ingredients as a potential concern for aquatic ecosystems when disposed via drains.

In addition, the large-scale use of disposable condoms has resulted in concerns over their environmental impact via littering and in landfills, where they can eventually wind up in wildlife environments if not incinerated or otherwise permanently disposed of first. Polyurethane condoms in particular, given they are a form of plastic, are not biodegradable, and latex condoms take a very long time to break down. Experts, such as AVERT, recommend condoms be disposed of in a garbage receptacle, as flushing them down the toilet (which some people do) may cause plumbing blockages and other problems. Furthermore, the plastic and foil wrappers condoms are packaged in are also not biodegradable. However, the benefits condoms offer are widely considered to offset their small landfill mass. Frequent condom or wrapper disposal in public areas such as a parks have been seen as a persistent litter problem.

While biodegradable, latex condoms damage the environment when disposed of improperly. According to the Ocean Conservancy, condoms, along with certain other types of trash, cover the coral reefs and smother sea grass and other bottom dwellers. The United States Environmental Protection Agency also has expressed concerns that many animals might mistake the litter for food.

=== Cultural barriers to use ===
In much of the Western world, the introduction of the pill in the 1960s was associated with a decline in condom use. In Japan, oral contraceptives were not approved for use until September 1999, and even then access was more restricted than in other industrialized nations. Perhaps because of this restricted access to hormonal contraception, Japan has the highest rate of condom usage in the world: in 2008, 80% of contraceptive users relied on condoms.

Cultural attitudes toward gender roles, contraception, and sexual activity vary greatly around the world, and range from extremely conservative to extremely liberal. But in places where condoms are misunderstood, mischaracterised, demonised, or looked upon with overall cultural disapproval, the prevalence of condom use is directly affected. In less-developed countries and among less-educated populations, misperceptions about how disease transmission and conception work negatively affect the use of condoms; additionally, in cultures with more traditional gender roles, women may feel uncomfortable demanding that their partners use condoms.

As an example, Latino immigrants in the United States often face cultural barriers to condom use. A study on female HIV prevention published in the Journal of Sex Health Research asserts that Latino women often lack the attitudes needed to negotiate safe sex due to traditional gender-role norms in the Latino community, and may be afraid to bring up the subject of condom use with their partners. Women who participated in the study often reported that because of the general machismo subtly encouraged in Latino culture, their male partners would be angry or possibly violent at the woman's suggestion that they use condoms. A similar phenomenon has been noted in a survey of low-income American black women; the women in this study also reported a fear of violence at the suggestion to their male partners that condoms be used.

A telephone survey conducted by Rand Corporation and Oregon State University, and published in the Journal of Acquired Immune Deficiency Syndromes showed that belief in AIDS conspiracy theories among United States black men is linked to rates of condom use. As conspiracy beliefs about AIDS grow in a given sector of these black men, consistent condom use drops in that same sector. Female use of condoms was not similarly affected.

In the African continent, condom promotion in some areas has been impeded by anti-condom campaigns by some Muslim and Catholic clerics. Among the Maasai in Tanzania, condom use is hampered by an aversion to "wasting" sperm, which is given sociocultural importance beyond reproduction. Sperm is believed to be an "elixir" to women and to have beneficial health effects. Maasai women believe that, after conceiving a child, they must have sexual intercourse repeatedly so that the additional sperm aids the child's development. Frequent condom use is also considered by some Maasai to cause impotence. Some women in Africa believe that condoms are "for prostitutes" and that respectable women should not use them. A few clerics even promote the lie that condoms are deliberately laced with HIV. In the United States, possession of many condoms has been used by police to accuse women of engaging in prostitution. The Presidential Advisory Council on HIV/AIDS has condemned this practice and there are efforts to end it.

Middle-Eastern couples who have not had children, because of the strong desire and social pressure to establish fertility as soon as possible within marriage, rarely use condoms.

In 2017, India restricted TV advertisements for condoms to between the hours of 10 pm to 6 am. Family planning advocates were against this, saying it was liable to "undo decades of progress on sexual and reproductive health".

=== Major manufacturers ===
One analyst described the size of the condom market as something that "boggles the mind". Numerous small manufacturers, nonprofit groups, and government-run manufacturing plants exist around the world. Within the condom market, there are several major contributors, among them both for-profit businesses and philanthropic organizations. Most large manufacturers have ties to the business that reach back to the end of the 19th century.

== Research ==
A spray-on condom made of latex is intended to be easier to apply and more successful in preventing the transmission of diseases. As of 2009, the spray-on condom was not going to market because the drying time could not be reduced below two to three minutes.

The Invisible Condom, developed at Université Laval in Quebec, Canada, is a gel that hardens upon increased temperature after insertion into the vagina or rectum. In the lab, it has been shown to effectively block HIV and herpes simplex virus. The barrier breaks down and liquefies after several hours. As of 2005, the invisible condom is in the clinical trial phase, and has not yet been approved for use.

Also developed in 2005 is a condom treated with an erectogenic compound. The drug-treated condom is intended to help the wearer maintain an erection, which should also help reduce slippage. If approved, the condom would be marketed under the Durex brand. As of 2007, it was still in clinical trials. In 2009, Ansell Healthcare, the makers of Lifestyle condoms, introduced the X2 condom lubricated with "Excite Gel" which contains the amino acid L-arginine and is intended to improve the strength of the erectile response.

In March 2013, philanthropist Bill Gates offered US$100,000 grants through his foundation for a condom design that "significantly preserves or enhances pleasure" to encourage more males to adopt the use of condoms for safer sex. The grant information stated: "The primary drawback from the male perspective is that condoms decrease pleasure as compared to no condom, creating a trade-off that many men find unacceptable, particularly given that the decisions about use must be made just prior to intercourse. Is it possible to develop a product without this stigma, or better, one that is felt to enhance pleasure?" In November of the same year, 11 research teams were selected to receive the grant money.

== See also ==
- Condoman
