= Latex =

Stable dispersion of polymer microparticles in an aqueous medium

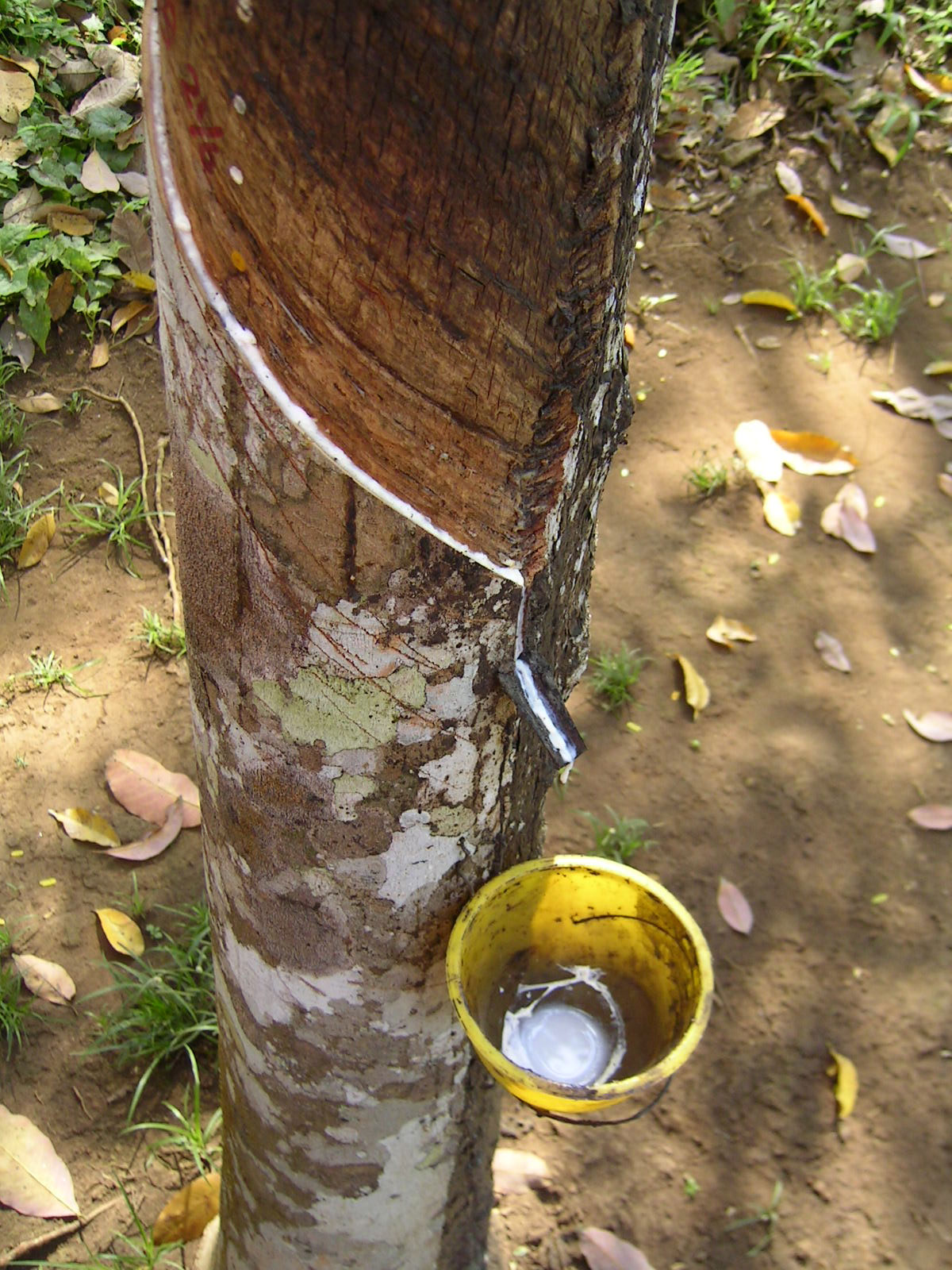
Tapping of latex from Hevea brasiliensis, for use in rubber production

Latex (pl. latices) is an emulsion (stable dispersion) of polymer microparticles in water. Latices are found in nature, but synthetic latices are common as well.

In nature, latex is found as a milky fluid, which is present in 10% of all flowering plants (angiosperms) and in some mushrooms (especially species of Lactarius). It is a complex emulsion that coagulates on exposure to air, consisting of proteins, alkaloids, starches, sugars, oils, tannins, resins, and gums. It is usually exuded after tissue injury. In most plants, latex is white, but some have yellow, orange, or scarlet latex. The fungus Lactarius indigo has a vivid blue latex. Since the 17th century, latex has been used as a term for the fluid substance in plants, deriving from the Latin word for 'liquid'. It serves mainly as defense against herbivores and fungivores.

Latex is not to be confused with plant sap; it is a distinct substance, separately produced, and with different functions. The word latex is also used to refer to natural latex rubber, particularly non-vulcanized rubber. Such is the case in products like latex gloves, latex condoms, latex clothing, and balloons.

The IUPAC definition of latex is "colloidal dispersion of polymer particles in a liquid". The polymer in the particles may be organic or inorganic. The IUPAC definition of "synthetic latex" is "latex obtained as a product of an emulsion, mini-emulsion, micro-emulsion, or dispersion polymerization".

== Biology ==
=== Articulated laticifers ===
The cells (laticifers) in which latex is found make up the laticiferous system, which can form in two very different ways. In many plants, the laticiferous system is formed from rows of cells laid down in the meristem of the stem or root. The cell walls between these cells are dissolved so that continuous tubes, called latex vessels, are formed. Since these vessels are made of many cells, they are known as articulated laticifers. This method of formation is found in the poppy family and in the rubber trees (Para rubber tree, members of the family Euphorbiaceae, members of the mulberry and fig family, such as the Panama rubber tree Castilla elastica), and members of the family Asteraceae. For instance, Parthenium argentatum the guayule plant, is in the tribe Heliantheae; other latex-bearing Asteraceae with articulated laticifers include members of the Cichorieae, a clade whose members produce latex, some of them in commercially interesting amounts. This includes Taraxacum kok-saghyz, a species cultivated for latex production.

=== Non-articulated laticifers ===
In the milkweed and spurge families, on the other hand, the laticiferous system is formed quite differently. Early in the development of the seedling, latex cells differentiate, and as the plant grows these latex cells grow into a branching system extending throughout the plant. In many euphorbs, the entire structure is made from a single cell – this type of system is known as a non-articulated laticifer, to distinguish it from the multi-cellular structures discussed above. In the mature plant, the entire laticiferous system is descended from a single cell or group of cells present in the embryo.

The laticiferous system is present in all parts of the mature plant, including roots, stems, leaves, and sometimes the fruits. It is particularly noticeable in the cortical tissues. Latex is usually exuded as a white liquid, but in some cases it can be clear, yellow or red, as in Cannabaceae.

== Productive species ==
Latex is produced by 20,000 flowering plant species from over 40 families. These include both dicots and monocots. Latex has been found in 14 percent of tropical plant species, as well as six percent of temperate plant species. Several members of the fungal kingdom also produce latex upon injury, such as Lactarius deliciosus and other milk-caps. This suggests it is the product of convergent evolution and has been selected for on many separate occasions.

== Defense function ==
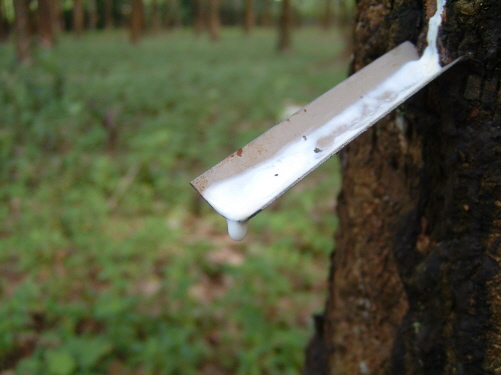
Rubber tapping latex

Latex functions to protect plants from herbivores and fungi from fungivores. The idea was first proposed in 1887 by Joseph F. James, who noted that latex of milkweed "carries with it at the same time such disagreeable properties that it becomes a better protection to the plant from enemies than all the thorns, prickles, or hairs that could be provided. In this plant, so copious and so distasteful has the sap become that it serves a most important purpose in its economy". Evidence showing this defense function include the finding that slugs will eat leaves drained of their latex but not intact ones, that many insects sever the veins carrying latex before they feed, and that the latex of Asclepias humistrata (sandhill milkweed) kills by trapping 30% of newly hatched monarch butterfly caterpillars. This has also been found in fungi, with fewer arthropods infesting latex-producing Lactarius than non-latex-producing Russula. In feeding experiments using Lactarius, Ambigolimax valentianus slugs avoid feeding on mushrooms that are exuding latex.

Other evidence is that latex contains 50–1000× higher concentrations of defense substances than other plant tissues. These toxins include ones that are also toxic to the plant and consist of a diverse range of chemicals that are either poisonous or "antinutritive."

Latex is actively moved to the area of injury; in the case of Cryptostegia grandiflora, latex more than 70 cm from the site of injury is mobilized. The large hydrostatic pressure in this vine enables an extremely high flow rate of latex. In a 1935 report the botanist Catherine M. Bangham observed that "piercing the fruit stalk of Cryptostegia grandiflora produced a jet of latex over a meter long, and maintained [this jet] for several seconds."

The clotting property of latex is functional in this defense since it limits wastage and its stickiness traps insects and their mouthparts.

While there exist other explanations for the existence of latex including storage and movement of plant nutrients, waste, and maintenance of water balance that "[e]ssentially none of these functions remain credible and none have any empirical support".

== Applications ==
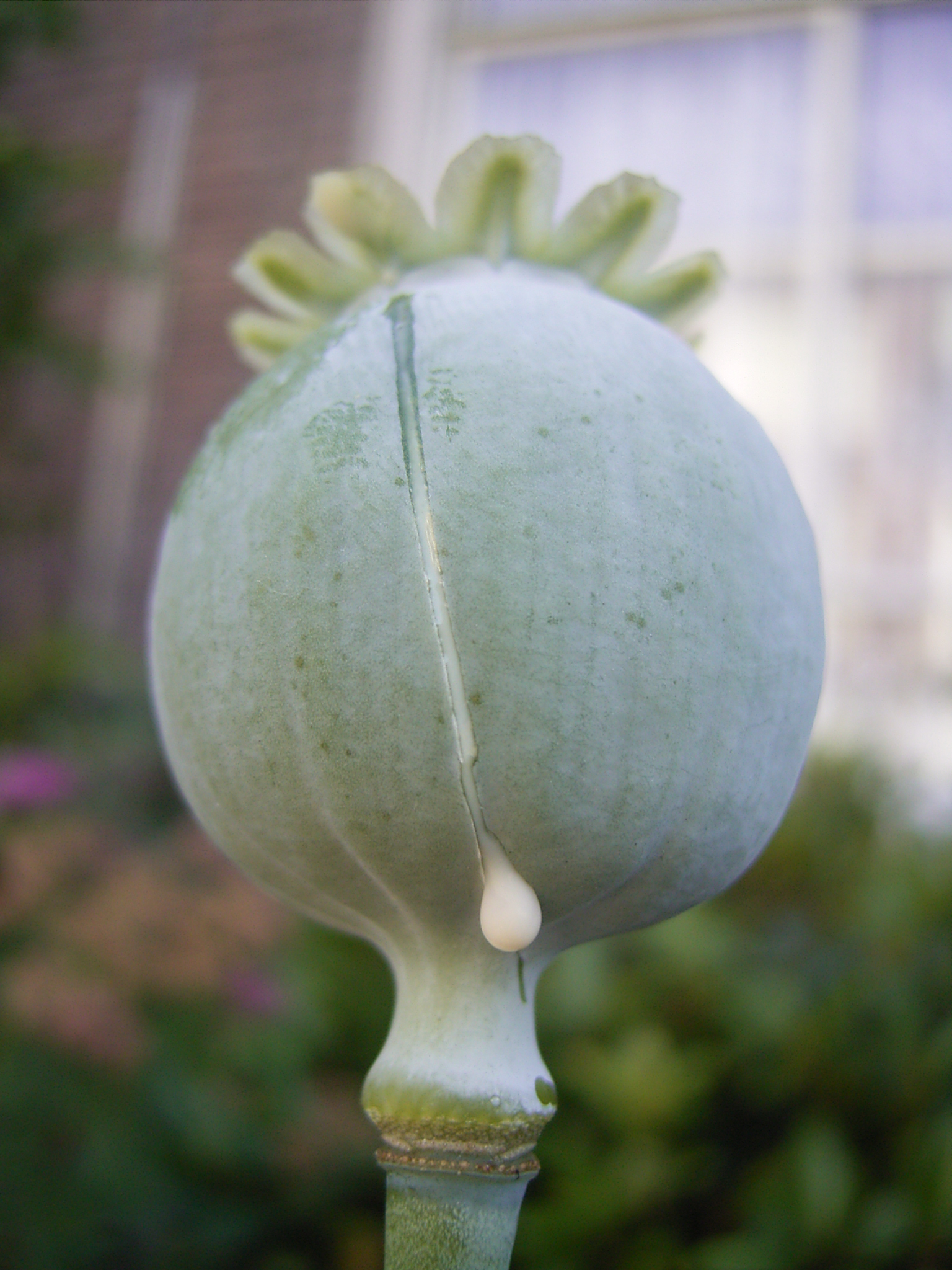
Opium poppy exuding fresh latex from a cut

The latex of many species can be processed to produce many materials.

- Balatá and gutta percha latex contain an inelastic polymer related to rubber.
- Chicle and jelutong tree latex was used in chewing gum.

=== Personal and healthcare products ===
Natural rubber is the most important product obtained from latex; more than 12,000 plant species yield latex containing rubber, though in the vast majority of those species the rubber is not suitable for commercial use. This latex is used to make many other products including mattresses, gloves, swim caps, condoms, catheters and balloons.

=== Opium and opiates ===
Dried latex from the opium poppy is called opium, the source of several useful analgesic alkaloids such as codeine, thebaine, and morphine, the latter two of which can then further be used in the synthesis and manufacture of other (typically stronger) opioids for medicinal use, and of heroin for the illegal drug trade. The opium poppy is also the source of medically useful non-analgesic alkaloids, such as papaverine and noscapine.

=== Clothing ===
Latex is used in many types of clothing. Worn on the body (or applied directly by painting), it tends to be skin-tight, producing a "second skin" effect.

=== Coatings and glues ===
Synthetic latices are used in coatings (e.g., latex paint) and glues because they solidify by coalescence of the polymer particles as the water evaporates. These synthetic latices therefore can form films without releasing potentially toxic organic solvents in the environment. Other uses include cement additives and to conceal information on scratchcards. Latex, usually styrene-based, is also used in immunoassays.

== Health and safety ==
Among those people allergic to latex, some only experience a mild allergy when exposed, with symptoms such as eczema, contact dermatitis, or developing a rash. Others have a serious latex allergy, and exposure to latex products such as latex gloves can cause anaphylactic shock. Guayule latex has only 2% of the levels of protein found in Hevea latices, and it is being researched as a lower-allergen substitute. Additionally, chemical processes may be employed to reduce the amount of antigenic protein in Hevea latex, yielding alternative materials such as Vytex Natural Rubber Latex which provide significantly reduced exposure to latex allergens.

In some plants, latex may contain irritating substances; in the poinsettia it can cause local irritation of the skin and mucous membranes. In tests of the latex of the Poinsettia, some volunteers developed mild skin reactions. The milky-white sap in the leaves and stems of the plant can cause mild skin irritation.

About half of people with spina bifida are also allergic to natural latex rubber. People who have had multiple surgeries and who have had prolonged exposure to natural latex are also more susceptible to a latex allergy.

Many people with latex allergy also experience allergic reactions to certain fruits. This association has led to research regarding latex-fruit syndrome (LFS). This is a phenomenon characterized by cross-reactivity between natural latex rubber allergens and certain fruit allergens, leading to allergic reactions in sensitized individuals. It was described for the first time by Blanco et al. in 1994.

In a 2024 comprehensive review by Gromek et al., the last 30 years of research on LFS were summarized, focusing on its prevalence, common cross-reactions, and clinical manifestations. The review found that the prevalence of LFS in latex-allergic patients varies widely, ranging from 4% to 88%, depending on diagnostic methods, geographical regions, and study populations. The most commonly implicated fruits in LFS include banana, avocado, kiwifruit, and papaya. Clinical manifestations are predominantly systemic, with 73% of hypersensitivity symptoms being systemic and 27% localized. Gromek et al. also highlighted the need for standardized diagnostic criteria and severity grading systems to improve the accuracy of LFS diagnosis and treatment.

=== Microbial degradation ===
Several species of the microbe genera Actinomycetes, Streptomyces, Nocardia, Micromonospora, and Actinoplanes are capable of consuming rubber latex. However, the rate of biodegradation is slow, and the growth of bacteria utilizing rubber as a sole carbon source is also slow.
