= Latex allergy =

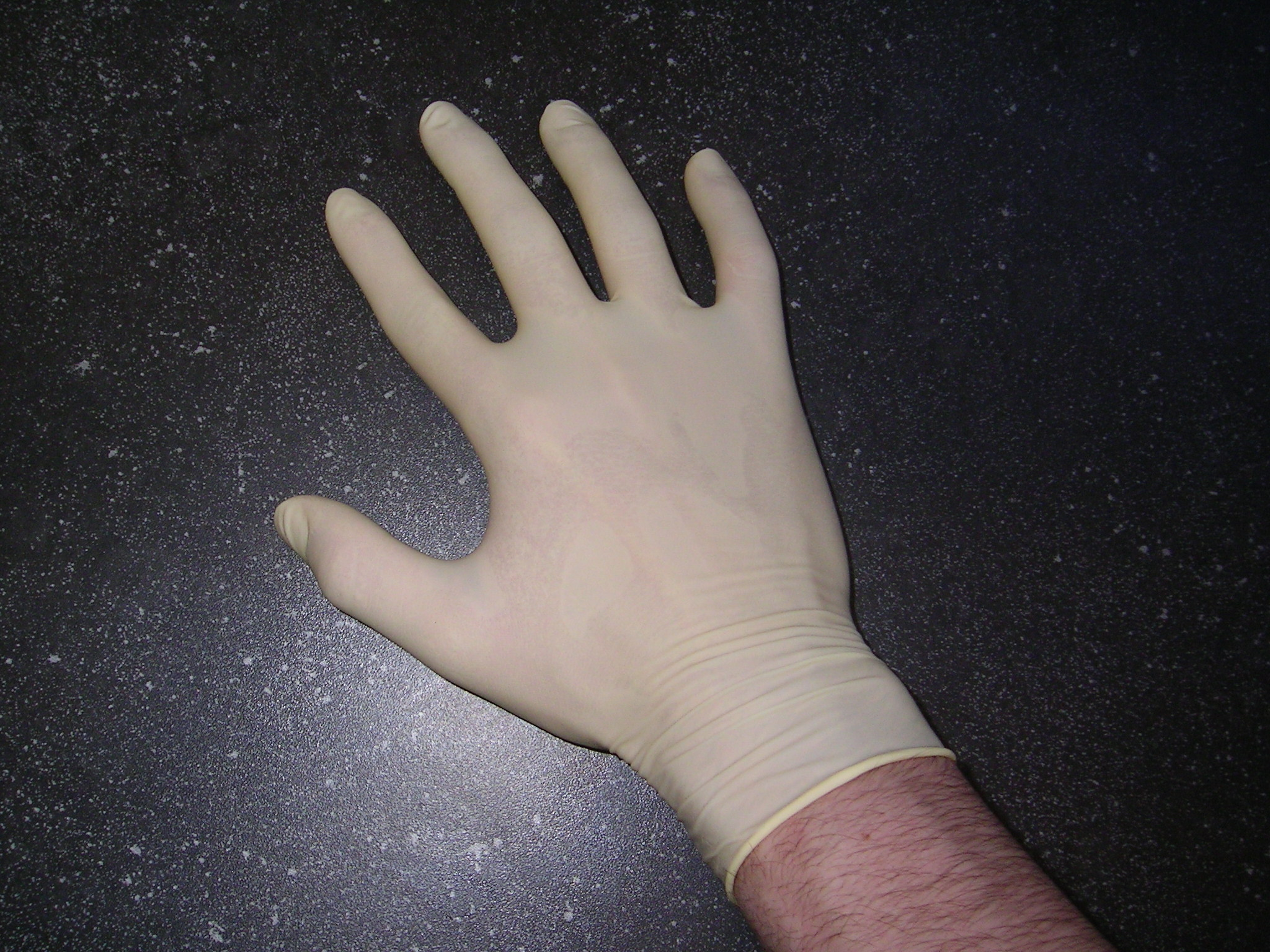
- Latex medical glove
- Specialty: Immunology

Latex allergy is a medical term encompassing a range of allergic reactions to the proteins present in natural rubber latex. It generally develops after repeated exposure to products containing natural rubber latex. When latex-containing medical devices or supplies come in contact with mucous membranes, the membranes may absorb latex proteins. In some susceptible people, the immune system produces antibodies that react immunologically with these antigenic proteins. Many items contain or are made from natural rubber, including shoe soles, pen grips, hot water bottles, elastic bands, rubber gloves, condoms, baby-bottle nipples, and balloons; consequently, there are many possible routes of exposure that may trigger a reaction. People with latex allergies may also have or develop allergic reactions to some fruits, such as bananas.

== Signs and symptoms ==
Allergic reactions to latex range from Type I hypersensitivity, the most serious form of reaction, to Type IV hypersensitivity. Rate of onset is directly proportional to the degree of allergy: Type I responses will begin showing symptoms within minutes of exposure to latex, while Type IV responses may take hours or days to appear.

Most commonly, latex allergy presents with hives at the point of contact, followed by rhinitis. The most common physiological reaction to latex exposure is dermatitis at the point of contact, which gives way to soreness, itching, and redness. Angioedema is also a common response to oral, vaginal, or rectal contact.

Symptoms of more severe hypersensitivity include both local and generalized hives; feelings of faintness or impending doom; angioedema; nausea and vomiting; abdominal cramps; rhinitis; bronchospasm; and anaphylaxis. Type IV responses typically include erythema, blistering (forming vesicles and papules), itching, and crusting at the point of contact. This irritant contact dermatitis is considered a nonimmune reaction to latex. The degree of reaction is directly proportional to the duration of exposure, as well as skin temperature.

Among those with a latex allergy, 40% will experience irritant contact dermatitis; 33.1% will experience a Type I allergic reaction; 20.4% will experience Type IV allergic contact dermatitis; and 6.5% will experience both Type I and Type IV symptoms.

== Causes ==
=== Occupational exposure ===
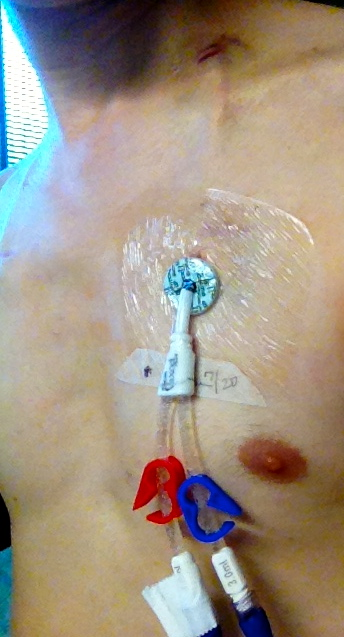
Central line with latex cap

The prevalence of latex allergy is greater in certain populations with increased exposure and has historically been studied in this context. Specifically, regular and prolonged occupational exposure to latex is a known risk factor for the development of an allergy. Healthcare workers, dental specialists, food service workers, cosmetologists, rubber industry workers, law enforcement personnel, and painters are among some of the highest-risk occupations. It is estimated that the worldwide prevalence of latex allergy in healthcare workers is 9.7%-12.4%.

Latex allergy became a more common problem in healthcare in the 1980s and 1990s with the adoption of universal precautions, which involved frequent use of latex gloves, with the emergence of HIV/AIDs. The rates of latex allergy dropped to 4-7% in the healthcare setting with the widespread introduction of non-powdered latex gloves. On December 19, 2016, the FDA officially banned the use of powdered gloves in the US healthcare setting, citing the unnecessary burden of potential injury due to allergy. General latex avoidance protocols have been put in to place in healthcare settings in the US and many other developed countries with the switch to nitrile gloves. However, latex exposure in healthcare settings in developing countries from latex gloves or latex components of medical devices such as urinary catheters, dialysis ports, or vial stoppers, remains a significant concern.

=== Alternative latex exposure ===
While most reported allergic reactions to latex have occurred in medical settings, non-healthcare workers show similar levels of latex antibodies, suggesting that they are sensitized to natural rubber latex through other sources, both inside the home and as medical patients. In particular, individuals with chronic health concerns that lead to repeated surgeries or catheterizations thus experience greater exposure to latex allergens and may develop an allergy. Outside of hospital environments, latex allergy may develop in amateur and professional athletes whose sports equipment includes natural rubber, such as swimsuits or running shoes. Rubber basketballs, in particular, may lead to contact dermatitis on the hands and fingertips. The sensitization to latex in athletes may be accelerated by the use of topical analgesics and other agents that diminish the skin barrier and increase contact. It has also been hypothesized that young children may develop a latex allergy due to exposure in the home and school environment from objects such as rubber balloons, boots, gloves, and toys.

=== Spina bifida ===
People with spina bifida often have latex allergies. Up to 68% of children with this condition will have a reaction to latex. The mechanism of this association between spina bifida and latex allergy is not clearly defined. However, spina bifida patients may become sensitized to latex early in life as they often require frequent surgeries and medical procedures that involve exposure to latex products. The most important latex allergens which sensitize spina bifida patients are: Hev b 1, Her b 3 and Hev b 6.01.

=== Latex-fruit syndrome ===
People who have latex allergy also may have or develop an allergic response to some plants and/or products of these plants (such as fruits). This is known as latex-fruit syndrome (LFS). This syndrome was described for the first time by Bianco et al. in 1994. Recent review by Gromek published in 2024, have summarised the last 30 years of research on LFS and analyzed 14 original studies.The analysis of original studies demonstrated a significant variability in the prevalence of latex-fruit syndrome (LFS), ranging from 4% to 88%. This variation was attributed to the use of diverse diagnostic tools, differences in geographical regions, and the size of study populations. The most commonly reported allergenic fruits among patients with LFS were banana, avocado, kiwifruit, and papaya.

The primary latex allergens implicated in latex-fruit syndrome (LFS) include Hev b 2, Hev b 6.02, Hev b 7, Hev b 8, and Hev b 12. Genetic studies have suggested an association between LFS and specific human leukocyte antigen (HLA) types, particularly HLA-DQB1*0201, DRB1*0301, DRB1*0901, and the HLA-DR functional group E.

==== Pathomechanism ====
One group of allergens that may contribute to the cross-reactivity between latex and certain fruits is chitinases. These enzymes catalyze the breakdown of β-1,4-N-acetyl-D-glucosamine bonds in chitin, a polymer widely found in nature. Chitinases are produced by various organisms, including bacteria, fungi, insects, plants, and vertebrates. Class I chitinases identified in fruits such as bananas (Mus a 2) and avocados (Pers a 1) have been shown to cross-react with class I chitinases in latex, specifically Hev b 6.01 (Prohevein) and Hev b 6.02 (Hevein). Chitinases have also been found in other fruits, including chestnut (class I), tomato (class II), Indian jujube (class III), raspberry (class III), and grape (class IV). However, in the case of kiwi and papaya, no specific allergens with chitinase activity have been identified to date. Other latex allergens involved in cross-reactivity with fruits may include profilins, glucanases, and non-specific lipid transfer proteins (nsLTPs).

Natural rubber latex contains several conformational epitopes located on several enzymes such as Hev b 1, Hev b 2, Hev b 4, Hev b 5 and Hev b 6.02.

Evaluation of hypersensitivity symptoms revealed that systemic allergic reactions accounted for 73% of reported cases, while only 27% presented with localized allergic manifestations.

FITkit is a latex allergen testing method for quantification of the major natural rubber latex specific allergens: Hev b 1, Hev b 3, Hev b 5, and Hev b 6.02.

== Prevention ==
The most effective form of primary prevention towards latex sensitization is limiting or completely avoiding contact with latex, particularly among children with risk factors such as spina bifida. The limitation of powdered latex glove use in hospital settings has also proven an effective primary prevention strategy among adult health care workers, and as secondary prevention for sensitized individuals.

== Epidemiology ==
Latex allergy is uncommon in the general population, at least compared to high-risk groups such as hospital workers and spina bifida patients. Estimates suggest a worldwide prevalence of around 4.3% among the general population. Between 1% and 6% of the general population in the United States has latex allergy; assays of antibody levels in the blood suggest that 2.7 million to 16 million Americans are affected by some form of latex sensitivity. Females are approximately three times as likely as males to have latex allergies. Possible risk factors for the female population include increased employment in high-risk occupations and enhanced histamine release caused by female hormones.

== Alternatives ==
Alternatives to latex include:

- Synthetic rubbers (such as elastane, neoprene, nitrile) and artificially synthesized polyisoprene latex, which do not contain the proteins from the Hevea brasiliensis tree.
- Products made from guayule natural rubber emulsions, which also do not contain the proteins from the Hevea rubber tree, and do not cause allergy in persons sensitized to Hevea proteins.
- Alternative materials like Vytex Natural Rubber Latex which reduce exposure to latex allergens while otherwise retaining the properties of natural rubber; these are made using chemical treatment to reduce the amount of antigenic proteins in Hevea latex.
- Polyurethane.

The first polyurethane condoms, designed for people with latex allergies, were produced in 1994.

Some people are so sensitive that they may still have a reaction to replacement products made from alternative materials. This can occur when the alternative products are manufactured in the same facility as latex-containing products, leaving trace quantities of natural rubber latex on the non-latex products.

== See also ==
- Food allergy
- Food intolerance
- List of allergies
- Oral allergy syndrome
