= Polyisoprene =

Group of synthetic polymers, including cis-1,4-polyisoprene

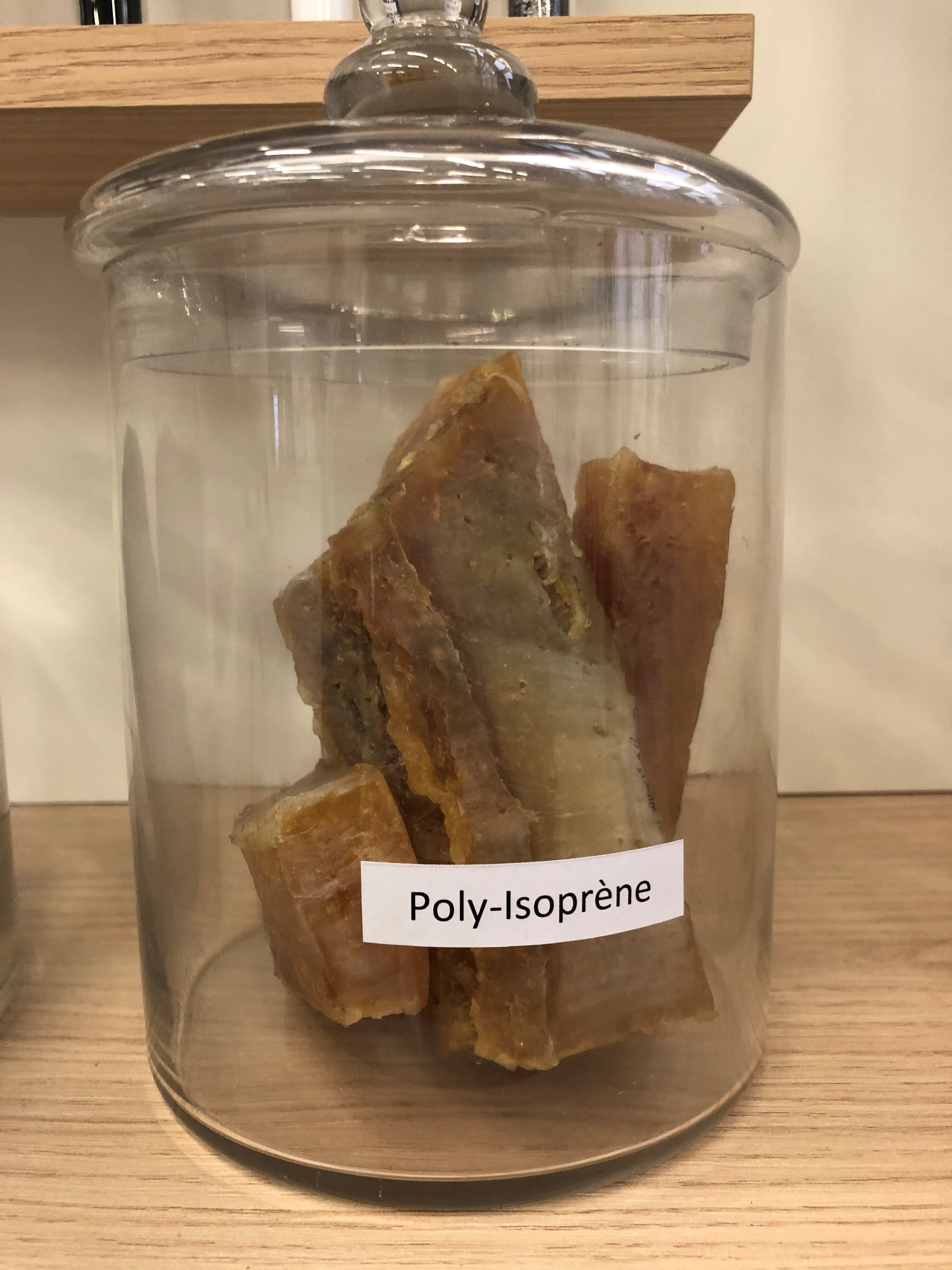
Pieces of polyisoprene in Hutchinson's Research and Innovation center in France

Polyisoprene is, strictly speaking, a collective name for polymers that are produced by polymerization of isoprene. In practice polyisoprene is commonly used to refer to synthetic cis-1,4-polyisoprene, made by the industrial polymerisation of isoprene. Natural forms of polyisoprene are also used in substantial quantities, the most important being "natural rubber" (99.99% cis-1,4-polyisoprene), which is derived from the sap of trees. Both synthetic polyisoprene and natural rubber are highly elastic and consequently used in a variety of applications, such as making tires.

The trans isomer, which is much harder than the cis isomer, has also seen significant use in the past. It too has been synthesised and extracted from plant sap, the latter resin being known as gutta-percha. These were widely used as an electrical insulator and as components of golf balls. Annual worldwide production of synthetic polyisoprene was 13 million tons in 2007 and 16 million tons in 2020.

== Synthesis ==
Four isomers of polyisoprene

In principle, the polymerization of isoprene can result in four different isomers. The relative amount of each isomer in the polymer is dependent on the mechanism of the polymerization reaction.

Anionic chain polymerization, which is initiated by n-Butyllithium, produces cis-1,4-polyisoprene dominant polyisoprene. 90–92% of repeating units are cis-1,4-, 2–3% trans-1,4- and 6–7% 3,4-units.

Coordinative chain polymerization: With Ziegler–Natta catalyst TiCl_{4}/Al(i-C_{4}H_{9})_{3}, a more pure cis-1,4-polyisoprene similar to natural rubber is formed. With Ziegler–Natta catalyst VCl_{3}/Al(i-C_{4}H_{9})_{3}, trans-dominant polyisoprene is formed.

1,2 and 3,4 dominant polyisoprene is produced MoO_{2}Cl_{2} catalyst supported by phosphorus ligand and Al(OPhCH_{3})(i-Bu)_{2} co-catalyst.

== History ==
The first reported commercialisation of a stereoregular poly-1,4-isoprene with > 90% cis (90% to 92%) was in 1960 by the Shell Chemical Company. Shell used an alkyl lithium catalyst. 90% cis-1,4 content proved insufficiently crystalline to be useful.

In 1962, Goodyear succeeded in making a 98.5% cis polymer using a Ziegler-Natta catalyst, and this went on to commercial success.

== Usage ==
Natural rubber and synthetic polyisoprene are used primarily for tires. Other applications include latex products, footwear, belting, hoses, and condoms.

Natural gutta-percha and synthetic trans-1,4-polyisoprene were used for golf balls.

== See also ==
- Synthetic rubber
