= Vytex Natural Rubber Latex =

Vytex Natural Rubber Latex (NRL) is a brand of natural rubber latex produced and marketed by Vystar Corporation. Vytex NRL is an alternative material to petroleum-based synthetics and traditional (Hevea) natural rubber latex. Protein test results show that Vytex NRL typically has 90% fewer antigenic proteins than Hevea natural rubber latex.

Physical properties of Vytex include barrier protection, elasticity, tactile sensitivity, strength, comfort and fit. Vytex comes in two grades: Vytex high ammonia (Vytex HA) for surgical, exam and rubber gloves, catheters and balloons, and Vytex low ammonia (Vytex LA) for adhesive and foam applications.

In May 2009 the U.S. Food and Drug Administration granted 510(k) clearance to market and sell a condom made with Vytex that contains less than 2 μg/dm^{2} of antigenic proteins.

Vytex was created in 2005 by a global team of scientists including Travis Honeycutt, who holds more than 100 patents. Vystar holds two U.S. patents, an additional pending application, and multiple international patent filings for Vytex NRL.

Vytex is produced by Revertex Malaysia and distributed by Centrotrade Minerals and Metals, Inc.

In May 2018, Vystar acquired the assets of UV Flu Technologies.

== Antigenic proteins ==
According to the Centers for Disease Control and Prevention, proteins in latex cause a range of allergic reactions. Allergies to latex are most common in healthcare workers, although there is a lack of awareness among nurses that frequent exposure to latex triggers latex allergy.

Natural rubber latex contains over 200 proteins, similar to other natural plant materials, of which 13 are known allergens. Vytex NRL is created through a process that significantly reduces these proteins.

== Scientific process ==
Vytex Natural Rubber Latex comes from the Hevea brasiliensis rubber tree, which is primarily cultivated in Southeast Asia. Natural rubber latex is a cloudy white liquid collected by cutting a thin strip of bark from the tree and allowing the latex to be secreted into a collection cup over a period of several hours. After collection, the latex is treated with ammonia to prevent coagulation and is transported to a processing facility for concentrating and compounding.

Aluminium hydroxide, an amphoteric protein binding chemical, is added to the latex source material while still in liquid form to complex and remove the antigenic proteins. Aluminium hydroxide can form a jelly-like structure suspending any unwanted materials in water, including bacteria. Under certain conditions, it produces protein complexes that are removed from the Vytex NRL solution.

== Testing for levels of proteins ==
Samples of treated Vytex NRL are subjected to the Modified Lowry ASTM D5712-05 test, used to measure the total extractable proteins in natural rubber latex, and the ELISA Inhibition ASTM D6499-07 test, used to test for antigenic latex proteins.

Un-leached sample films and products made with Vytex NRL have been independently tested for protein levels at three time intervals: immediately after production, after 21 days of storage, and after 6 months of storage.

Test results during all phases of protein testing generated less than 10 ug/dm² of antigenic protein using the ELISA protein test method. Products made from Vytex NRL under similar conditions used for Hevea natural rubber latex production frequently exhibit less than 0.2 ug/dm² of antigenic protein. Overall, Vytex NRL typically has 90% fewer antigenic proteins than Hevea natural rubber latex.

== See also ==
- Latex allergen testing
