= History of condoms =

The history of condoms goes back at least several centuries, and perhaps beyond. For most of their history, condoms have been used both as a method of birth control, and as a protective measure against sexually transmitted infections such as syphilis, gonorrhea, chlamydia, hepatitis B and more recently HIV/AIDS. Condoms have been made from a variety of materials; prior to the 19th century, chemically treated linen and animal tissue (intestine or bladder) are the best documented varieties. Rubber condoms gained popularity in the mid-19th century, and in the early 20th century major advances were made in manufacturing techniques. Prior to the introduction of the combined oral contraceptive pill, condoms were the most popular birth control method in the Western world. In the second half of the 20th century, the low cost of condoms contributed to their importance in family planning programs throughout the developing world. Condoms have also become increasingly important in efforts to fight the AIDS pandemic.

== Antiquity ==
Whether condoms were used in ancient civilizations is debated by archaeologists and historians. Societies in the ancient civilizations of Egypt, Greece, and Rome preferred small families and are known to have practiced a variety of birth control methods. However, these societies viewed birth control as a woman's responsibility, and the only well-documented contraception methods were female-controlled devices (both possibly effective, such as pessaries, and ineffective, such as amulets). The writings of these societies contain subtle references to male-controlled contraceptive methods that might have been condoms, but most historians interpret them as referring to coitus interruptus or anal intercourse.

The loincloths worn by Egyptian and Greek laborers were very sparse, sometimes consisting of little more than a covering for the glans of the penis. Records of these types of loincloths being worn by men in higher classes have made some historians speculate they were worn during intercourse; others, however, are doubtful of such interpretations. Historians may also cite one legend of Minos, related by Antoninus Liberalis in 150 AD, as suggestive of condom use in ancient societies. This legend describes a curse that caused Minos' semen to contain serpents and scorpions. To protect his sexual partner from these animals, Minos used a goat's bladder as an internal condom.

Contraceptives fell out of use in Europe after the decline of the Western Roman Empire in the 5th century; the use of contraceptive pessaries, for example, is not documented again until the 15th century. If condoms were used during the Roman Empire, knowledge of them may have been lost during its decline. In the writings of Muslims and Jews during the Middle Ages, there are some references to attempts at male-controlled contraception, including suggestions to cover the penis in tar or soak it in onion juice. Some of these writings might describe condom use, but they are "oblique", "veiled", and "vague".

== 1500s to the 1800s ==
=== Renaissance ===
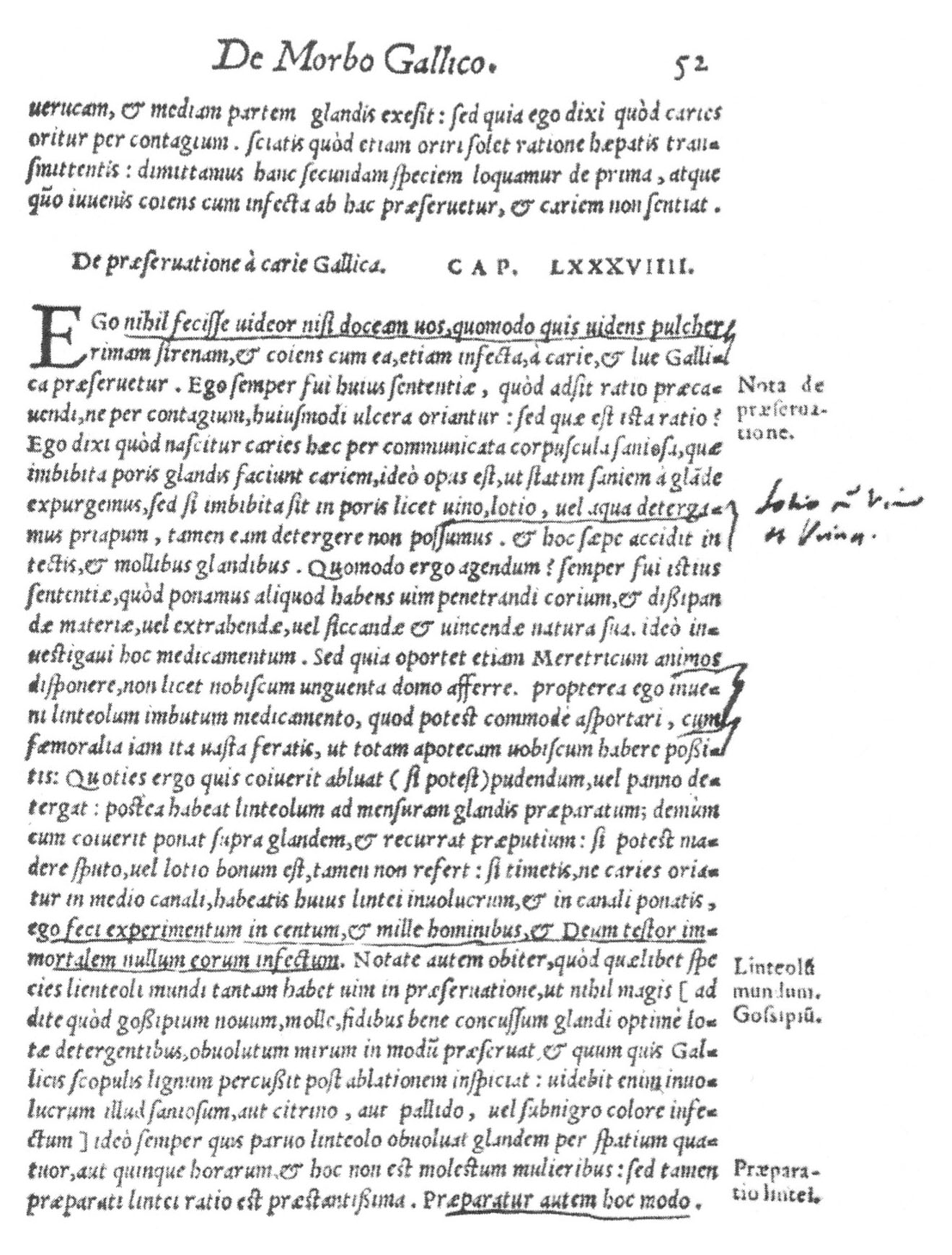
A page from De Morbo Gallico ('On the French Disease'), Gabriele Falloppio's treatise on syphilis. Published in 1564, it describes what is possibly the first use of condoms.

Prior to the 15th century, some use of glans condoms (devices covering only the head of the penis) is recorded in Asia. Glans condoms seem to have been used for birth control, and to have been known only by members of the upper classes. In China, glans condoms may have been made of oiled silk paper, or of lamb intestines. In Japan, condoms called Kabuto-gata (甲形) were made of tortoise shell or animal horn. In England, there is evidence that condoms made of animal organs were available in the time of Henry VIII (the mid-1500s).

The first well-documented outbreak of what is now known as syphilis occurred in 1494 among French troops. The disease then swept across Europe. As Jared Diamond describes it, "when syphilis was first definitely recorded in Europe in 1495, its pustules often covered the body from the head to the knees, caused flesh to fall from people's faces, and led to death within a few months." (The disease is less frequently fatal today.) By 1505, the disease had spread to Asia, and within a few decades had "decimated large areas of China".

In 16th-century Italy, Gabriele Falloppio authored the earliest uncontested description of condom use. De Morbo Gallico ("The French Disease", referring to syphilis) was published in 1564, two years after Falloppio's death. In this tract, he recommended use of a device he claimed to have invented: linen sheaths soaked in a chemical solution and allowed to dry before use. The cloths he described were sized to cover the glans of the penis, and were held on with a ribbon. Fallopio claimed to have performed an experimental trial of the linen sheath on 1100 men, and reported that none of them had contracted the dreaded disease.

After the publication of De Morbo Gallico, use of penis coverings to protect from disease is described in a wide variety of literature throughout Europe. The first indication these devices were used for birth control, rather than disease prevention, is the 1605 theological publication De iustitia et iure (On justice and law) by Catholic theologian Leonardus Lessius: he condemned them as immoral. The first explicit description that un petit linge (a small cloth) was used to prevent pregnancy is from 1655: a French novel and play titled L'Escole des Filles (The Philosophy of Girls). In 1666, the English Birth Rate Commission attributed a recent downward fertility rate to use of "condons", the first documented use of that word (or any similar spelling).

In addition to linen, condoms during the Renaissance were made out of intestines and bladder. Cleaned and prepared intestine for use in glove making had been sold commercially since at least the 13th century. Condoms made from bladder and dating to the 1640s were discovered in an English privy; it is believed they were used by soldiers of King Charles I. Dutch traders introduced condoms made from "fine leather" to Japan. Unlike the horn condoms used previously, these leather condoms covered the entire penis.

The oldest condoms ever excavated were found in a cesspit located in the grounds of Dudley Castle and were made from animal membrane; dating back to as early as 1642.

=== 18th century ===
Written references to condom use became much more common during the 18th century. Not all of the attention was positive: in 1708, John Campbell unsuccessfully asked Parliament to make the devices illegal. Noted English physician Daniel Turner condemned the condom, publishing his arguments against their use in 1717. He disliked condoms because they did not offer full protection against syphilis. He also seems to have argued that belief in the protection condoms encouraged men to engage in sex with unsafe partners, but then, because of the loss of sensation caused by condoms, these same men often neglected to actually use the devices. The French medical professor Jean Astruc wrote his own anti-condom treatise in 1736, citing Turner as the authority in this area. Physicians later in the 18th century also spoke against the condom, but not on medical grounds: rather, they expressed the belief that contraception was immoral.

The condom market grew rapidly, however. 18th-century condoms were available in a variety of qualities and sizes, made from either linen treated with chemicals, or "skin" (bladder or intestine softened by treatment with sulphur and lye). They were sold at pubs, barbershops, chemist shops, open-air markets, and at the theatre throughout Europe and Russia. The first recorded inspection of condom quality is found in the memoirs of Giacomo Casanova (which cover his life until 1774): to test for holes, he would often blow them up before use.

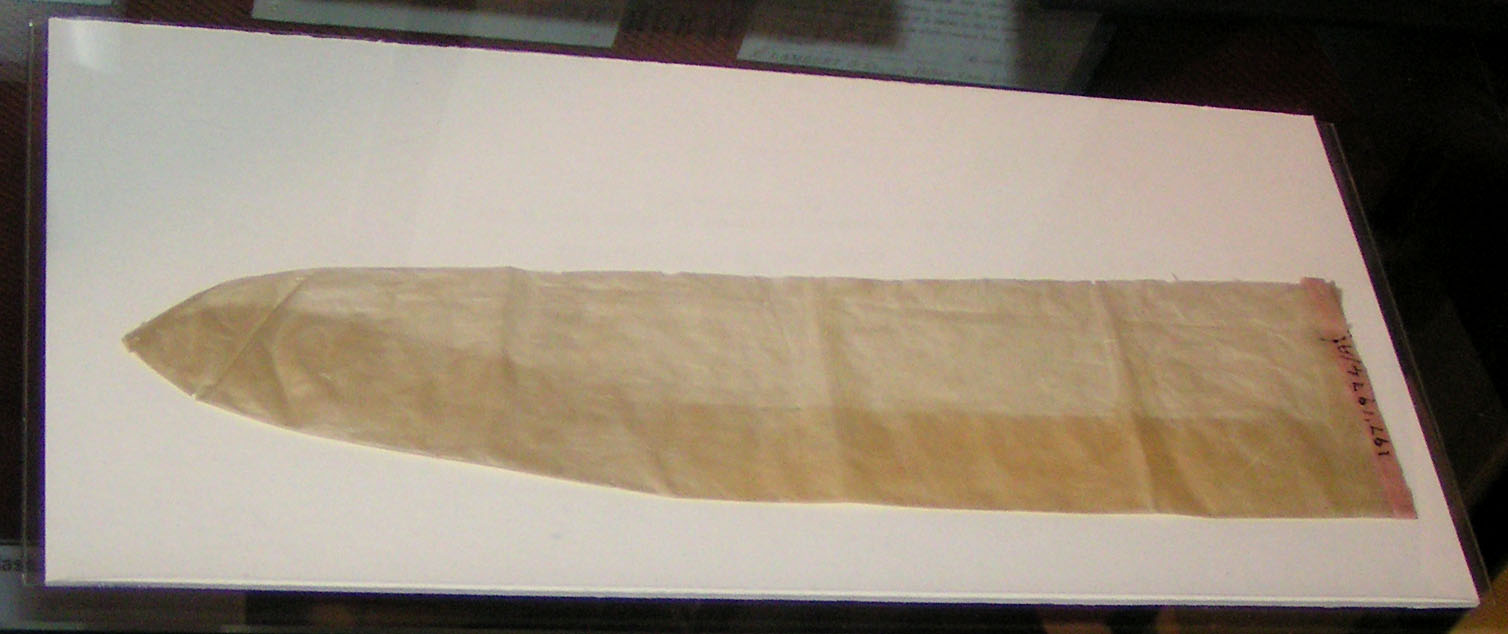
A condom made from animal intestine circa 1900

Couples in colonial America relied on female-controlled methods of contraception if they used contraceptives at all. The first known documents describing American condom use were written around 1800, two to three decades after the American Revolutionary War. Also around 1800, linen condoms lost popularity in the market and their production ceased: they were more expensive and were viewed as less comfortable when compared to skin condoms.

Up to the 19th century, condoms were generally used only by the middle and upper classes. Perhaps more importantly, condoms were unaffordable for many: for a typical prostitute, a single condom might cost several months' pay.

=== Expanded marketing and introduction of rubber ===
The early 19th century saw contraceptives promoted to the poorer classes for the first time: birth control advocates in England included Jeremy Bentham and Richard Carlile, and noted American advocates included Robert Dale Owen and Charles Knowlton. Writers on contraception tended to prefer other methods of birth control, citing both the expense of condoms and their unreliability (they were often riddled with holes, and often fell off or broke), but they discussed condoms as a good option for some, and as the only contraceptive that also protected from disease. One group of British contraceptive advocates distributed condom literature in poor neighborhoods, with instructions on how to make the devices at home; in the 1840s, similar tracts were distributed in both cities and rural areas through the United States.

From the 1820s through the 1870s, popular women and men lecturers traveled around America teaching about physiology and sexual matters. Many of them sold birth control devices, including condoms, after their lectures. They were condemned by many moralists and medical professionals, including America's first female doctor Elizabeth Blackwell. Blackwell accused the lecturers of spreading doctrines of "abortion and prostitution". In the 1840s, advertisements for condoms began to appear in British newspapers, and in 1861 a condom advertisement appeared in The New York Times.

The discovery of the rubber vulcanization process is disputed. Some contest that it was invented by Charles Goodyear in America 1839, and patented in 1844. Other accounts attribute it to Thomas Hancock in Britain in 1843. The first rubber condom was produced in 1855, and by the late 1850s several major rubber companies were mass-producing, among other items, rubber condoms. A main advantage of rubber condoms was their reusability, making them a more economical choice in the long term. Compared to the 19th-century rubber condoms, however, skin condoms were initially cheaper and offered better sensitivity. For these reasons, skin condoms remained more popular than the rubber variety. However, by the end of the 19th century "rubber" had become a euphemism for condoms in countries around the world. For many decades, rubber condoms were manufactured by wrapping strips of raw rubber around penis-shaped moulds, then dipping the wrapped moulds in a chemical solution to cure the rubber. The earliest rubber condoms covered only the glans of the penis; a doctor had to measure each man and order the correct size. Even with the medical fittings, however, glans condoms tended to fall off during use. Rubber manufacturers quickly discovered they could sell more devices by manufacturing full-length one-size-fits-all condoms to be sold in pharmacies.

=== Increased popularity despite legal impediments ===
Distribution of condoms in the United States was limited by passage of the Comstock laws, which included a federal act banning the mailing of contraceptive information (passed in 1873) as well as State laws that banned the manufacture and sale of condoms in thirty states. In Ireland the 1889 Indecent Advertisements Act made it illegal to advertise condoms, although their manufacture and sale remained legal. Contraceptives were illegal in 19th-century Italy and Germany, but condoms were allowed for disease prevention. In Great Britain it was forbidden to sell condoms as prophylactics under the 1917 VD act, so they were marketed as contraceptives rather than as prophylactics, as they were in America. Despite legal obstacles, condoms continued to be readily available in both Europe and America, widely advertised under euphemisms such as male shield and rubber good. In late-19th-century England, condoms were known as "a little something for the weekend". The phrase was commonly used in British barbershops, which were a key retailer of condoms, well into the twentieth century. . Only in the Republic of Ireland, a predominantly Roman Catholic country, were condoms effectively outlawed, where their sale and manufacture remained illegal until the 1970s.

Opposition to condoms did not only come from moralists: by the late 19th century many feminists expressed distrust of the condom as a contraceptive, as its use was controlled and decided upon by men alone. They advocated instead for methods which were controlled by women, such as diaphragms and spermicidal douches. Despite social and legal opposition, at the end of the 19th century the condom was the Western world's most popular birth control method. Two surveys conducted in New York in 1890 and 1900 found that 45% of the women surveyed were using condoms to prevent pregnancy. A survey in Boston just prior to World War I concluded that three million condoms were sold in that city every year.

1870s England saw the founding of the first major condom manufacturing company, E. Lambert and Son of Dalston. In 1882, German immigrant Julius Schmid founded one of the largest and longest-lasting condom businesses, Julius Schmid, Inc. This New York business initially manufactured only skin condoms (in 1890 he was arrested by Anthony Comstock for having almost seven hundred of the devices in his house). In 1912, a German named Julius Fromm developed a new, improved manufacturing technique for condoms: dipping glass molds into a raw rubber solution. Called cement dipping, this method required adding gasoline or benzene to the rubber to make it liquid. In America, Schmid was the first company to use the new technique. Using the new dipping method, French condom manufacturers were the first to add textures to condoms. Fromm was the first company to sell a branded line of condoms, Fromm's Act, which remains popular in Germany today. The Fromms was taken over by the Nazis during the war, and the family fled to Great Britain but could not compete against the powerful London Rubber Company. The condom lines manufactured by Schmid, Sheiks and Ramses, were sold through the late 1990s. Youngs Rubber Company, founded by Merle Youngs in late-19th-century America, introduced the Trojan brand.

Beginning in the second half of the 19th century, American rates of sexually transmitted infections skyrocketed. Causes cited by historians include effects of the American Civil War, and the ignorance of prevention methods promoted by the Comstock laws. To fight the growing epidemic, sexual education classes were introduced to public schools for the first time, teaching about STIs and how they were transmitted. They generally taught that abstinence was the only way to avoid sexually transmitted infections. The medical community and moral watchdogs considered STIs to be punishment for sexual misbehavior. The stigma on victims of these diseases was so great that many hospitals refused to treat people who had syphilis.

== 1900 to present ==
=== World War I to the 1920s ===
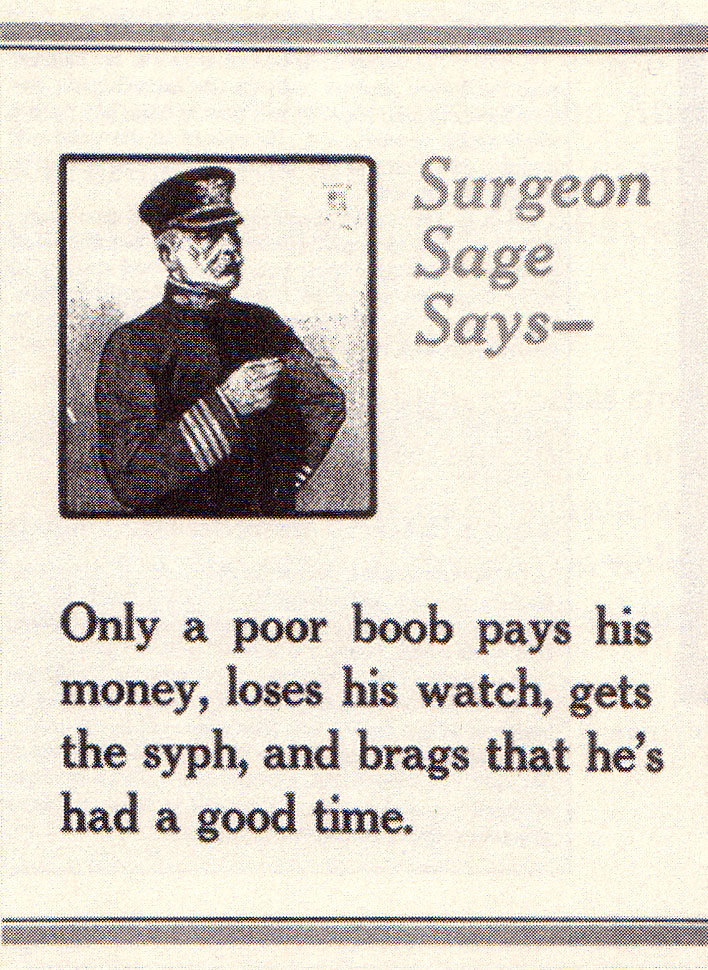
A World War I–era U.S. military poster promoting abstinence

The German military was the first to promote condom use among its soldiers, beginning in the second half of the 19th century. Early-20th-century experiments by the American military concluded that providing condoms to soldiers significantly lowered rates of sexually transmitted infections. During World War I, the United States and (at the beginning of the war only) Britain were the only countries with soldiers in Europe who did not provide condoms and promote their use, although some condoms were provided as an experiment by the Royal Navy. By the end of the war, the American military had diagnosed almost 400,000 cases of syphilis and gonorrhea, a historic high.

From just before 1900 to the beginning of World War I, almost all condoms used in Europe were imported from Germany. Germany not only exported condoms to other European countries, but was a major supplier to Australia, New Zealand, and Canada. During the war, the American companies Schmid and Youngs became the main suppliers of condoms to the European Allies. By the early 1920s, however, most of Europe's condoms were once again made in Germany.

In 1918, just before the end of the war, an American court overturned a conviction against Margaret Sanger. In this case, the judge ruled that condoms could be legally advertised and sold for the prevention of disease. There were still a few state laws against buying and selling contraceptives, and advertising condoms as birth control devices remained illegal in over thirty states. But condoms began to be publicly, legally sold to Americans for the first time in forty-five years. Through the 1920s, catchy names and slick packaging became an increasingly important marketing technique for many consumer items, including condoms and cigarettes. Quality testing became more common, involving filling each condom with air followed by one of several methods intended to detect loss of pressure. Several American companies sold their rejects under cheaper brand names rather than discarding them. Consumers were advised to perform similar tests themselves before use, although few actually did so. Worldwide, condom sales doubled in the 1920s.

Still, there were many prominent opponents of condoms. Marie Stopes objected to the use of condoms ostensibly for medical reasons. Founder of psychoanalysis Sigmund Freud opposed all methods of birth control on the grounds that their failure rates were too high. Freud was especially opposed to the condom because it cut down on sexual pleasure.. Some feminists continued to oppose male-controlled contraceptives such as condoms. Many moralists and medical professionals opposed all methods of contraception. In 1920 the Church of England's Lambeth Conference condemned all "unnatural means of conception avoidance." London's Bishop Arthur Winnington-Ingram complained of the number of condoms discarded in alleyways and parks, especially after weekends and holidays.

In the U.S., condom advertising was legally restricted to their use as disease preventatives. They could be openly marketed as birth control devices in Britain, but purchasing condoms in Britain was socially awkward compared to the U.S. They were generally requested with the euphemism "a little something for the weekend." Boots, the largest pharmacy chain in Britain, stopped selling condoms altogether in the 1920s, a policy that was not reversed until the 1960s. In post-World War I France, the government was concerned about falling birth rates. In response, it outlawed all contraceptives, including condoms. Contraception was also illegal in Spain. European militaries continued to provide condoms to their members for disease protection, even in countries where they were illegal for the general population.

=== Invention of spray-drying and manufacturing automation ===
Around 1920 patent lawyer, inventor and vice-president of the United States Rubber Company Ernest Hopkinson invented a simple new technique of converting latex into rubber without a coagulant (demulsifier), which featured using water as a solvent, spraying the solution and drying it with warm air, as well as optionally preserving liquid latex with ammonia. To distinguish from the earlier technologies, the rubber products made with this technology eventually started to be called "latex" products.

Youngs Rubber Company was the first to manufacture a latex condom, an improved version of their Trojan brand. Latex condoms required less labor to produce than cement-dipped rubber condoms, which had to be smoothed by rubbing and trimming. Because it used water to suspend the rubber instead of gasoline and benzene, it eliminated the fire hazard previously associated with all condom factories. Latex condoms also performed better for the consumer: they were stronger and thinner than rubber condoms, and had a shelf life of five years (compared to three months for rubber). Europe's first latex condom was an export from Youngs Rubber Company in 1929. In 1932 the London Rubber Company, which had previously served as a wholesaler for German-manufactured condoms, became Europe's first manufacturer of latex condoms, the Durex. The Durex plant was designed and installed by Lucian Landau, a Polish rubber technology student living in London.

Until the twenties, all condoms were individually hand-dipped by semiskilled workers. Throughout the 1920s, advances in automation of condom assembly line were made. Fred Killian patented the first fully automated line in 1930 and installed it in his manufacturing plant in Akron, Ohio. Killian charged $20,000 for his conveyor system ($390,000 in 2025 dollars). Automated lines dramatically lowered the price of condoms. Major condom manufacturers bought or leased conveyor systems, and small manufacturers were driven out of business. The skin condom, now significantly more expensive than the latex variety, became restricted to a niche high-end market. In Britain, the London Rubber Company's fully automated plant was designed in-house by Lucian Landau and the first lines were installed from 1950 onward.

=== Great Depression ===
In 1927, senior medical officers in the American military began promoting condom distribution and educational programs to members of the army and navy. By 1931, condoms were standard issue to all members of the U.S. military. This coincided with a steep decline in U.S. military cases of sexually transmitted infection. The U.S. military was not the only large organization that changed its moral stance on condoms: in 1930, the Anglican Church's Lambeth Conference sanctioned the use of birth control by married couples. In 1931, the Federal Council of Churches in the U.S. issued a similar statement.

The Roman Catholic Church responded by issuing the encyclical Casti connubii affirming its opposition to all contraceptives, a stance it has never reversed. Semen analysis was first performed in the 1930s. Samples were typically collected by masturbation, another action opposed by the Catholic Church. In 1930s Spain, the first use of collection condoms was documented; holes put in the condom allowed the user to collect a sample without violating the prohibitions on contraception and masturbation.

In 1932, Margaret Sanger arranged for a shipment of diaphragms to be mailed from Japan to a sympathetic doctor in New York City. When U.S. customs confiscated the package as illegal contraceptive devices, Sanger helped file a lawsuit. In 1936, a federal appeals court ruled in United States v. One Package of Japanese Pessaries that the federal government could not interfere with doctors providing contraception to their patients. In 1938, over three hundred birth control clinics opened in America, supplying reproductive care (including condoms) to poor women all over the country. Programs led by U.S. Surgeon General Thoman Parran included heavy promotion of condoms. These programs are credited with a steep drop in the U.S. STI rate by 1940.

Two of the few places where condoms became more restricted during this period were Fascist Italy and Nazi Germany. Because of government concern about low birth rates, contraceptives were made illegal in Italy in the late 1920s. Although limited and highly controlled sales as disease preventatives were still allowed, there was a brisk black market trade in condoms as birth control. In Germany, laws passed in 1933 mandated that condoms could only be sold in plain brown wrappers, and only at pharmacies. Despite these restrictions, when World War II began Germans were using 72 million condoms every year. The elimination of moral and legal barriers, and the introduction of condom programs by the U.S. government helped condom sales. However, these factors alone are not considered to explain the Great Depression's booming condom industry. In the U.S. alone, more than 1.5 million condoms were used every day during the Depression, at a cost of over $33 million per year (not adjusted for inflation). One historian explains these statistics this way: "Condoms were cheaper than children." During the Depression condom lines by Schmid gained in popularity: that company still used the cement-dipping method of manufacture. Unlike the latex variety, these condoms could be safely used with oil-based lubricants. And while less comfortable, older-style rubber condoms could be reused and so were more economical, a valued feature in hard times.

More attention was brought to quality issues in the 1930s. In 1935, a biochemist tested 2000 condoms by filling each one with air and then water: he found that 60% of them leaked. The condom industry estimated that only 25% of condoms were tested for quality before packaging. The media attention led the U.S. Food and Drug Administration to classify condoms as a drug in 1937 and mandate that every condom be tested before packaging. Youngs Rubber Company was the first to institute quality testing of every condom they made, installing automatic testing equipment designed by Arthur Youngs (the owner's brother) in 1938. The Federal Food, Drug, and Cosmetic Act authorized the FDA to seize defective products; the first month the Act took effect in 1940, the FDA seized 864,000 condoms. While these actions improved the quality of condoms in the United States, American condom manufacturers continued to export their rejects for sale in foreign markets.

=== World War II to 1980 ===
During World War II condoms were not only distributed to male U.S. military members, but enlisted men were also subject to significant contraception propaganda in the form of films, posters, and lectures. A number of slogans were coined by the military, with one film exhorting "Don't forget—put it on before you put it in." African-American soldiers, who served in segregated units, were exposed to less of the condom promotion programs, had lower rates of condom usage, and much higher rates of STIs. America's female military units, the WACs and WAACs, were still engaged with abstinence programs. European and Asian militaries on both sides of the conflict also provided condoms to their troops throughout the war, even Germany which outlawed all civilian use of condoms in 1941. Despite the rubber shortages that occurred during this period, condom manufacturing was never restricted. In part because condoms were readily available, soldiers found a number of non-sexual uses for the devices, many of which continue to be utilized to this day.

Post-war American troops in Germany continued to receive condoms and materials promoting their use. Nevertheless, rates of STIs in this population began to rise, reaching the highest levels since World War I. One explanation is that the success of newer penicillin treatments led soldiers to take syphilis and gonorrhea much less seriously. A similar casual attitude toward STIs appeared in the general American population; one historian states that condoms "were almost obsolete as prophylaxis by 1960". By 1947, the U.S. military was again promoting abstinence as the only method of disease control for its members, a policy that continued through the Vietnam War.

But condom sales continued to grow. From 1955 to 1965, 42% of Americans of reproductive age relied on condoms for birth control. In Britain from 1950 to 1960, 60% of married couples used condoms. For the more economical-minded, cement-dipped condoms continued to be available long after the war. In 1957, Durex introduced the world's first lubricated condom. Beginning in the 1960s, the Japanese used more condoms per capita than any other nation in the world. The birth control pill became the world's most popular method of birth control in the years after its 1960 debut, but condoms remained a strong second. A survey of British women between 1966 and 1970 found that the condom was the most popular birth control method with single women. New manufacturers appeared in the Soviet Union, which had never restricted condom sales. The U.S. Agency for International Development pushed condom use in developing countries to help solve the "world population crises": by 1970 hundreds of millions of condoms were being used each year in India alone.

In the 1960s and 1970s quality regulations tightened, and legal barriers to condom use were removed. In 1965, the U.S. Supreme Court case Griswold v. Connecticut struck down one of the remaining Comstock laws, the bans of contraception in Connecticut and Massachusetts. France repealed its anti-birth control laws in 1967. Similar laws in Italy were declared unconstitutional in 1971. Captain Beate Uhse in Germany founded a birth control business, and fought a series of legal battles to continue her sales. In Ireland, legal condom sales (only to people over 18, and only in clinics and pharmacies) were allowed for the first time in 1978. (All restrictions on Irish condom sales were lifted in 1993.)

Advertising was one area that continued to have legal restrictions. In the late 1950s, the American National Association of Broadcasters banned condom advertisements from national television. This policy remained in place until 1979, when the U.S. Justice department had it overturned in court. In the U.S., advertisements for condoms were mostly limited to men's magazines such as Penthouse. The first television ad, on the California station KNTV, aired in 1975: it was quickly pulled after it attracted national attention. And in over 30 states, advertising condoms as birth control devices was still illegal.

=== After the discovery of AIDS ===
The first New York Times story on acquired immunodeficiency syndrome (AIDS) was published on July 3, 1981. In 1982, it was first suggested that the disease was sexually transmitted. In response to these findings, and to fight the spread of AIDS, the U.S. Surgeon General Dr. C. Everett Koop supported condom promotion programs. However, President Ronald Reagan preferred an approach of concentrating only on abstinence programs. Some opponents of condom programs stated that AIDS was a disease of homosexuals and illicit drug users, who were just getting what they deserved. In 1990, North Carolina senator Jesse Helms argued that the best way to fight AIDS would be to enforce state sodomy laws.

Nevertheless, major advertising campaigns were put in print media, promoting condoms as a way to protect against AIDS. Youngs Rubber mailed educational pamphlets to American households, although the postal service forced them to go to court to do so, citing a section of Title 39 that "prohibits the mailing of unsolicited advertisements for contraceptives." In 1983 the U.S. Supreme Court held that the postal service's actions violated the free speech clause of the First Amendment. Beginning in 1985 through 1987, national condom promotion campaigns occurred in U.S. and Europe. Over the 10 years of the Swiss campaign, Swiss condom use increased by 80%. The year after the British campaign began, condom sales in the UK increased by 20%. In 1988 Britain, condoms were the most popular birth control choice for married couples, for the first time since the introduction of the pill. The first condom commercial on U.S. television aired during an episode of Herman's Head on November 17, 1991. In the U.S. in the 1990s, condoms ranked third in popularity among married couples, and were a strong second among single women.

Condoms began to be sold in a wider variety of retail outlets, including in supermarkets and in discount department stores such as Wal-Mart. In this environment of more open sales, the British euphemism of "a little something for the weekend" fell out of use. In June 1991 America's first condom store, Condomania, opened on Bleecker Street in New York City. Condomania was also one of the first retailers to offer condoms online when it launched its website in December 1995.

Condom sales increased every year until 1994, when media attention to the AIDS pandemic began to decline. In response, manufacturers have changed the tone of their advertisements from scary to humorous. New developments continue to occur in the condom market, with the first polyurethane condom—branded Avanti and produced by the manufacturer of Durex—introduced in the 1990s. Durex was also the first condom brand to have a website, launched in 1997. As of 2007, worldwide condom use was expected to continue to grow: one study predicted that developing nations would need 18.6 billion condoms in 2015.

In 1987, Global Protection Corp. was founded in Boston, Massachusetts, by two Tufts University students, and it became known for its innovative approach to condom marketing. It developed the only FDA-approved glow-in-the-dark condom, called the Pleasure Plus condom. In 2005 the company introduced its ONE Condoms product line. The One brand used sleek metal packaging, unusual condom wrappers and innovative marketing programs. In 2014, Global Protection became majority owned by Karex, which then purchased the rest of the company in 2020. In 2022, ONE Condoms and MyONE Condoms became the first to receive FDA approval specifically for anal sex.

== Etymology and other terms ==
Etymological theories for the word "condom" abound. By the early 18th century, the invention and naming of the condom was attributed to an associate of England's King Charles II, and this explanation persisted for several centuries. However, the "Dr. Condom" or "Earl of Condom" described in these stories has never been proved to exist, and condoms had been used for over one hundred years before King Charles II acceded to the throne. The word condom also has nothing to do with the South American explorations of Charles Marie de La Condamine, who was the first to introduce latex to the scientific public in Europe.

A variety of Latin etymologies have been proposed, including condon (receptacle), condamina (house), and cumdum (scabbard or case). It has also been speculated to be from the Italian word guantone, derived from guanto, meaning glove. William E. Kruck wrote an article in 1981 concluding that, "As for the word 'condom', I need state only that its origin remains completely unknown, and there ends this search for an etymology." Modern dictionaries may also list the etymology as "unknown".

Other terms are also commonly used to describe condoms. In North America condoms are also commonly known as prophylactics, or rubbers. In Britain they may be called French letters. Additionally, condoms may be referred to using the manufacturer's name. The insult term scumbag was originally a slang word for condom.

== Major manufacturers ==
One analyst described the size of the condom market as something that "boggles the mind". Numerous small manufacturers, nonprofit groups, and government-run manufacturing plants exist around the world. Within the condom market, there are several major contributors, among them both for-profit businesses and philanthropic organizations.

In 1882, German immigrant Julius Schmid founded one of the largest and longest-lasting condom businesses, Julius Schmid, Inc., based in New York City. The condom lines manufactured by Schmid included Sheiks and Ramses. In 1932, the London Rubber Company (which had previously been a wholesale business importing German condoms) began to produce latex condoms, under the Durex brand. In 1963 Schmid was purchased by London Rubber. In 1987, London Rubber began acquiring other condom manufacturers, and within a few years became an important international company. In the late 1990s, London Rubber (by then London International Limited) merged all the Schmid brands into its European brand, Durex. Soon after, London International was purchased by Seton Scholl Healthcare (manufacturer of Dr. Scholl's footcare products), forming Seton Scholl Limited.

Youngs Rubber Company, founded by Merle Youngs in late-19th-century America, introduced the Trojan line of condoms. In 1985, Youngs Rubber Company was sold to Carter-Wallace. The Trojan name switched hands yet again in 2000 when Carter-Wallace was sold to Church and Dwight.

The Australian division of Dunlop Rubber began manufacturing condoms in the 1890s. In 1905, Dunlop sold its condom-making equipment to one of its employees, Eric Ansell, who founded Ansell. In 1969, Ansell was sold back to Dunlop. In 1987, English business magnate Richard Branson contracted with Ansell to help in a campaign against HIV and AIDS. Ansell agreed to manufacture the Mates brand of condom, to be sold at little or no profit in order to encourage condom use. Branson soon sold the Mates brand to Ansell, with royalty payments made annually to the charity Virgin Unite. In addition to its Mates brand, Ansell currently manufactures Lifestyles and Lifesan for the U.S. market.

In 1934 the Kokusia Rubber Company was founded in Japan. It is now known as the Okamoto Rubber Manufacturing Company.

In 1970 Tim Black and Phil Harvey founded Population Planning Associates (now known as Adam & Eve). Population Planning Associates was a mail-order business that marketed condoms to American college students, despite U.S. laws against sending contraceptives through the mail. Black and Harvey used the profits from their company to start a non-profit organization Population Services International. By 1975, PSI was marketing condoms in Kenya and Bangladesh, and today operates programs in over sixty countries. Harvey left his position as PSI's director in the late 1970s, but in the late 1980s again founded a nonprofit company, DKT International. Named after D.K. Tyagi (a leader of family planning programs in India), DKT International annually sells millions of condoms at discounted rates in developing countries around the world. By selling the condoms instead of giving them away, DKT intends to make its customers invested in using the devices. One of DKT's more notable programs is its work in Ethiopia, where soldiers are required to carry a condom every time they leave base. The rate of HIV infection in the Ethiopian military, about 5%, is believed to be the lowest among African militaries.

As of 2020, the Malaysian company Karex is the largest condom producer in the world.
