= Effect of World War I on children in the United States =

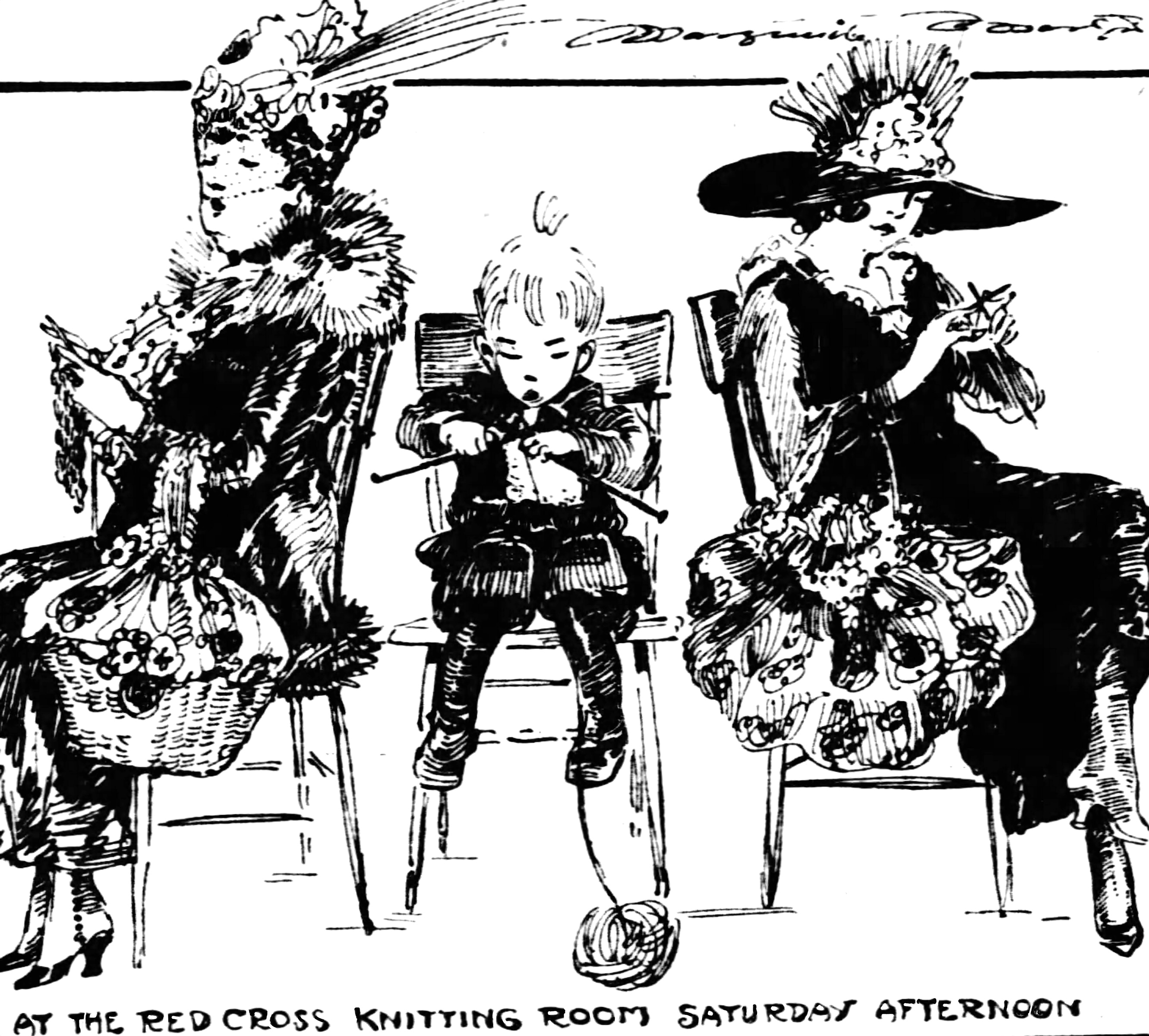
Drawing by Marguerite Martyn of two women and a child knitting for the war effort at a St. Louis, Missouri, Red Cross office in 1917

Though the United States was in combat for only a year and 7 months, the reorganization of society had a great effect on life for children in the United States. More than 116,000 members of the U.S. military died in the war, far fewer than combatants from other countries. No one has estimated how many orphans resulted. Additionally, as the male workforce left for battle, mothers and sisters began working in factories to take their positions, and the family dynamic began to change; this affected children as they had less time to spend with family members and were expected to grow up faster and help with the war effort. Similarly, Woodrow Wilson called on children involved in youth organizations to help collect money for war bonds and stamps in order to raise money for the war effort. This was a way to mobilize public opinion and shame adults who did not donate. The Office of War Information and other agencies implemented programs and created posters and pamphlets to encourage war support.

== Background of World War I ==
The United States was involved in World War I for the last 19 months of the war (April 1917 to November 1918), 4,355,000 men were conscripted into service. By summer 1918, they were trained and shipped to France at the rate of 10,000 military personnel a day.

Meanwhile, every farm, town and city, and every economic sector, was mobilized for the war effort. Tens of millions of parents took war jobs or joined voluntary organizations such as the Red Cross. This involvement changed the course of the war and directly affected children's daily life, education, and family structures in the United States. The home front saw a systematic mobilization of the entire population and the entire economy to produce the soldiers, food supplies, munitions, and money needed to win the war. Although the United States entered the war in 1917, there had been very little planning or recognition of the British and other Allies' problems on their homefronts. As a result, the level of confusion was high in the first 12 months, then efficiency took control.

=== Home life ===
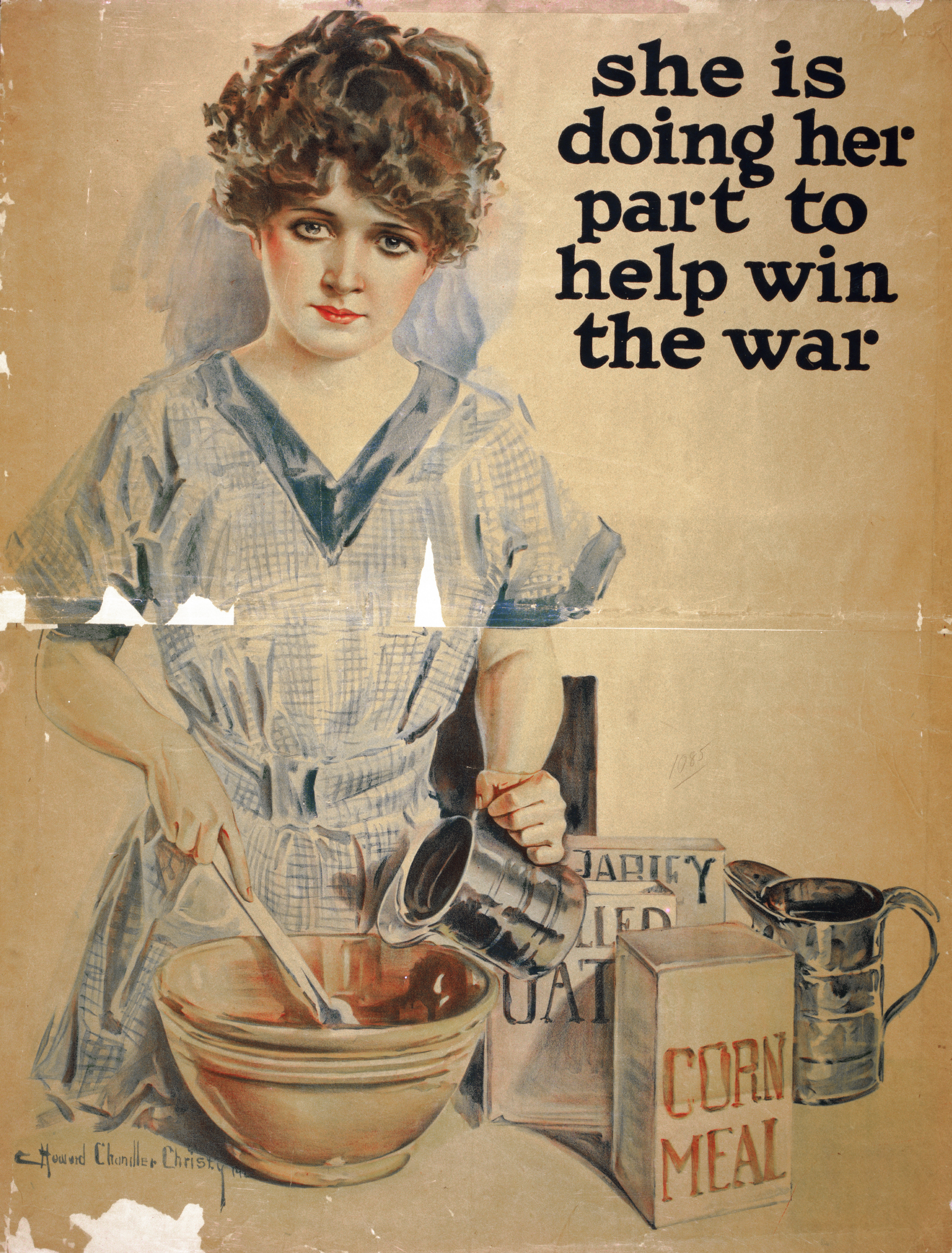
Girls too young for paid jobs learned how they could help the war effort.

Over 21 million people were killed or injured in World War I; in many cases, all of the men in one family were killed, numerous cities in Europe were destroyed, and family life throughout the world was greatly affected. As the war draft suddenly removed many men from factory work, the factories began soliciting for women workers in traditionally male-dominated areas. Therefore, women had less time to spend at home with the children, as many of them would have before the war. Additionally, women moving into new roles in society had lasting effects on children and family life after the war. President Woodrow Wilson stated, "We have made partners of the women in this war; shall we admit them only to a partnership of suffering and sacrifice and toil and not to a partnership of privilege and right?" As women began working, more of society began to realize the need for women's rights; while women had been granted suffrage (voting rights) to varying degrees in several states beginning in the late 19th century, they were now guaranteed full suffrage throughout the United States by the Nineteenth Amendment to the United States Constitution passed in August, 1920. This also paved the way for the children of future generations by creating greater career opportunities for girls and women; as women gained a stronger voice, girls became more involved in the workforce and education and prepared for roles outside of the home.

Over the course of the war, the United States mobilized hundreds of thousands of men and endured an estimated 117,465 casualties. Of the men who survived and returned home, post-traumatic stress disorder created a major impact on society. During this time, and still today, post-traumatic stress (then more likely to be known as "shell shock") was not fully understood, but because of the traumatic nature of battle, many men were negatively affected after the war. Some men were forced to leave battle, which many people considered cowardice, and there were asylums throughout Europe housing men suffering from this condition. In some extreme cases, men were even shot for showing weakness. There are still people living today who lost family members because of this practice, which created lasting impacts on these children. Additionally, many of these men were teenagers when they left for war, and virtually all were under the age of 30; therefore many of these soldiers were barely out of childhood themselves.

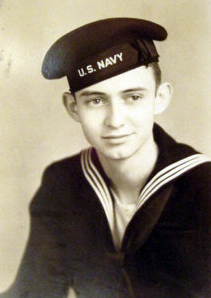
This is a young American man enlisted in the U.S. Navy during World War I.

Furthermore, because over a million young men were deployed overseas, marriage and childbearing had to be postponed.

=== Technology ===
On the home front, domestic appliances were being created, alleviating the amount of time that women needed to spend on chores, so they had more time to work outside of the home. Additionally, this lessened the need for female servants, as things like laundry services and food preparation services became popular. Therefore, women were able to move into more traditionally male-dominated areas, as technology began to do the service jobs that women primarily were responsible for. Additionally, this showed young girls that they could eventually work outside of the home and more opportunities were available to them after they completed their education.

== Education ==
Even though the United States was only involved in World War I for a short period of time, the government created several programs to help support education such as the Committee of Public Information (CPI), the National Education Association (NEA), and the Cardinal Principles of Secondary Education, all of which promoted nationalist movements and changes to education. Woodrow Wilson and the United States government, through these programs, funded a series of pamphlets, posters, bulletins, and speeches, which promoted strong nationalism and anti-German sentiments. These pamphlets also focused on a new movement of social efficacy, which strongly favored students growing as people and becoming involved, patriotic citizens. Another main goal of these educational programs was a move away from state education systems and toward a nationalized system of education, which would keep curriculums similar and promote a unified nation among students. For example, the national government changed textbooks to portray the American Revolution in a way that did not make Britain appear malevolent. This was important because the United States allied with Great Britain. These programs also promoted things like volunteering with federal organizations such as the Reserve Officers' Training Corps (ROTC) and buying war bonds to support the government.

Starting as early as the elementary level, patriotic and pro-war lessons were instituted in public schools. They included things such as weekly fifteen-minute periods on patriotism for the first and second grades. They stressed that teachers instruct the children so that they viewed the war in a positive manner and portrayed war in terms of celebrations and victories, not destructive realities. An elementary pamphlet stated,

In teaching the war to young pupils, the appeal should be directed primarily to the imagination and to the emotions. It is not enough that our pupils shall be informed of the events of the war...Their imaginations must be awakened and their feelings aroused to an appreciation of the significance of the great happenings of the times.

Therefore, starting at a very early level, students were taught that the war was a good thing and about the importance of patriotism.

Patriotic sentiments were also carried out in secondary settings. Specific programs and in-school curricula targeted the patriotic development of children, especially teens. New history curricula introduced rewrote the story of the American past to de-emphasize the friction between the colonies and Britain, and to deconstruct historical American and German amity in order to vilify the Germans. For example, every senior in high school received their own pamphlet in January 1918 called "Study of the Great War." This attempted to encourage enmity for Germany and emphasized the importance of an Allied victory.

Things like the importance of the ROTC program were also stressed during this time. Nationalist posters and other forms of propaganda were placed in public areas throughout the country that showed the importance of patriotism. Posters, like the Boy Scout poster shown below, depicted teenagers contributing to the war effort as being courageous and admired. This form of propaganda was especially influential on teenagers because most of them were trying to figure out their roles in society and desired to fit in; therefore, posters showing their peers serving their country and receiving recognition and respect, were particularly influential in persuading teenagers to join the war effort in whatever way they could.

=== Post-war ===
After the war ended, nationalist movements changed to a larger focus on international peace. There were strong government movements toward peace and anti-war sentiments and the need to avoid further wars. Additionally, there was a focus on internationalization of higher education. For example, in 1920, the Belgian American Educational Foundation instituted a program with over 700 students, in which American students went to study in Belgium and vice versa in order to promote international understanding.

== Youth organizations ==
=== Boy ===
Due to the large nationalist movement during World War I, many youth organizations were developed or expanded, including the Boy Scouts of America. During World War I, Woodrow Wilson placed a great importance on the Boy Scouts of America, asking them to encourage war support and educate public sources about the importance of the war. They helped distribute war pamphlets, sell war bonds, and drive nationalism and support for the war. Additionally, they were involved in many activities that helped the national government, such as locating black walnuts to use in war materials and peach pits for gas masks. The Boy Scouts were involved in five Liberty Bond drives in which they helped sell Liberty Bonds to benefit the U.S. government. During the first campaign, they raised a total of $23,000,000. For the third campaign, known as the "Wake Up, America" rally, beginning on April 27, 1918, 400,000 Boy Scouts embarked on a door to window program selling Liberty Bonds as well as war stamps. At the end of the five campaigns, the Boy Scouts raised $354,859,262 in bond subscriptions and $43,043,698 in war stamps. When a Boy Scout sold a bond or stamp, he would record the sale and send in a post card to his local post office, which would then forward it to the bonds and stamps. The Boy Scout would receive an "Ace Medal".

=== Camp Fire Girl ===
During World War I Camp Fire Girls helped to sell over one million dollars in Liberty Bonds and over $900,000 in Thrift Stamps; 55,000 girls helped to support French and Belgian orphans, and an estimated 68,000 girls earned honors by conservation of food.

== Aftermath ==
After the conclusion of World War I, the United States and the rest of the world changed. Those who were children during World War I grew up to become the adults of World War II. These children were exposed to propaganda and indoctrinated to value strong nationalism and loyalty to the United States and its allies. Therefore, when World War II was on the forefront, many of the adults in the United States still harbored negative feelings toward the Germans because of their schooling during World War I.

Additionally, women were granted suffrage shortly after World War I. This was partly due to the fact that they had moved away from their traditional roles and filled the factory jobs that the men were forced to leave in order to serve in World War I. Women showed their importance in society, which fueled many women's rights movements post–World War I. The girls who were in school during World War I were also learning about the importance of nationalism, and saw their mothers fulfilling traditionally male-dominated roles. This desire for nationalism and exposure to wider opportunities helped to enable these girls to grow up and become involved in securing rights for themselves.

== See also ==
- History of childhood in the United States
- Shell shock
- History of condoms § World War I to the 1920s
- Birth control movement in the United States
- 1918 flu pandemic

== Sources and further reading ==
- Adams, Simon. Eyewitness World War I. London: DK Publishing, Inc., 2001. ISBN 978-0-7566-3007-2.
- Breen, William J. Uncle Sam at Home: Civilian Mobilization, Wartime Federalism, and the Council of National Defense, 1917-1919 (Greenwood, 1984)
- Cohen, Debra Rae. Remapping the Home Front. Boston: Northeastern University Press, 2002. ISBN 1-55553-533-X (hardcover).
- Fromkin, David. In the Time of the Americans: FDR, Truman, Eisenhower, Marshall, MacArthur – The Generation That Changed America's Role in the World. New York: Aldred A. Knopf, Inc., 1995. ISBN 0-394-58901-7.
- Greenwald, Maurine Weiner. Women, War, and Work: the Impact of World War I on Women Workers in the United States. Ithaca: Cornell UP, 1990. ISBN 0-8014-9733-7.
- Kennedy, David M. Over Here: The First World War and American Society (2004), is the standard scholarly history
- Mackaman, Douglas Peter., and Michael Mays. World War I and the Cultures of Modernity. Jackson, MS: University of Mississippi, 2000. ISBN 1-57806-243-8.
- McDermott, T. P. SOSSI Journal: USA's Boy Scouts and World War I Liberty Loan Bonds. Accessed 22 March 2010.
- Spring, Joel. Images of American Life. Albany: State University of New York Press, 1992. ISBN 0-7914-1069-2.
- Snowman, McCowan, and Biehler. "Psychology Applied to Teaching." United States of America: Cengage Learning, 2009. ISBN 978-1-4240-8070-0.
- Wit, Hans De. Internationalization of Higher Education in the United States of America and Europe: a Historical, Comparative, and Conceptual Analysis. Westport, Conn.: Greenwood, 2002. ISBN 978-1-60752-066-5.
- "Wilson Makes Suffrage Appeal, But Senate Waits". The New York Times. October 1, 1918. p. 1.

=== Books for elementary school children ===
- Dowswell, Paul. True Stories of the First World War. U.S.A.: First Scholastic Printing, February 2007. ISBN 978-0-439-93237-0.
