= Safedom =

Chinese condom manufacturer

Safedom Technology Corporation
- Founded: Beijing, 2006
- Headquarters: Beijing, China
- Key people: Qiang (Brian) Fu (CEO)
- Revenue: $22M (2010)

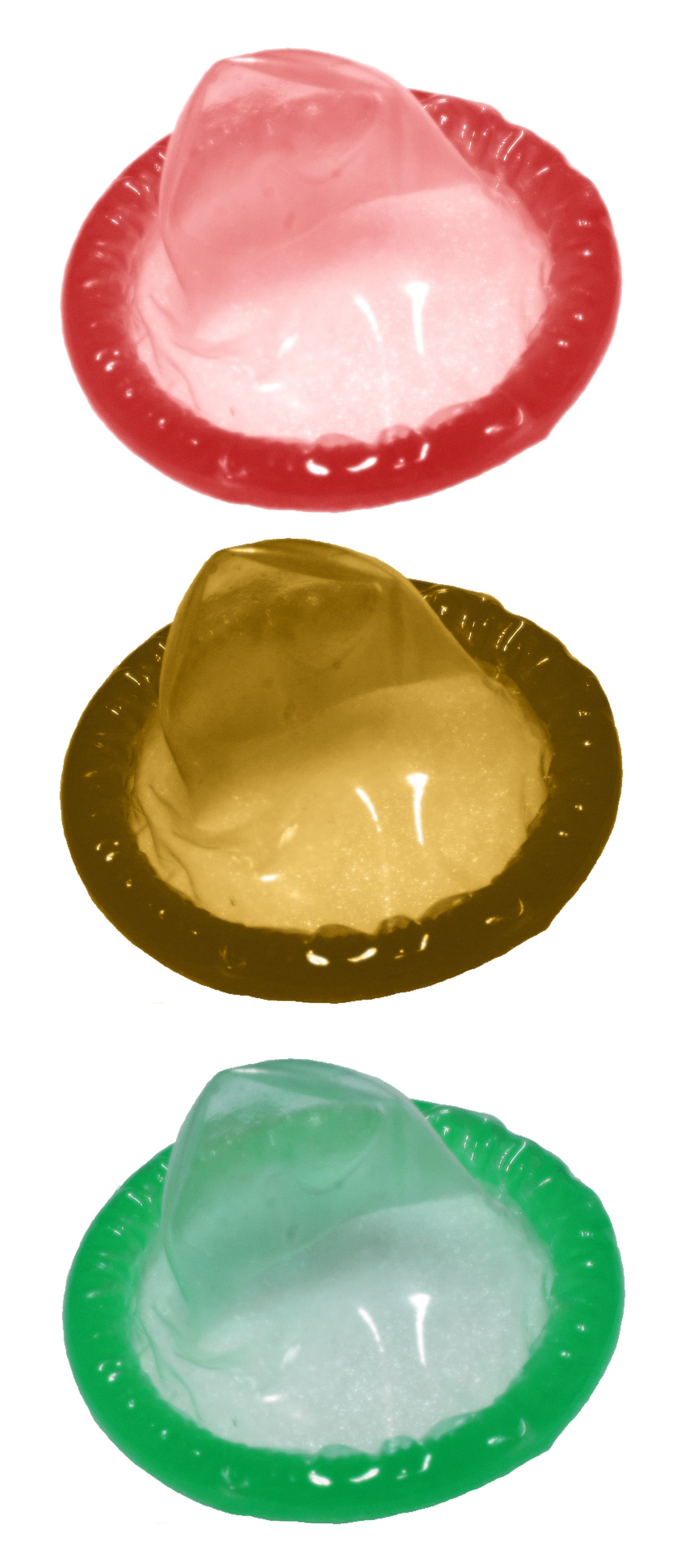
added image

Safedom is a Chinese condom manufacturer based in Beijing. Founded in 2006, it grew rapidly in China and was planning to sell 1 billion condoms in China in 2012, approximately 8% of the domestic market. Four-fifths of Safedom's customers in China are women, since its marketing emphasises female health benefits.

The company claimed to produce the first virus-proof condom.

Safedom competes with Durex and other condom-makers in Europe and elsewhere.
