= Scum =

Scum or S.C.U.M. may refer to:

== Scum ==
- Soap scum, an informal term for the white solid that results from the addition of soap to hard water
- Impurity that accumulates at the surface of a liquid (especially water or molten metal)
- Dross, solid impurities floating on a molten metal
- Algae or similar vegetation found floating on the surfaces of ponds
- The topmost liquid layer in a septic tank, mainly consisting of fats

== Games and sport ==
- Scum (video game), a 2025 open-world survival video game
- Scum (card game), a card game in which players race to get rid of all of the cards in their hands
- S.C.U.M. (professional wrestling), a professional wrestling stable
- "Scum" or "scummers", a derogatory nickname for English football club Southampton F.C., used by supporters of rivals Portsmouth

== Books, film and TV ==
- Scum, a 1991 novel by Isaac Bashevis Singer translated from the Yiddish by Rosaline Dukalsky Schwartz
- "The Scum", a derogatory nickname for British tabloid The Sun
- Scum, a script by Roy Minton
  - Scum (television play), a 1977 television version directed by Alan Clark with Ray Winstone in a lead role
  - Scum (film), a 1979 British feature film version directed by Clark and with Winstone
- SCUM Manifesto, a 1967 book by Valerie Solanas

== Music ==
=== Bands ===
- Scum (band), a Norwegian hardcore punk/black metal band
- S.C.U.M (band), an English post-punk/art rock group
- SCUM, a side project of Japanese noise musician Merzbow

=== Albums ===
- Scum (Anti-Nowhere League album), 1997
- Scum (Napalm Death album), 1987
- Scum (Rat Boy album), 2017
- Scums (album), by Nightmare, 2013

=== Songs ===
- "Scum", by Depeche Mode from Spirit, 2017
- "Scum", by Goat Girl, 2016
- "Scum", by Meat Puppets from No Joke!, 1995
- "Scum", by Nick Cave and the Bad Seeds from Your Funeral... My Trial, 1986
- "Scum", by Oi Polloi from Unite and Win, 1987
- "Scum", by Lovejoy from Wake Up & It's Over, 2023

== Acronyms ==
- SCUMM (Script Creation Utility for Maniac Mansion), scripting language for development of the graphical adventure game Maniac Mansion
- SCUM Manifesto, a 1967 radical feminist manifesto wherein SCUM means "Society for Cutting Up Men"
- Project SCUM, a cigarette marketing initiative
- S.C.U.M. ("Saboteurs and Criminals United in Mayhem"), the criminal organisation from the animated series; James Bond Jr.

== See also ==
- Scum Lake (disambiguation)
- Scum of the Earth (disambiguation)
- Skum (disambiguation)
- Scump or Seth Abner (born 1995), professional Call of Duty player
- Scrum (disambiguation)
