= Skum =

Skum may refer to:

== Music ==
- Skum Rocks!, a 2013 film about a 1980s band named Skum
- Skum, a 1970 orchestral composition by Hans Abrahamsen
- SKuM, a 2009 album by Abrasive Wheels
- "Skum", a song by Non Phixion, from their 2004 album The Green CD/DVD

== Other uses ==
- Skum (Dungeons & Dragons), a Dungeons & Dragons monster
- Shahrekord University of Medical Sciences, an Iranian medical school commonly abbreviated as SKUMS
- Sigma Kappa Upsilon Mu, a social fraternity

== See also ==
- Scum (disambiguation)
