= Scumbag =

Scumbag may refer to:

- A dysphemism for a base, despicable person; also a term of vulgar abuse
- A condom, coarse slang (chiefly U.S.)

Scumbag may also refer to:

- Scumbag (film), 2017 black comedy film by filmmaker Mars Roberge
- "Scumbag" (song), a 2019 song by Goody Grace
- "Scumbag", a song by John Lennon and Yoko Ono from Some Time in New York City
- "Scumbag", a song by Green Day from Shenanigans

== See also ==
- Scumbag Hustler, film by Sean Weathers
- My Self Scumbag, biographical novel based on Ivan Scumbag life
- Scumbag Steve, Internet meme that became popular in 2006
- Scumbug, mutant cockroach
- Scuba (disambiguation)
- Scum (disambiguation)
- Sumba
