= Dr. Scholl's =

Footwear and foot care brand

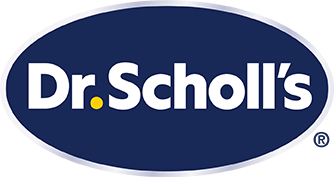
- Product type: Foot Care Products
- Current owner: Scholl’s Wellness Company LLC
- Country: Chicago, United States
- Introduced: 1906; 120 years ago
- Markets: United States and Canada
- Previous owners: Bayer; Schering-Plough (Merck); SSL International (Reckitt)
- Website: www.drscholls.com

Dr. Scholl's is a footwear and orthopedic foot care brand originating in the United States, marketed in some countries as simply "Scholl". Since 2021, global rights to the brand have been owned by investment firm Yellow Wood Partners through subsidiary Scholl's Wellness Company, having purchased the North American rights from Bayer in North America in 2019, and the international rights from Reckitt in 2021.

== History ==
Podiatrist William Mathias Scholl started the brand in 1906. He is credited with designing over 1,000 foot care products. Scholl's company was named to the Fortune 500 in 1971, the same year it went public.

=== Dr. Scholl's brand ===
Schering-Plough bought the Dr. Scholl's brand in 1979. In 2009, Merck & Co. purchased the Dr. Scholl's brand as part of its acquisition of Schering-Plough. Under Merck & Co., Schering-Plough imported the product line from China and had a North American distribution agreement for footwear with the Brown Shoe Company (now Caleres). Bayer bought Dr. Scholl's in 2014 as part of its acquisition of Merck & Co's consumer health unit. This acquisition gave them the rights to the business in North and South America.

In July 2019, Bayer sold Dr. Scholl's to Yellow Wood Partners for $585 million. Yellow Wood established a new company, Scholl's Wellness Company to run the brand.

=== Scholl brand ===
In 1984, Schering-Plough sold the global brand and non-North American operations to European Home Products (later SSL International), who manufactured and distributed footwear and foot care products under the Scholl brand.

In 2010, Reckitt Benckiser Group purchased the Scholl brand from SSL International. In 2014, Aurelius, a German private equity firm, purchased the international rights to Scholl Footwear from Reckitt Benckiser, excluding the Americas.

In June 2021, Reckitt sold Scholl, including the Amope brand, to Yellow Wood Partners, bringing both the Scholl and Dr. Scholl's businesses together for the first time in over 40 years.

== Gallery ==
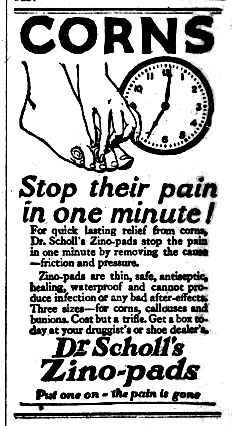
1923 newspaper ad for Dr Scholl's Zino-pads for corns

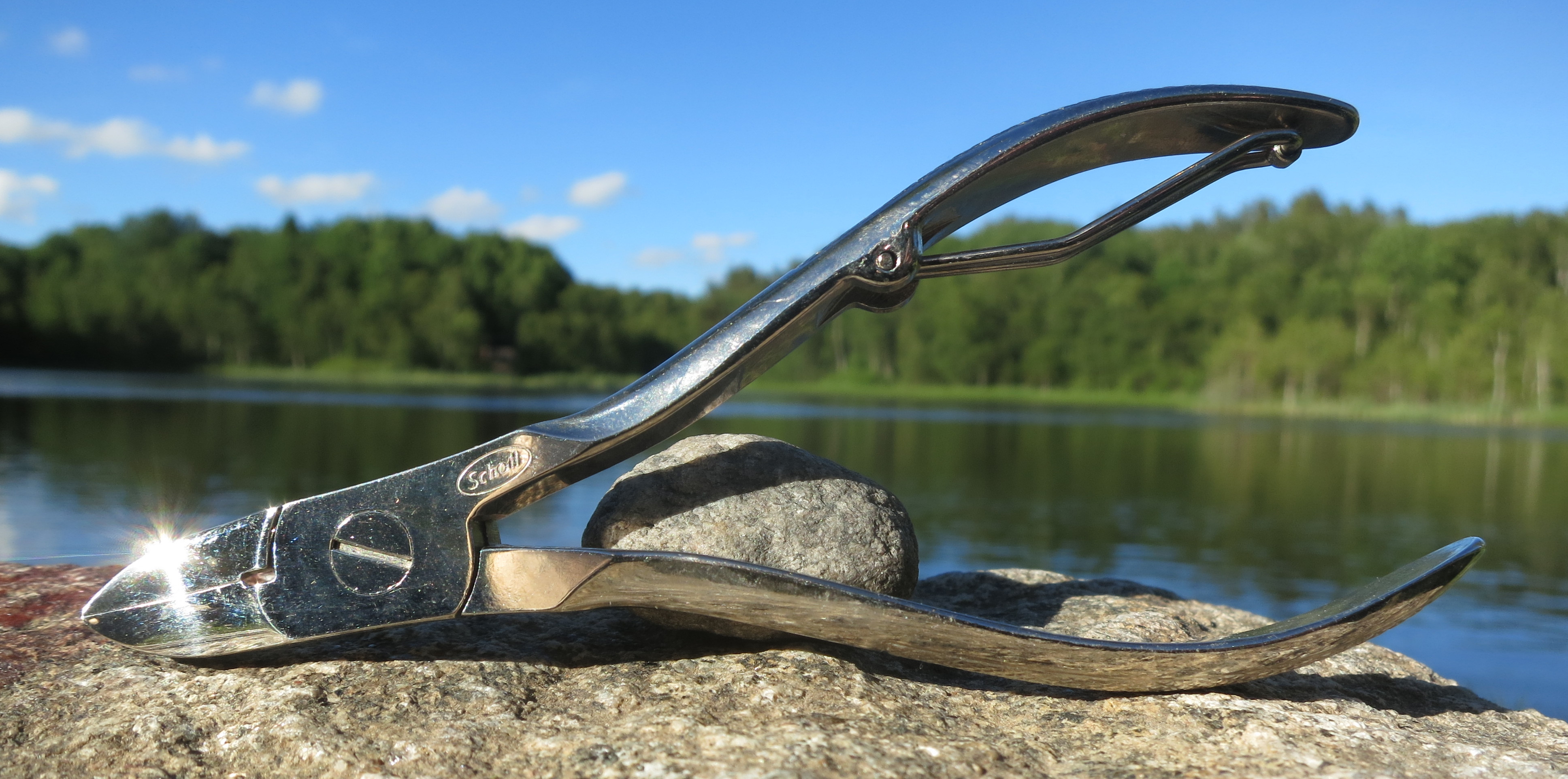
Late-20th-century spring-loaded toenail nipper by Dr. Scholl's
