= Gerhard Graf-Martinez =

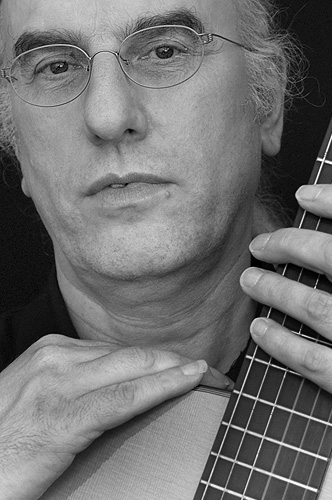
Gerhard Graf-Martinez

Gerhard Graf-Martinez (born 1952 in Schorndorf, Baden-Württemberg) is a German Flamenco guitarist, author and composer. In 1982, he founded the Flamenco-Jazz trio “Modo Nuevo”. Being a member of the “Peña Flamenca Sierra Blanca Marbella”, he hosted the “Curso Internacional De La Guitarra Flamenca” in Marbella (Málaga) between 1984 and 1987. From 1987 to 1989, he performed as a duo together with a Jewish singer. Between 1989 and 1996, Graf-Martinez was regularly invited as docent to numerous international guitar seminars. He established “Guitar Days” in his home town, which he led until 1994. During 1989 and 1996, he was touring throughout Europe together with his wife, the flamenco dancer Lela de Fuenteprado. After that, Graf-Martinez worked more and more as an author. Since then he has worldwide published more than eight books - educational books with CDs, CD-ROM an DVDs - in English and in German.

In 2005 Gerhard Graf-Martinez was awarded the EduMedia-Award and the Comenius medal for his DVDs Flamenco Guitar. The DVD “Gipsy Guitar - Rumbas Flamencas“ is nominated for the “digita 2009“, a quality award for digital media education.

Led by the passion to the Flamenco Graf-Martinez developed a special metronome software for the Flamenco rhythms.

== Publications ==
- Flamenco Guitar Method Vol. 1 (CD-Audio) - ISMN: 979-0-001-13109-4
- Flamenco Guitar Method Vol. 1 - Value Pack, NTSC (Book + DVD + CD-Audio) - ISMN: 979-0-001-13920-5
- Flamenco Guitar Method Vol. 2 - ISMN: 979-0-001-13110-0
- Flamenco Guitar Method Vol. 2 - Value Pack, NTSC (Book + DVD) - ISMN: 979-0-001-13922-9
- Flamenco-Gitarrenschule Vol. 1 (CD-Audio) - ISMN: 979-0-001-08422-2
- Flamenco-Gitarrenschule Vol. 2 - ISMN: 979-0-001-08423-9
- Gipsy Guitar - Rumbas flamencas y mas (Play-Along-Album - Book with 2 Audio-CDs) - ISMN: 3-7957-5509-3
- Gipsy Guitar - Rumbas flamencas y mas (CD-ROM) - ISBN 978-3-7957-6077-9 (EOL)
- DVD - Flamenco-Gitarrenschule Vol 1 (de/en PAL) - ISBN 3-7957-6097-6
- Flamenco-Gitarrenschule Vol 1, Value Pack, Book + DVD + CD-Audio (de/en PAL) - ISMN: 979-0-001-13917-5
- DVD - Flamenco-Gitarrenschule Vol 2 (de/en PAL) - ISBN 3-7957-6098-4
- Flamenco-Gitarrenschule Vol 2, Value Pack, Book + DVD (de/en PAL) - ISMN: 979-0-001-13918-2
- DVD - Flamenco Guitar Method Vol 1 (en NTSC) - ISBN 978-3-7957-6039-7
- DVD - Flamenco Guitar Method Vol 2 (en NTSC) - ISBN 978-3-7957-6040-3
- DVD Gipsy Guitar Rumbas flamencas (2008) - ISBN 978-3-7957-7609-1
- Flamenco Metronome Graf-Martinez - Software für Mac/Win
- Flametro - iOs metronome app
- FlamencoPercusión for Logic Pro, GarageBand and Cubase
- FlamencoPercusión for GarageBand iPad/iPhone
- Sheet Music Book (Print) - Flamenco Guitar Technics Vol. 1: Arpegios - Rasgueados - ISMN 979-0-9000067-0-7 - Deutsch | Español | English
- Sheet Music Book (Print) - Flamenco Guitar Technics Vol. 2: Picados - Escalas - Ligados - ISMN 979-0-9000067-1-4 - Deutsch | Español | English
- Sheet Music Book (Print) - Flamenco Guitar Technics Vol. 3: Acordes - Cadencias - ISMN 979-0-9000067-2-1 - Deutsch | Español | English
- iBook (ePub) - Flamenco Guitar Technics Vol. 1: Arpegios - Rasgueados - Deutsch | Español | English
- iBook (ePub) - Flamenco Guitar Technics Vol. 2: Picados - Escalas - Ligados - Deutsch | Español | English
- iBook (ePub) - Flamenco Guitar Technics Vol. 3: Acordes - Cadencias - Deutsch | Español | English

== Discography ==
- Modo Nuevo - Flamenco Latino - Boulevard Records 1987
- Fingerprints - Acoustic Guitar Sampler K&M 1989
- Monographie Vol. 6 Ethno Music - New Sounds Monza (Italy)
- Monographie Vol. 11 Flamenco - New Sounds Monza (Italy)
- Oase der Harmonie und Entspannung - Bell Records
- Guitarrissimo - Boulevard Records
- Schools for Nepal - Consonar 2005

== See also ==
- New Flamenco
