= Edmond Haan =

French footballer (1924–2018)

Personal information
- Date of birth: 25 May 1924
- Place of birth: Schorndorf, Germany
- Date of death: 15 August 2018 (aged 94)
- Position: Forward

Youth career
- ASPV Strasbourg

Senior career*
Years	Team	Apps	(Gls)
1947–1961	Strasbourg		
1949–1950	→ Nîmes (loan)		

International career
1951–1953	France	4	(0)
- * Club domestic league appearances and goals

Edmond Haan (25 May 1924 – 15 August 2018) was a French footballer who played es a forward.
