= Scum Lake =

Scum Lake may refer to one of two lakes in Canada:

- Scum Lake (British Columbia), a lake in Chilcotin District, British Columbia
- Scum Lake (Ontario), a lake in Thunder Bay District, Ontario
