= Julius Schmid (manufacturer) =

Germany born manufacturer in America (1865–1939)

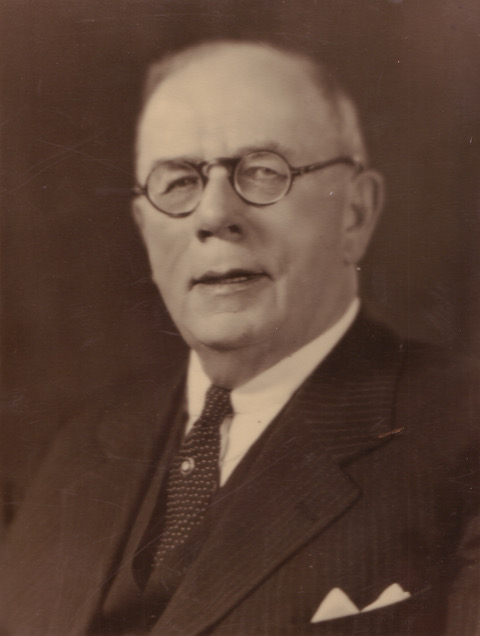
- Born: Karl Julius Schmid; March 17, 1865; Schorndorf, Kingdom of Württemberg, Germany
- Died: June 6, 1939 (aged 74); Beverly Hills, California, U.S.
- Occupation: Entrepreneur
- Known for: Pioneer of condom manufacturing
- Spouse: Elisabeth Shmid
- Children: 2

Julius Schmid (March 17, 1865 – June 6, 1939) was an American entrepreneur who was a pioneer of condom manufacturing. Ramses was one of his major condom brands. His enterprise was initially hampered because his contraceptive business was illegal in the early 20th-century United States (prior to Margaret Sanger's local legalization and nationwide Griswold v. Connecticut).

== Early life ==
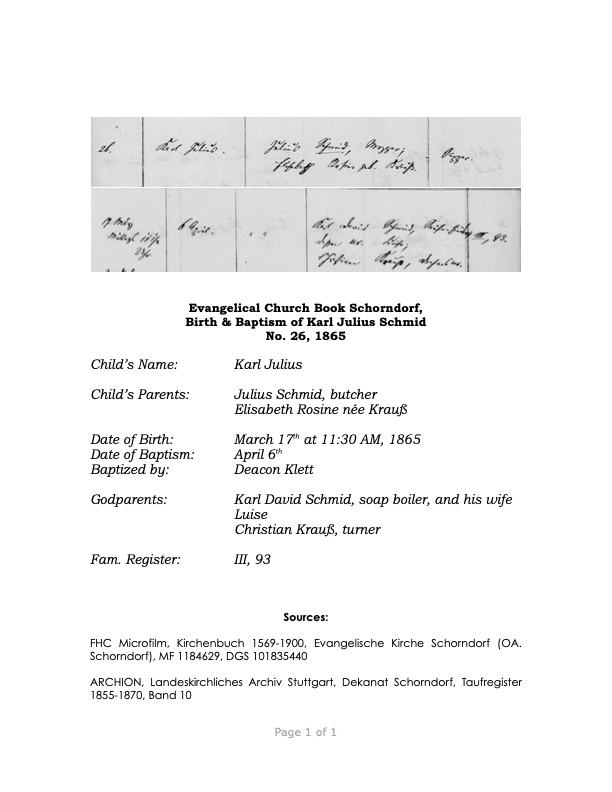
Evangelical Church Book Schorndorf, Birth & Baptism of Karl Julius Schmid No. 26, 1865.

Julius Schmid was born on March 17, 1865, in Schorndorf, Kingdom of Württemberg. He was born Karl Julius Schmid but was known as Julius throughout his life. Born into a Christian family, the son of a butcher, the Schmid Family is recorded in the Evangelical Church book of Schorndorf and in Strümpfelbach with the original spelling of the name being Schmid. Julius Schmid's ancestors have been researched back 8 generations to the last half of the 17th century on both the paternal and maternal sides and all of his ancestors were born and shortly thereafter baptized Christian.

Despite being a paralytic from infancy and walking with 2 canes for most of his life, Julius persuaded his grandfather to give him passage to America where he emigrated to New York City in 1882 at the age of 17.

== Career ==
Once in the United States he founded Julius Schmid Company in 1883. Julius’ early beginnings in New York were difficult. Unable to find a job, he soon found himself having to sell his clothes and sleeping on park benches. He eventually managed to find work with a sausage-casing manufacturer and began to sell skins on the side which led to his founding of a contraceptive company.

By the 1930s the company had become one of the leading contraceptive manufacturers in the United States and Fortune magazine declared Julius as the industry's "grand old man." His early commitment to quality earned him loyal customers and brand recognition that would make his company one of the largest condom companies in the world. Among the brands manufactured by Julius Schmid were Fourex, Ramses and Sheik and during the World Wars, in an effort to prevent disease among the soldiers, the Schmid company was asked by the US military to become the official supplier of condoms overseas.

As the company prospered, Julius developed a second business which became the nationally renowned Beaverdam Stock Farm, a Holstein breeding operation. In 1935 he then expanded and added a major tuberculosis-free milk production business.

== Personal life and legacy ==
Julius Schmid moved to Los Angeles with his wife Elisabeth around 1930 and resided in Beverly Hills until he died but remained active in both his business ventures while his two sons, Carl and Julius [known as Junior], ran the day-to-day operations.

Julius died June 6, 1939, and was buried in Forest Lawn, Glendale California. After Julius’ death his two sons continued to run and expand the company worldwide. By 1950 the company was selling over half the condoms manufactured in America, and was expanding throughout Canada, and opening plants in Christchurch, New Zealand; Humacao, P.R.; and Anderson, S.C.

In 1963 Julius Schmid Inc. was sold to LRC International, formerly the London Rubber Company International, and the name was changed to Schmid Laboratories Inc.
