= Scooba =

Scooba may refer to:

- Scooba (brand), a cleaning robot belonging to iRobot Corporation
- Scooba, Mississippi, United States

== See also ==
- Scuba (disambiguation)
