= Schorndorf =

- Town
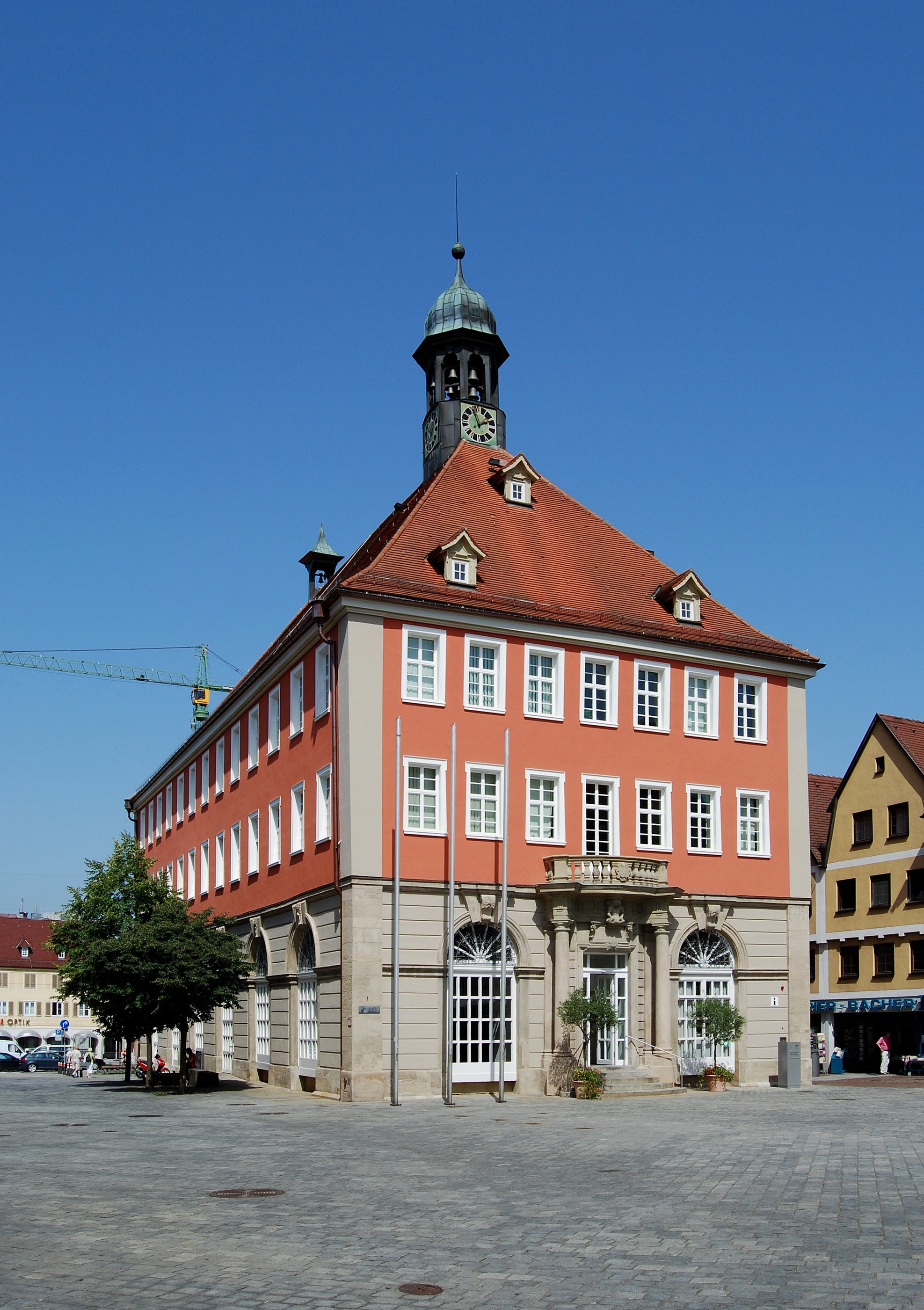
- Town hall on the Markt Square

- Flag Coat of arms

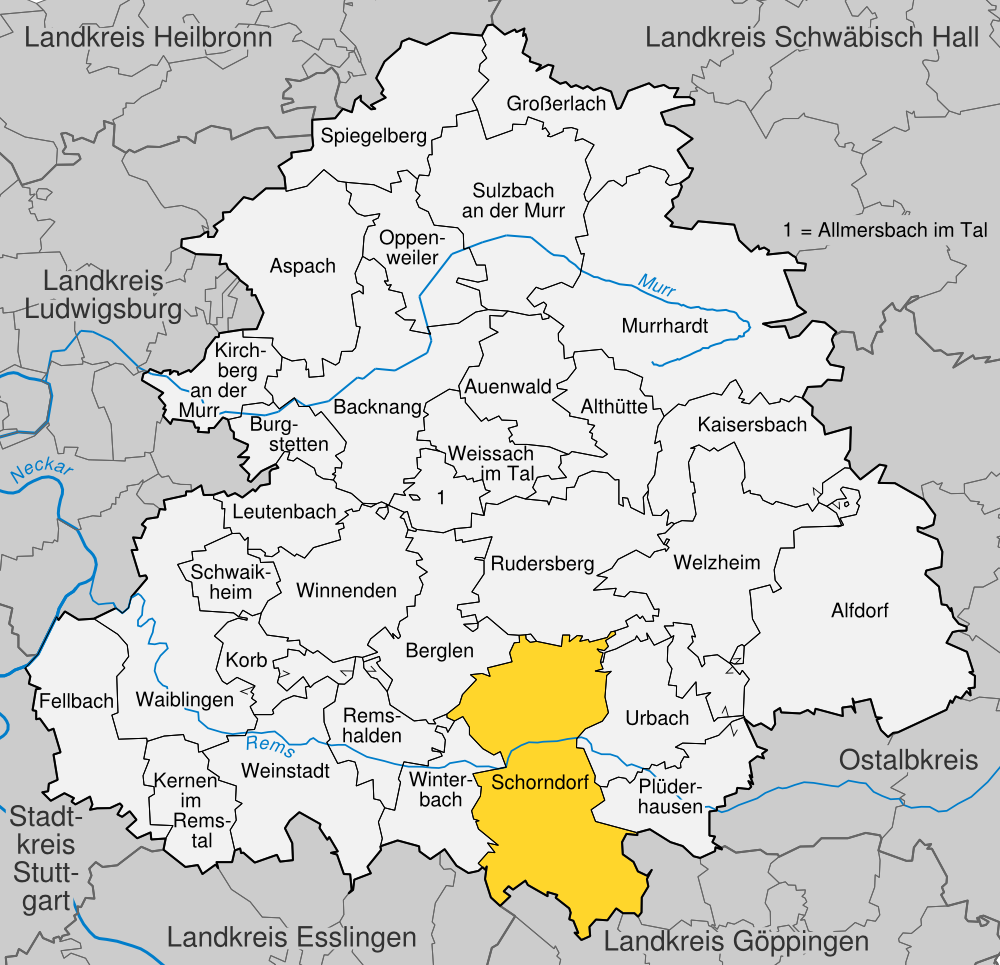
- Location of Schorndorf within Rems-Murr-Kreis district
- Interactive map of Schorndorf
- Location within Germany Location within Baden-Württemberg
- Coordinates: 48°48′N 09°32′E
- Country: Germany
- State: Baden-Württemberg
- Admin. region: Stuttgart
- District: Rems-Murr-Kreis
- Subdivisions: Town and 7 quarters

Government
  - Mayor (2021–29): Bernd Hornikel (Ind.)

Area
  - Total: 56.83 km^{2} (21.94 sq mi)
- Elevation: 256 m (840 ft)

Population (2025-12-31)
  - Total: 41,469
  - Density: 729.7/km^{2} (1,890/sq mi)
- Time zone: UTC+01:00 (CET)
  - Summer (DST): UTC+02:00 (CEST)
- Postal codes: 73601–73614
- Dialling codes: 07181
- Vehicle registration: WN
- Website: www.schorndorf.de

Schorndorf (German pronunciation: [ˈʃɔʁnˌdɔʁf]) is a town in Baden-Württemberg, Germany, located approximately 26 km east of Stuttgart. Its train station is the terminus of the S2 line of the Stuttgart S-Bahn.

The town is also sometimes referred to as Die Daimlerstadt (The Daimler Town in English), as it is the town in which Gottlieb Daimler (1834–1900) was born.

== Demographics ==
The numbers of inhabitants are estimates, census results (1871–1970 and 1987) or data from statistical office Before 1871 the results are only from the core town.

Year	Number of inhabitants
1463	c. 2,000
1514	c. 3,000
1618	c. 5,000
1701	2,132
1803	3,434
1834	3,777
1849	3,617
1 December 1871	7,672
1 December 1890	8,777
1 December 1900	9,704
1 December 1910	10,884
16 June 1925	11,568
16 June 1933	12,319

Year	Number of inhabitants
17 May 1939	13,186
13 September 1950	19,942
6 June 1961	26,384
27 May 1970	31,149
31 December 1975	32,918
31 December 1980	33,631
27 May 1987	35,759
31 December 1990	37,687
31 December 1995	38,005
31 December 2000	38,852
31 December 2005	39,305
31 December 2010	39,236

== Mayors ==
- 1819–1821: Christian Rapp (politician) (1771–1853)
- 1821–1828: Gottlieb Friedrich von Stum (1791–1849)
- 1828–1845: Philipp Friedrich Palm (1759–1845)
- 1845–1866:
- 1866–1872: Johannes Frasch
- 1879–1903: Jakob Friz
- 1903–1905: Heinrich Beisswanger
- 1905–1933: Jakob Raible (1870–1949)
- 1933–1945: Richard Beeg (1888–1945)
- 1945: Walter Arnold (entrepreneur) (1891–1973)
- 1945–1948: Gottlob Kamm (SPD) (1897–1973)
- 1948–1954: Emil Hayer (1887–1977)
- 1954–1962: Franz Illenberger (1902–1974)
- 1962–1982: Rudolf Bayler (1917–2007)
- 1982–1990: Reinhard Hanke (SPD) (born 1940)
- 1990–2006: Winfried Kübler (CDU) (born 1939)
- since 2006: Matthias Klopfer (SPD) (born 1968)

== Places of interest ==
- Ostlandkreuz

== Twin towns – sister cities ==
Schorndorf is twinned with:

- Bury, United Kingdom (1994)
- Dueville, Italy (1998)
- Errenteria, Spain (2012)
- Kahla, Germany (1991)
- Radenthein, Austria (1966)
- Tulle, France (1969)
- Tuscaloosa, United States (1996)
- Svitlovodsk, Ukraine (2023)

== Notable people ==
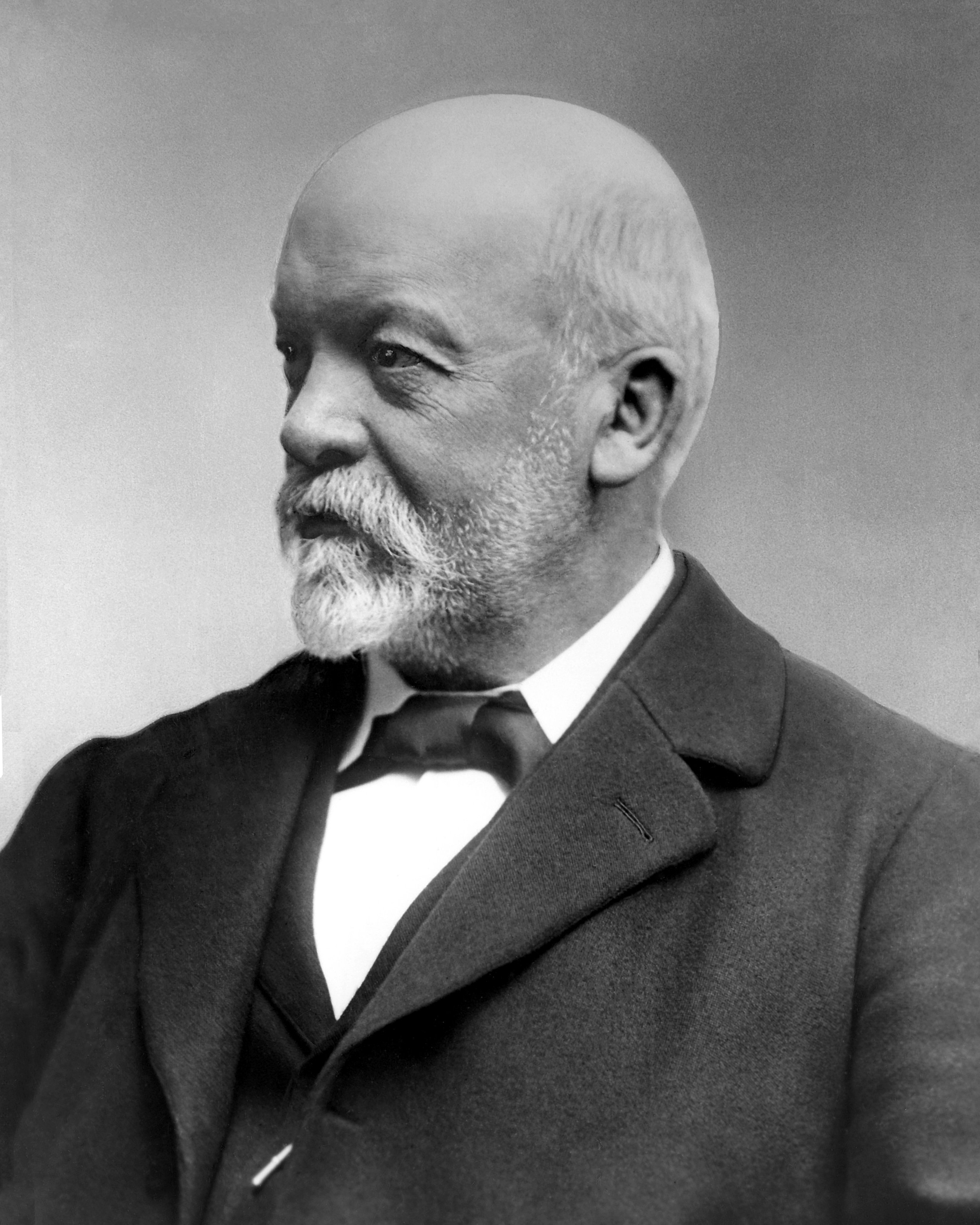
Gottlieb Daimler, 1890s

- Jakob Schegk (1511–1587), a polymath Aristotelian philosopher and academic physician.
- Johann Schmidlap (16th-century) a Bavarian fireworks maker and rocket pioneer.
- Josias Weitbrecht (1702–1747), an important professor of medicine and anatomy
- Ludovike Simanowiz (1759–1827), a portrait painter in the Classical style.
- Charles-Frédéric Reinhard (1761–1837), French statesman, writer, diplomat and politician
- Johann Philipp Palm (1766–1806), bookseller and strong anti-French agitator.
- Gottlieb Daimler (1834–1900), engineer, designer and industrialist
- Julius Schmid (1865–1955), inventor and entrepreneur, pioneer of condom manufacturing.
- Reinhold Maier (1889–1971), politician (FDP), 1st Minister President of the new Baden-Württemberg until 1953.
- Gerhard Graf-Martinez (born 1952), flamenco guitarist, author and composer

=== Sport ===
- Edmond Haan (1924–2018), French footballer
- Kostas Konstantinidis (born 1972), Greek footballer, played 358 games and 38 for Greece
- Ricarda Lisk (born 1981), triathlete
- Timo Lienemann (born 1985), racing driver
- Sven Ulreich (born 1988), footballer, played over 330 games
- Davie Selke (born 1995), footballer, played over 260 games
- Bernd Mayländer (born 1971), F1 Safety Car driver since 2000

== Gallery ==
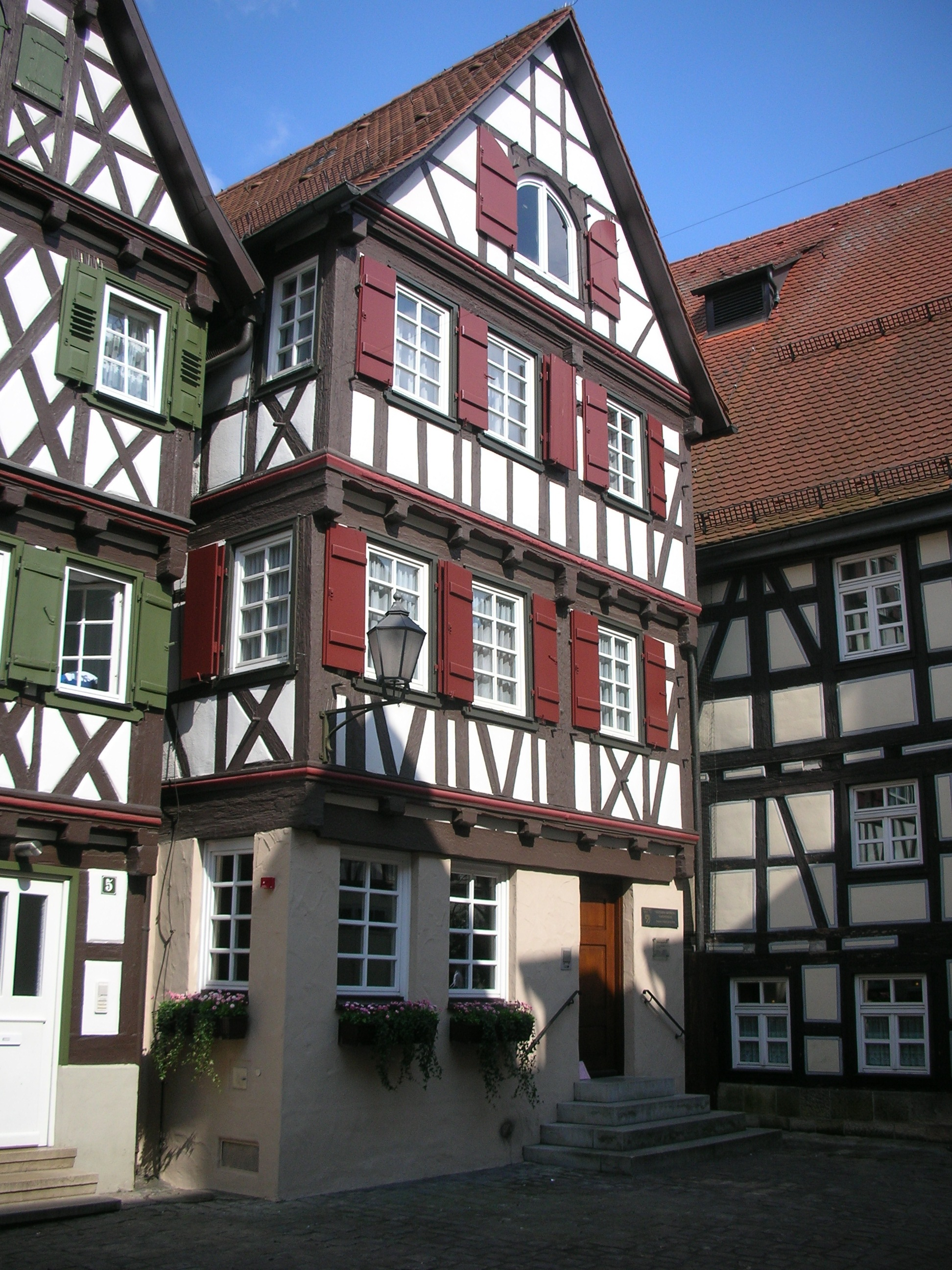
The birthplace of Gottlieb Daimler

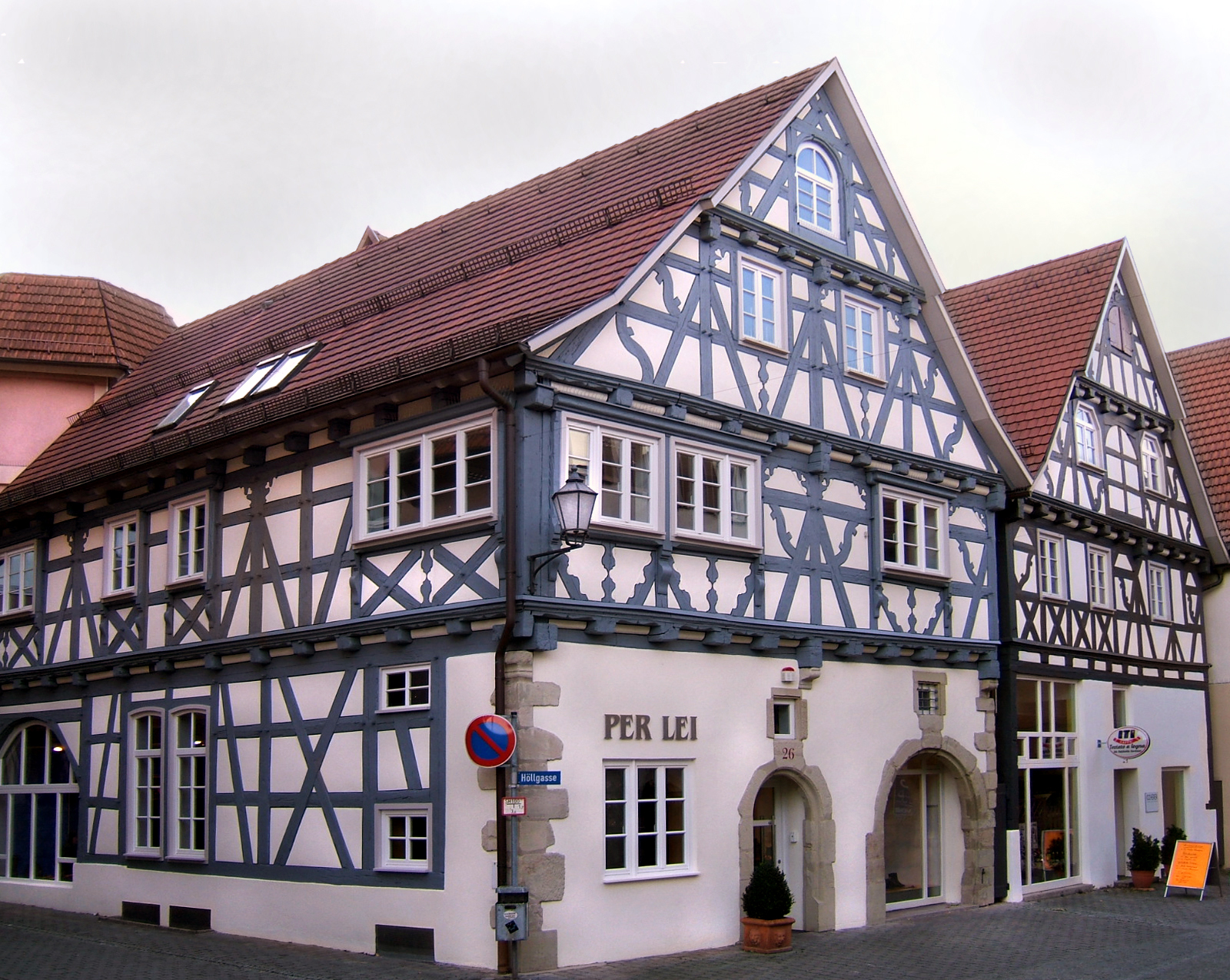
An example of the timber-framed homes of the old town

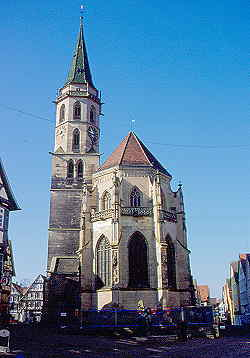
The east side of the evangelical church

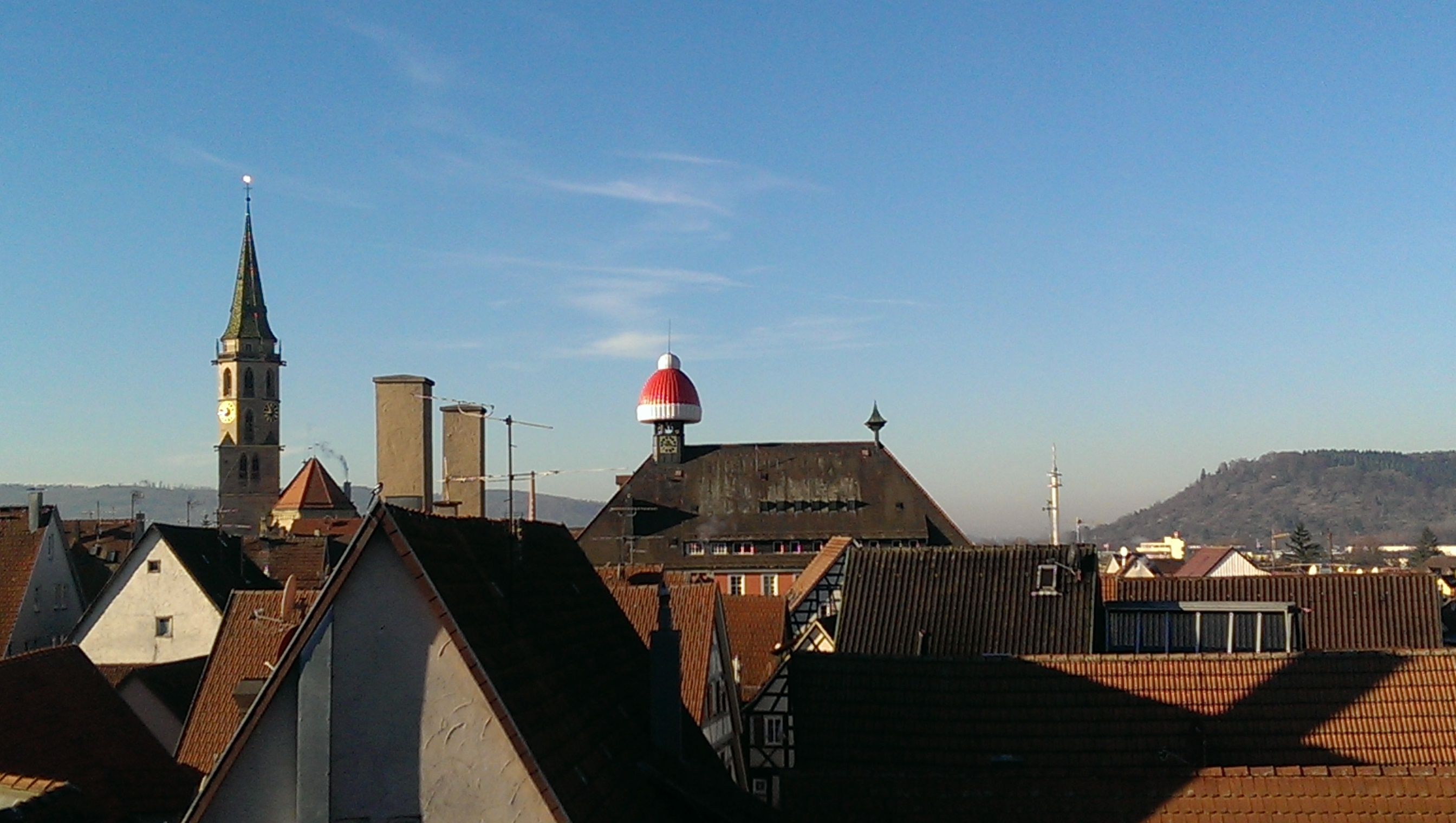
Rooftop perspective over the old town, including the hat on top of the town hall during the annual Christmas Market

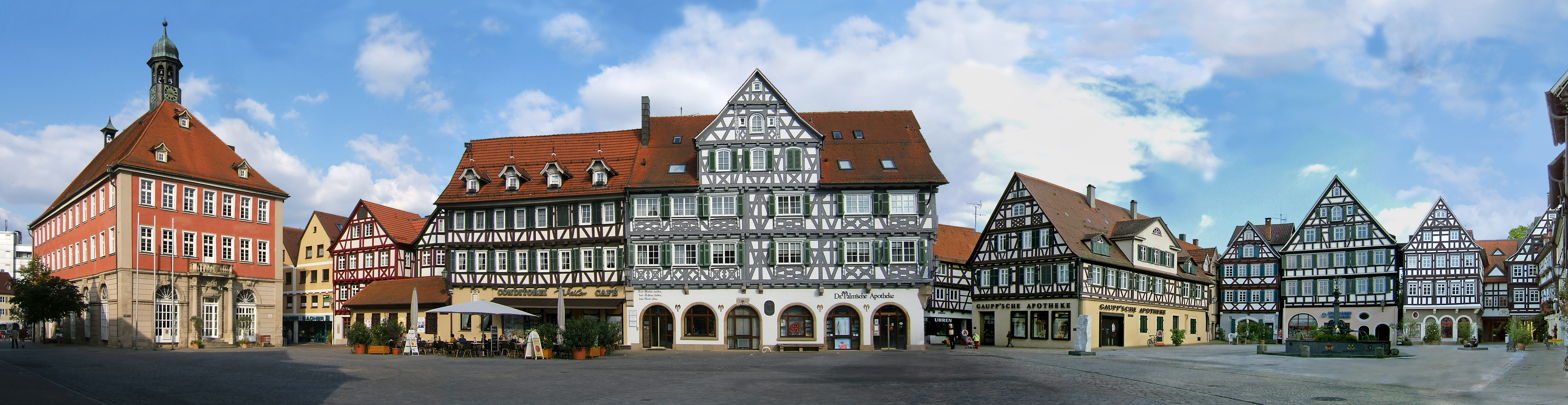
Panorama of the upper Markt Square
