= Cardinal Principles of Secondary Education =

Cardinal Principles of Secondary Education were secondary education objectives created by the Commission on the Reorganization of Secondary Education (CRSE) of the National Education Association (NEA) in the United States in 1918 as one approach to reforming secondary schools in the U.S. by segmenting topics. The work on identifying objectives had been started in 1915. This report represents the end of a series of reports addressing standardization of education that began with the Committee of Ten report, which was published in 1894. The report was subsequently published as a Bulletin by the United States Bureau of Education.

The objectives issued by the Commission on the Reorganization of Secondary Education were:

1. Health.
2. Command of fundamental processes.
3. Worthy home membership.
4. Vocation.
5. Citizenship.
6. Worthy use of leisure.
7. Ethical character.

It was recognized that enumerating the principles should not be interpreted as identifying separate area of study but rather these were interrelated topics.
