= William Scholl =

American foot doctor and businessman

William M. Scholl
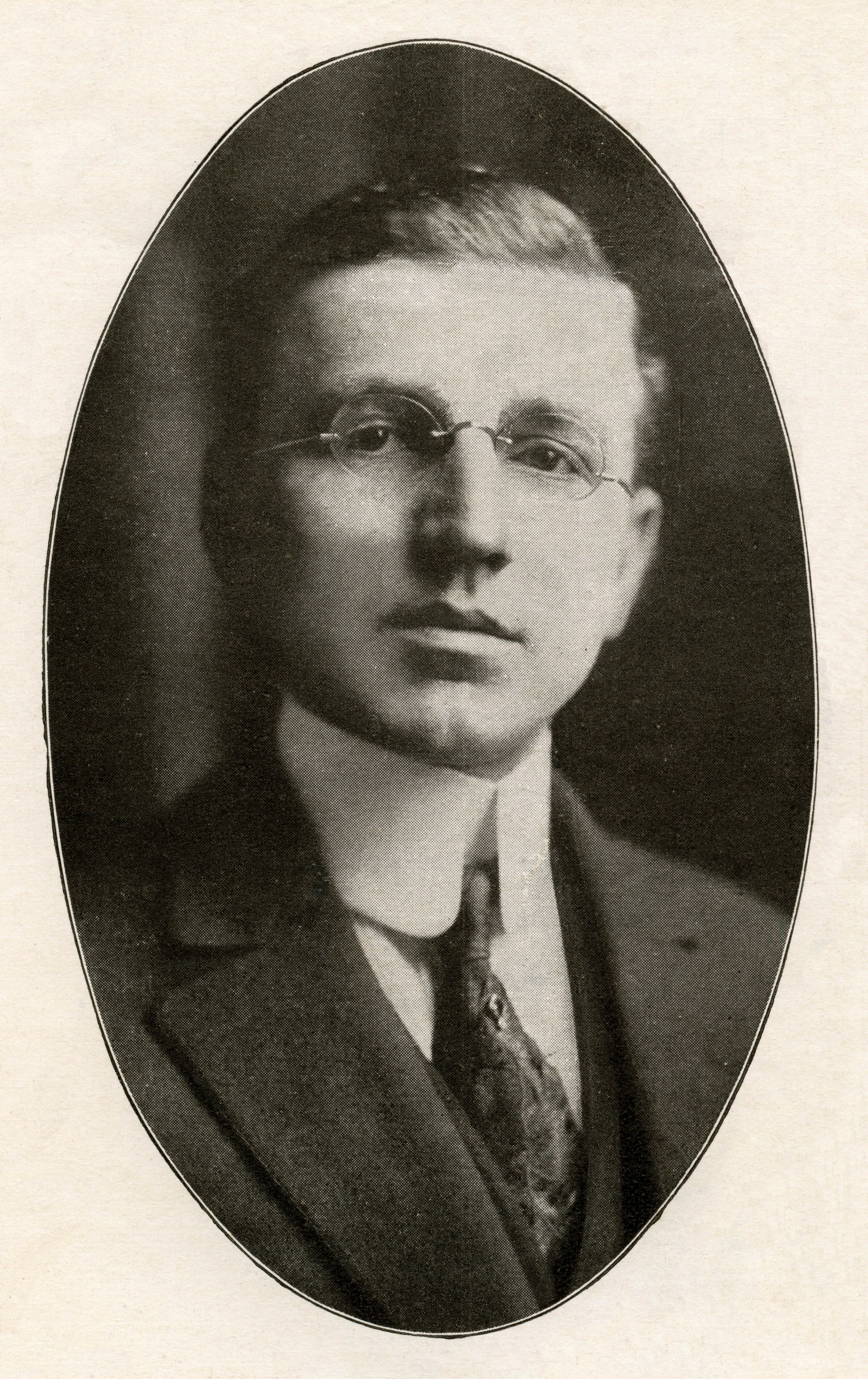
- 1919
- Born: William Mathias Scholl; June 22, 1882; La Porte, Indiana, U.S.
- Died: March 29, 1968 (aged 85); Chicago, Illinois, U.S.
- Resting place: Pine Lake Cemetery; La Porte, Indiana
- Education: Chicago Medical School (M.D.)
- Occupation: Physician
- Known for: Founding Dr. Scholl's footwear

William Mathias Scholl (June 22, 1882 – March 29, 1968) was an American physician, a pioneer of foot care, and the founder of Dr. Scholl's, a brand of foot care products.

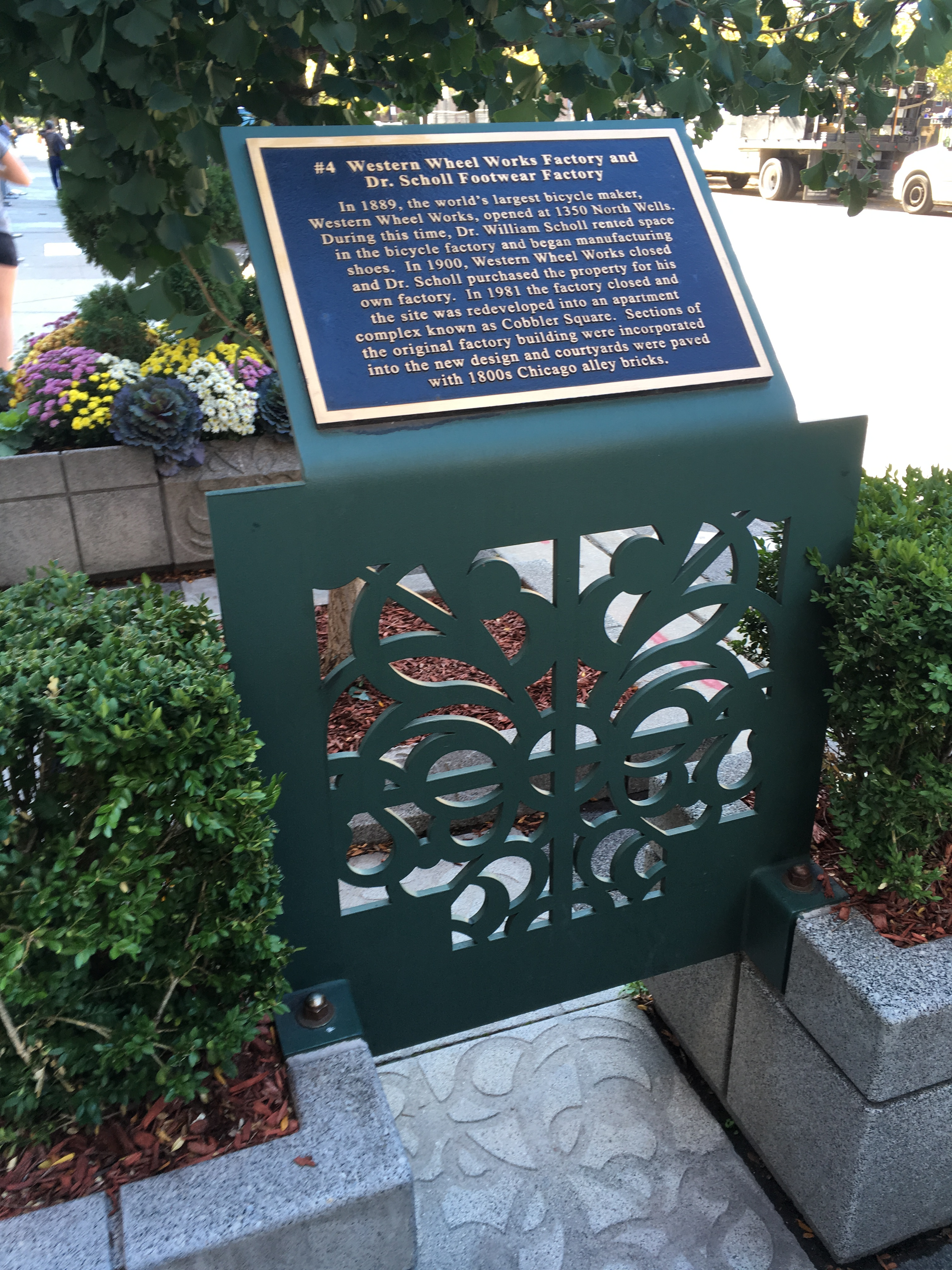
Scholl's historical marker (26478216869)

== Early life and career ==
William Mathias Scholl was born in La Porte, Indiana as one of 13 children. He studied medicine at Loyola University Chicago. During his studies, while working in a shoe store in the evenings, he became interested in podiatry. In 1904 he invented and patented an arch support and founded the company Dr. Scholl's to sell it. He was joined by his brother Frank who directed the company's overseas business, establishing Scholl Manufacturing Company, Ltd. in London in 1910.

He graduated from the Chicago Medical School in 1922. He went on to develop more than 1,000 foot aids. These included a silver clip designed in 1946 to treat ingrown toenails. While too soft to have much of a corrective effect and difficult to apply, it inspired later steel clip designs.

Scholl practiced medicine in Chicago from 1905 until 1946 while also directing his company. He bought a building and added to it for manufacturing in Chicago at 213 W. Schiller Street (now renovated as Cobbler Square). By 1918 he employed over 300 leather cutters, press operators, machinists, packers and shippers. He continued to serve as the company's President and chief executive officer until March 1968, when he was elected Chairman of the Board. He worked in that capacity until his death.

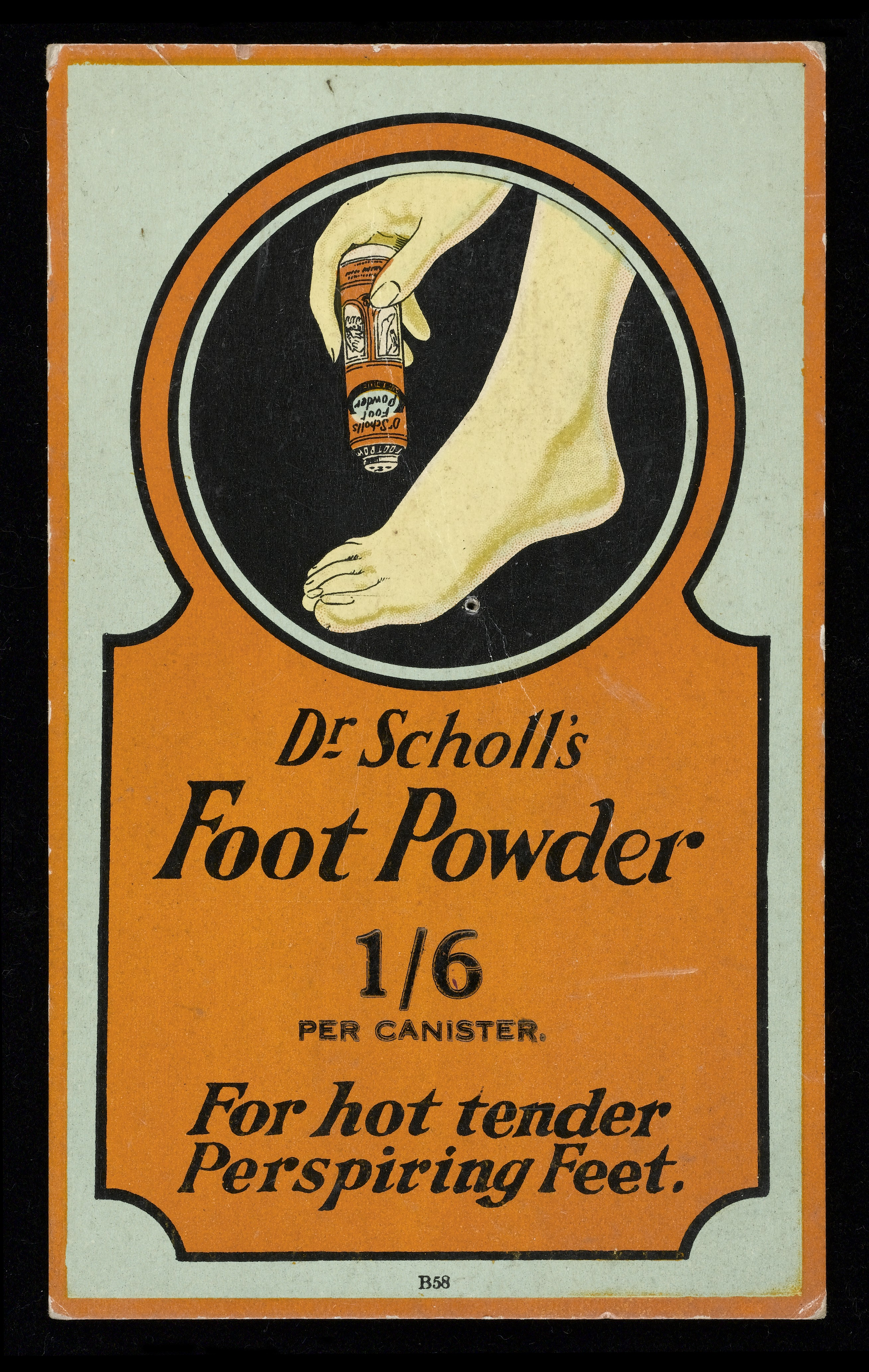
Advert for Dr Scholl's Foot Powder Wellcome L0040545

Scholl was also famous for his advertising acumen, direct marketing to shoe stores, and establishment of "Foot Comfort Week".

== Legacy ==
He left the bulk of his estate to the Dr. Scholl Foundation which he had established in 1947. The Foundation has awarded over $224 million between 1980 and 2022. The Foundation funded the Dr. William M. Scholl Center for American History and Culture at the Newberry Library from 1971 to 2017. It was a primary funder of the Encyclopedia of Chicago. Pamela Scholl, President of the Dr. Scholl Foundation since 1994, was highlighted by the Trust for the National Mall.

== Personal life ==
Scholl never married. He was characterized as quirky, and he carried the skeleton model of a foot in his pocket. He attributed his success to the motto, "early to bed, early to rise, work like hell and advertise." His brother Frank, who had helped set up the original company, had sons who were involved in the company and foot care. Most notable was his nephew, William Scholl, who designed a wooden sandal.

== Selected publications ==
- The Human Foot: Anatomy, Physiology, Mechanics, Deformities and Treatment (1915)
- Practipedics: The Science of Giving Foot Comfort and Correcting the Cause of Foot and Shoe Troubles (1917)
- Treatment and Care of the Feet (1930)
- Podology: Based on the Experience, Inventions, Foot Comfort System and Methods of Dr. William M. Scholl (1932)

== See also ==
- Dr. William M. Scholl College of Podiatric Medicine
