= SSL International =

Defunct British company

SSL International plc
- Type: Subsidiary
- Industry: Healthcare
- Founded: 1999; 27 years ago
- Defunct: 2010; 16 years ago
- Fate: Acquired by and folded into Reckitt
- Headquarters: London, UK
- Products: Durex; Scholl
- Revenue: £642.4 million (2009)
- Operating income: £89.5 million (2009)
- Net income: £55.5 million (2009)
- Parent: Reckitt
- Website: www.ssl-international.com

SSL International plc was a British manufacturer of healthcare products. Its best known brands were Durex and Scholl; other significant brands were Sauber and Mister Baby. The company's name was an abbreviation of Seton Scholl London International, its predecessor businesses. The company was founded in 1929 and was listed on the London Stock Exchange. In November 2010, SSL International plc was folded into Reckitt.

== Background ==
=== Scholl plc ===
Dr. Scholl's was founded in 1906, by Chicago-based podiatrist William M Scholl. Opening its first shop in London in 1913, after the death of Dr Scholl it was listed publicly on the New York Stock Exchange in 1972, and became a member of the Fortune 500. Bought by Schering-Plough in 1978, the company sold the global brand and non-North American operations to Basingstoke-based home appliance electrical manufacturer European Home Products in 1984.

=== London Rubber Company ===
The London Rubber Company was founded in 1915 by LA Jackson, selling imported condoms and barber shop supplies. Subsequently renamed London International Group (LIG) plc, it developed a consumer based product portfolio, spanning health and beauty products including Durex, medical markets with Regent surgical gloves, and business-to-business with Marigold Industrial Gloves.

=== Seton Healthcare plc ===
Seton Healthcare plc was founded in 1952 by Ivor Stoller, selling tubular bandages. The company floated on the London Stock Exchange in 1990 and, in 1992, it added over the counter consumer drugs to its portfolio when it bought Blackburn-based patent medicines maker Cupal - and with it brands including Cuprofen, Full Marks Mousse and Meltus - for the equivalent of $12.4 million, as well as acquiring the rights to manufacture and market Betadine antiseptics.

== Merger of Seton and Scholl ==
In July 1998, Scholl and Seton merged to become Seton Scholl plc. In 1999, Seton Scholl and LIG merged to become Seton Scholl London International Group plc, shortened to SSL International. The integration of these two businesses was led by Stuart Wallis, the first chairman of SSL, who left the company in 2001.

From 2002 to 2004 the company disposed of its medical and industrial products to focus on its two main brands as part of a "strategic repositioning". The first major diversification was of 21 OTC brands to Thornton & Ross Limited in March 2002. Marigold Industrial Gloves was sold to Comasec SAS in November 2003. The wound management products were sold to Medlock Medical Limited (owned by Apax Partners) in May 2004. Regent Infection Control (makers of Biogel surgical gloves and Hibi antiseptics) was also sold to a business owned by Apax Partners in May 2004 for £173 million. The final sale was of the minor Silipos business to Langer Inc in October 2004.

In November 2007 the company acquired Orthaheel, an Australian business selling insoles designed and marketed by podiatrist Phillip Vasyli. In 2008, the company acquired Crest Condoms, a Swiss based condom brand.

== Takeover ==
By the beginning of 2010, the company was listed on the FTSE 250, and had a commercial presence in over thirty countries, and manufacturing plants in the United Kingdom, Spain, China, India, Thailand and CIS. In July 2010, SSL agreed to be bought by household products company Reckitt in a £2.5 billion deal. The takeover was completed in November 2010 and SSL was then folded into Reckitt.
