= Scuba =

Scuba, originally SCUBA, often expanded to scuba set, is any "self-contained underwater breathing apparatus", a source of breathing gas used for underwater diving which is carried by the diver.

Scuba may also refer to:

- Scuba diving, swimming underwater while breathing from a gas supply carried by the diver,
- Scuba, an in-memory database developed by Facebook
- Submillimetre Common-User Bolometer Array, either of two instruments used on the James Clerk Maxwell Telescope
- Scuba (musician)
- Scuba (album), 1984 P-Model album

== See also ==
- Scooba (disambiguation)
