= One Male Condom =

Brand of condoms

One Male Condom is a natural rubber latex condom product specifically intended, evaluated and marketed for use during anal sex, as well as being approved for use as a contraceptive and to reduce the risk of sexually transmitted infections (STIs) by vaginal sex. It received US Food and Drug Administration (FDA) approval to be marketed for anal sex use on February 23, 2022. All previous FDA condom approvals were specifically only approvals for use with vaginal sex, and thus their use was off-label for anal sex. When used for anal sex, the One Male Condom product is intended to be used with a compatible water-based personal lubricant.

The labeling on the packages refers to the condom brand as "ONE" (for general-use condoms) or "MyONE" (for fitted condoms) and does not include the word "Male" (or even "condoms") as part of the brand name. On the day of the FDA approval, the company issued a press release that, in addition to celebrating the approval, said "Our brand is ONE Condoms, not 'One Male Condom'. FDA still uses 'male condom' as a term, and listed us as 'One Male Condom' in their press release."

The product is made by Global Protection Corp., a formerly separate company based in Boston, Massachusetts, and founded in 1987 by two Tufts University students. Since 2016, Global Protection Corp. has been majority-owned by the Malaysian condom manufacturer Karex, and it took over full ownership in 2020. As of 2020, Karex is the world's largest producer of condoms.

== Variations ==
Three basic versions of the One brand condom are produced, called standard, thin and fitted. The fitted condoms are available in more than 50 different sizes, and a paper template is provided to assist with identifying the best fitted size for each user, selecting among 10 lengths and 9 widths.

== Efficacy ==
The study of efficacy included evaluation of condom failures, discomfort, STIs, and urinary tract infections (UTIs). The results were described in an FDA press release, saying:

The safety and efficacy of the One Male Condom was studied in a clinical trial comprised of 252 men who have sex with men and 252 men who have sex with women. All participants were between 18 through 54 years old.

The study found that the total condom failure rate was 0.68% for anal intercourse and 1.89% for vaginal intercourse with the One Male Condom. Condom failure rate was defined as the number of slippage, breakage or both slippage and breakage events that occurred over the total number of sex acts performed. For the One Male Condom, the overall percentage of adverse events was 1.92%. Adverse events reported during the clinical trial included symptomatic STI or recent STI diagnosis (0.64%), condom or lubricant-related discomfort (0.85%), partner discomfort with lubricant (0.21%) and partner urinary tract infection (0.21%). The symptomatic STI or recent STI diagnoses observed in the study were self-reported and may be the result of subjects having intercourse without a condom or may have preceded use of the One Male Condom, as STIs were not measured at baseline.

— U.S. Food and Drug Administration

Trial participants were specifically instructed to use a water-soluble lubricant with each act of anal intercourse – an instruction that was not given for acts of vaginal intercourse. When used with an appropriate lubricant, a lower failure rate is expected for latex condoms like the One Male Condom than for polyurethane condoms, and the failure rates are not expected to differ between acts of anal versus vaginal intercourse.
