= Karex =

Malaysian condom manufacturer

Karex Berhad
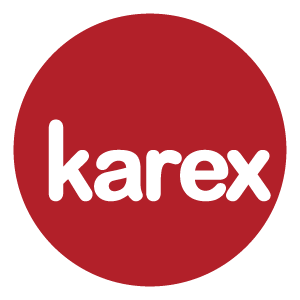
- Type: Public limited company
- Traded as: MYX: 5247
- Industry: Sexual health and healthcare products
- Founded: 1988 in Johor, Malaysia
- Headquarters: Port Klang, Malaysia
- Area served: Worldwide
- Key people: Goh Miah Kiat, CEO
- Products: Condoms; Sexual lubricant; Gloves; Catheters; Ultrasound probe covers
- Brands: Carex; ONE Condoms; MyONE Custom Fit Condoms; Pasante; Custom Condoms; NuVo Condoms; Fantasy Condoms; Satin Dams; Trustex; Adore
- Revenue: ▼RM378 million (2019); RM406 million (2018)
- Website: www.karex.com.my

Karex Berhad is a Malaysian condom manufacturer, one of the largest in the world. It produces more than five billion condoms a year and one in every five condoms globally. The company also supplies condoms to marketing brands like Durex.

== Operations ==
The company operates three factories in Malaysia. One of the factories is at its headquarters in Port Klang, and the other two are in Pontian and Senai. The company also operates a factory in Hat Yai, Thailand.

Karex supplies condoms to brands such as Durex, but it also sells condoms directly to customers through its own brands such as Carex. In addition to the consumer market, the company sells condoms in bulk to groups like the United Nations and the World Health Organization for use in the prevention of the spread of HIV.

Although Karex's main product is condoms, which accounted for 93 percent of its revenue in 2016, the company also manufactures personal lubricant, catheters, nitrile gloves, and ultrasound probe covers.

== History ==
The company traces its history to a rubber tree farm and rubber factory owned by Goh Huang Chiat in Muar, Johor in Malaysia. The condom factory was founded in 1988 by two of Goh's sons, Goh Siang, a chemical engineer, and Goh Leng Kian, a mechanical engineer. By 1999, the company had grown to 60 employees, with an annual revenue of $1.9 million. In 2013, it was listed on the Bursa Malaysia.

The company's business operations have been adversely affected by the COVID-19 pandemic in Malaysia. Due to a government-mandated lockdown in Malaysia, the company was forced to halt all production for over a week in late March 2020 at all three of its Malaysia factories. The Malaysian government eventually allowed the company to reopen its factories but with only 50 percent of its workforce. The reduction in capacity is expected to cause strain in the global supply chain for condoms and a possible global condom shortage.

In February 2022, ONE Condoms and MyONE Condoms became the first condom brand to receive FDA approval for use during anal sex.

On October 3, 2023, ONE Condoms released ONE Flex, the first condom in the world to be made with graphene.

As a result of the economic crisis caused by the 2026 Iran war, the chief executive, Goh Miah Kiat, announced that the prices of the company’s products would rise by up to 30% or more.

== Acquisitions ==
Karex acquired a 55% stake in Boston based Global Protection Corp. in 2014. Global Protection Corp. is the company behind the brands ONE Condoms, Trustex, NuVo, Fantasy, Night Light, and Satin Oral Dams. Karex later acquired the remaining 30% stake in Global Protection Corp. for RM 42.26 million, alongside the issuance of new shares.

Karex issued 82.93 million new shares to Global Protection Corp. president and director Davin Wedel. The acquisition positions Wedel to own 7.64% of the enlarged company while Karex Global Ltd. owns 100% of Global Protection Corp.

Pasante Healthcare Limited was acquired by Karex Berhad in 2016 for £6 million. Karex's wholly-own subsidiary, Karex Holdings Sdn Bhd acquired the entire stake in the West Sussex, United Kingdom based company.

Karex acquired the intellectual property of TheyFit LLC, as well as FDA approvals for US$1.3 million. Karex's subsidiary, Global Protection Corp will manage the intellectual property, adding select sizes from the TheyFit offering to a new brand, MyONE Custom Fit Condoms.

The intellectual property of Line One Laboratories was acquired by Karex in 2016 for US$8 million. Line One owned the intellectual property rights for trademarks and patents of Trustex and Fantasy brand condoms.

In January 2026, Karex subsidiary Global Protection Corp. announced that it has secured exclusive licensing rights for Harmony Condoms from Pamco Brands.
