= Sigma Kappa Upsilon Mu =

Fraternity at Michigan Tech University, US

- ΣΚΥΜ
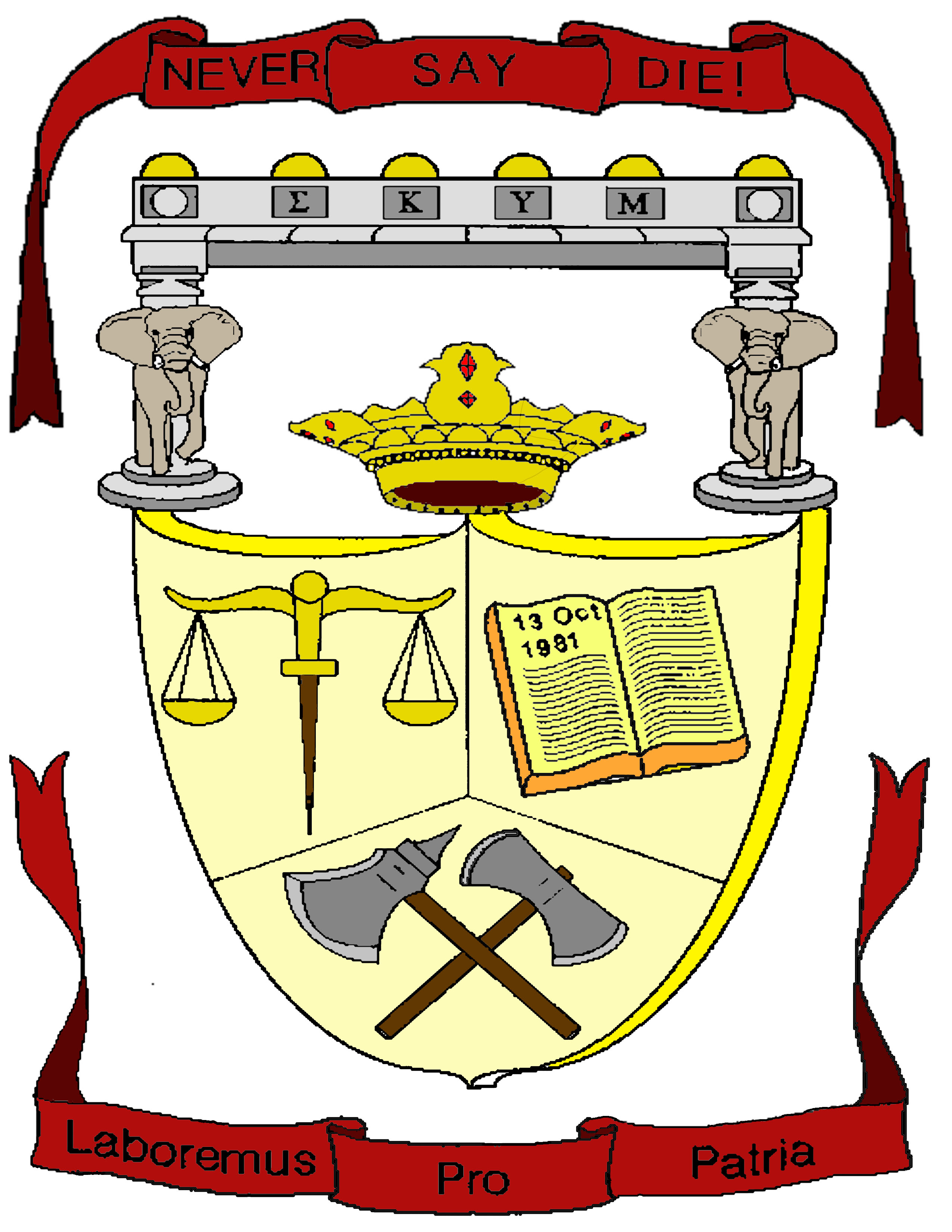
- Founded: October 13, 1981; 43 years ago Michigan Technological University
- Type: Social
- Affiliation: Independent
- Status: Active
- Scope: Local
- Colors: Black and Red
- Symbol: Elephant
- Philanthropy: Local
- Chapters: 1
- Headquarters: 223 Blanche St. Houghton, Michigan 49931; United States
- Website: www.skum.org

Sigma Kappa Upsilon Mu (ΣΚΥΜ) is a local fraternity founded on October 13, 1981 at Michigan Technological University in Houghton, Michigan.

== Overview ==
Sigma Kappa Upsilon Mu’s constitution was submitted to the dean of students, Harold Messe, who ratified it. Sigma Kappa Upsilon Mu was founded by the following twelve men: James Haferkorn, Kent Klausner, John Chapman, Jim Ply, Jeffrey Parks, Mike Mallos, Phil Van Riper, Rick Michaels, Tim Lodge, Joe Rokosz, Paul Brewer, Scott Muller.

== History ==
Michigan Technological University in Houghton, Michigan was the first college to accept Sigma Kappa Upsilon Mu as a fraternal ‘No-Frills’ original organization. The main incentives that Sigma Kappa Upsilon Mu offers over other Fraternities is “greater affordability and less stringent obligations”. Sigma’s describe themselves as a group striving for loyal brotherhood that isn’t overly strict, this would be more accurate than calling them a fraternity (as traditional stigma’s emanate).

Following violations of the university’s alcohol provisions and a failure to re-register during the annual registration period, the fraternity’s status as a registered student organization was removed in November 2005.

== Symbols ==
Sigma Kappa Upsilon Mu’s colors are cherry red and black. Its animal is an elephant.
