= Scum of the Earth =

Scum of the earth is an idiom used in some bible translations, in Paul's First Epistle to the Corinthians, Chapter 4, Verse 13.

Scum of the Earth may also refer to:

- Scum of the Earth (book), a 1941 autobiography by Arthur Koestler
- Scum of the Earth!, a 1963 sexploitation film directed by Herschell Gordon Lewis
- "Scum of the Earth" (song), a 2000 Rob Zombie song
- Scum of the Earth (1974 film), a 1974 American horror film
- Scum of the Earth (band), a heavy metal band
- Scum of the Earth Church, in Denver, Colorado
- "Scum of the Earth", a fictional band featured in the episode "Hoodlum Rock", S01E04 of "WKRP in Cincinnati".
