= Scum Lake (Ontario) =

- Location of Scum Lake in Ontario
- Location: Thunder Bay, Ontario, Canada
- Coordinates: 48°22′32″N 88°49′45″W
- Type: Lake
- Part of: Great Lakes Basin
- Max. length: 260 m (850 ft)
- Max. width: 110 m (360 ft)
- Surface elevation: 264 m (866 ft)

Scum Lake is a lake on the Sibley Peninsula in geographic Sibley Township in the Unorganized Part of Thunder Bay District in Northwestern Ontario, Canada. It is part of the Great Lakes Basin and is located entirely in Sleeping Giant Provincial Park.

The primary outflow is an unnamed creek at the north east that flows to Mary Louise Lake, which in turn flows via Sibley Creek to Lake Superior.
