= Durex =

British condom brand

- Current owner: Reckitt Benckiser
- Country: United Kingdom
- Introduced: 1915; 111 years ago (as London Rubber Company)
- Previous owners: SSL International
- Website: durex.com

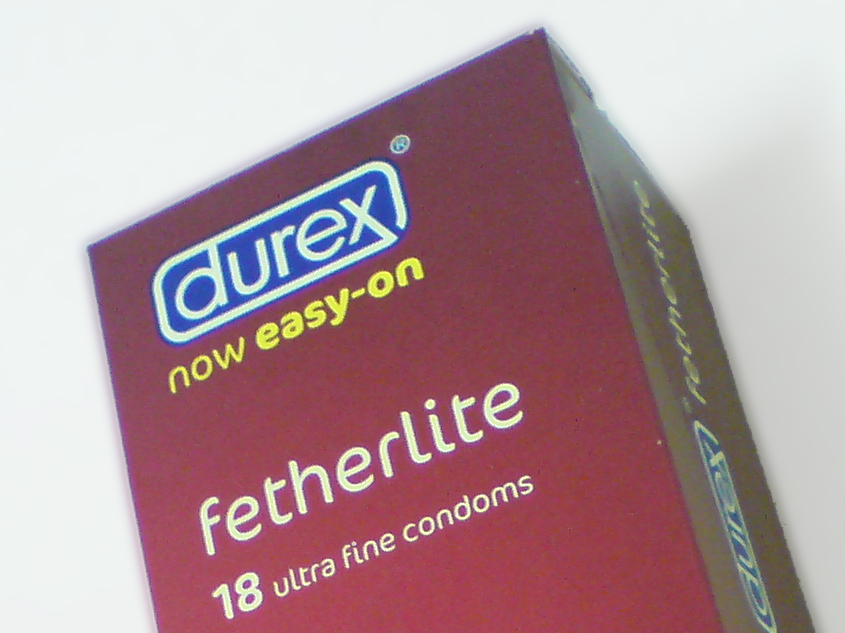
A box of Durex Fetherlite condoms

Durex is a British brand of condoms and personal lubricants owned by Reckitt Benckiser. It was initially developed in London under the purview of the London Rubber Company and British Latex Products Ltd, where it was manufactured between 1932 and 1994. The London Rubber Company was formed in 1915, and the Durex brand name ("Durability, reliability, and excellence") was launched in 1929, although London Rubber did not begin manufacturing own-brand condoms until 1932, in collaboration with a rubber technology student from Poland named Lucian Lundau.

The London Rubber Company later merged with SSL International, and has since 2010 been owned by the Anglo-Dutch company Reckitt Benckiser. It is one of the best-selling condom brands around the world, with 30% of the global market. In 2006, Durex condoms were the second-best-selling brand of condoms in the United States, with Trojan condoms being the first. It is supplied by, among others, the company Karex.

In 2007, the last factory making Durex condoms in the UK stopped manufacturing and production has since moved to China, India and Thailand. The modern range includes a wide variety of latex condom, including the Sheik and Ramses brands in North America, and the Avanti condom. Durex also provides a range of lubricants and sex toys.

Although Durex was not an official sponsor of the Olympic Games, Durex provided 150,000 free condoms to more than 10,000 athletes that competed in the 2012 Summer Olympics in London.

== Market share ==
=== China ===
Although condoms are not a widely used form of contraception in China, with only around 10% of sexually active people using them, among Chinese condom users Durex has a dominant market share of 45% as of 2015. Due to a relatively conservative culture surrounding sex, Durex's marketing in China is often indirect and subtle, often involving lighthearted humour. Marketing is done almost exclusively on social media. Durex has operated an account on the microblogging site Weibo in 2011, which had 2.65 million followers and more than 20,000 posts as of 2018. Durex targets Chinese users on Sina Weibo aged from 20 to 40, and primarily men under 35 years old. In 2011, Durex began cross-industry advertising tie-ins with the antivirus software company Trend Micro, using the common themes of "antivirus" and "security".
