= Medical glove =

Single-use glove worn during medical examinations and procedures

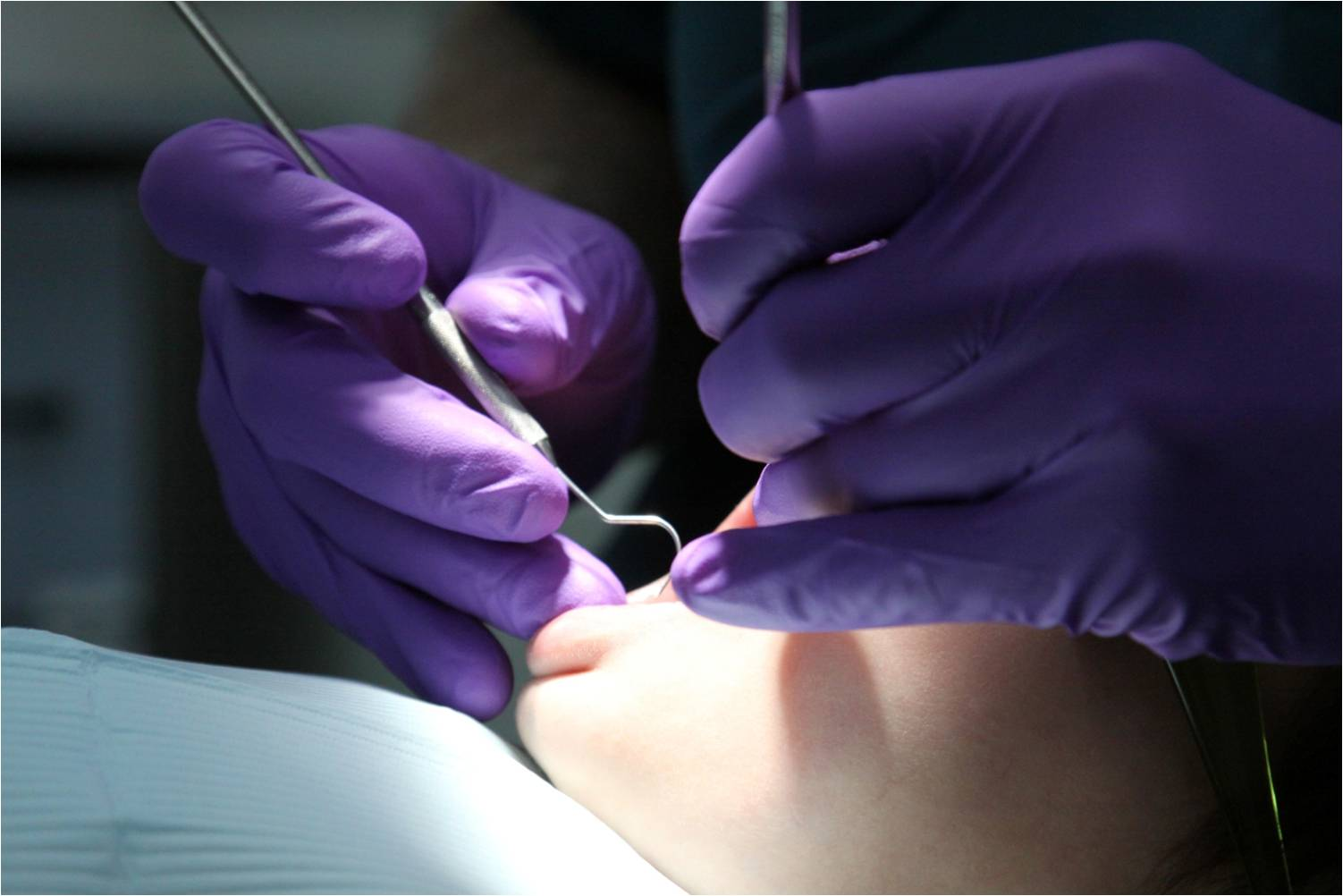
Dentist wearing nitrile gloves

Medical gloves are disposable gloves used during medical examinations and procedures to help prevent cross-contamination between caregivers and patients. Medical gloves are made of different polymers including latex, nitrile rubber, polyvinyl chloride and neoprene; they come unpowdered, or powdered with corn starch to lubricate the gloves, making them easier to put on the hands.

Corn starch replaced tissue-irritating lycopodium powder and talc, but even corn starch can impede healing if it gets into tissues (as during surgery). As such, unpowdered gloves are used more often during surgery and other sensitive procedures. Special manufacturing processes are used to compensate for the lack of powder.

There are two main types of medical gloves: examination and surgical. Surgical gloves have more precise sizing with a better precision and sensitivity and are made to a higher standard. Examination gloves are available either sterile or non-sterile, while surgical gloves are generally sterile.

Besides medicine, medical gloves are widely used in chemical and biochemical laboratories. Medical gloves offer some basic protection against corrosives and surface contamination. However, they are easily penetrated by solvents and various hazardous chemicals, and should not be used for dishwashing or otherwise when the task involves immersion of the gloved hand in the solvent. Medical gloves are recommended to be worn for two main reasons:

1. To reduce the risk of contamination of health-care workers hands with blood and other body fluids.
2. To reduce the risk of germ dissemination to the environment and of transmission from the health-care worker to the patient and vice versa, as well as from one patient to another.

== History ==
Caroline Hampton became the chief nurse of the operating room when Johns Hopkins Hospital opened in 1889. When "in the winter of 1889 or 1890" she developed a skin reaction to mercuric chloride that was used for asepsis, William Halsted, soon-to-be her husband, asked the Goodyear Rubber Company to produce thin rubber gloves for her protection. In 1894 Halsted implemented the use of sterilized medical gloves at Johns Hopkins. However, the first modern disposable glove was invented by Ansell Rubber Co. Pty. Ltd. in 1965.

Glove materials

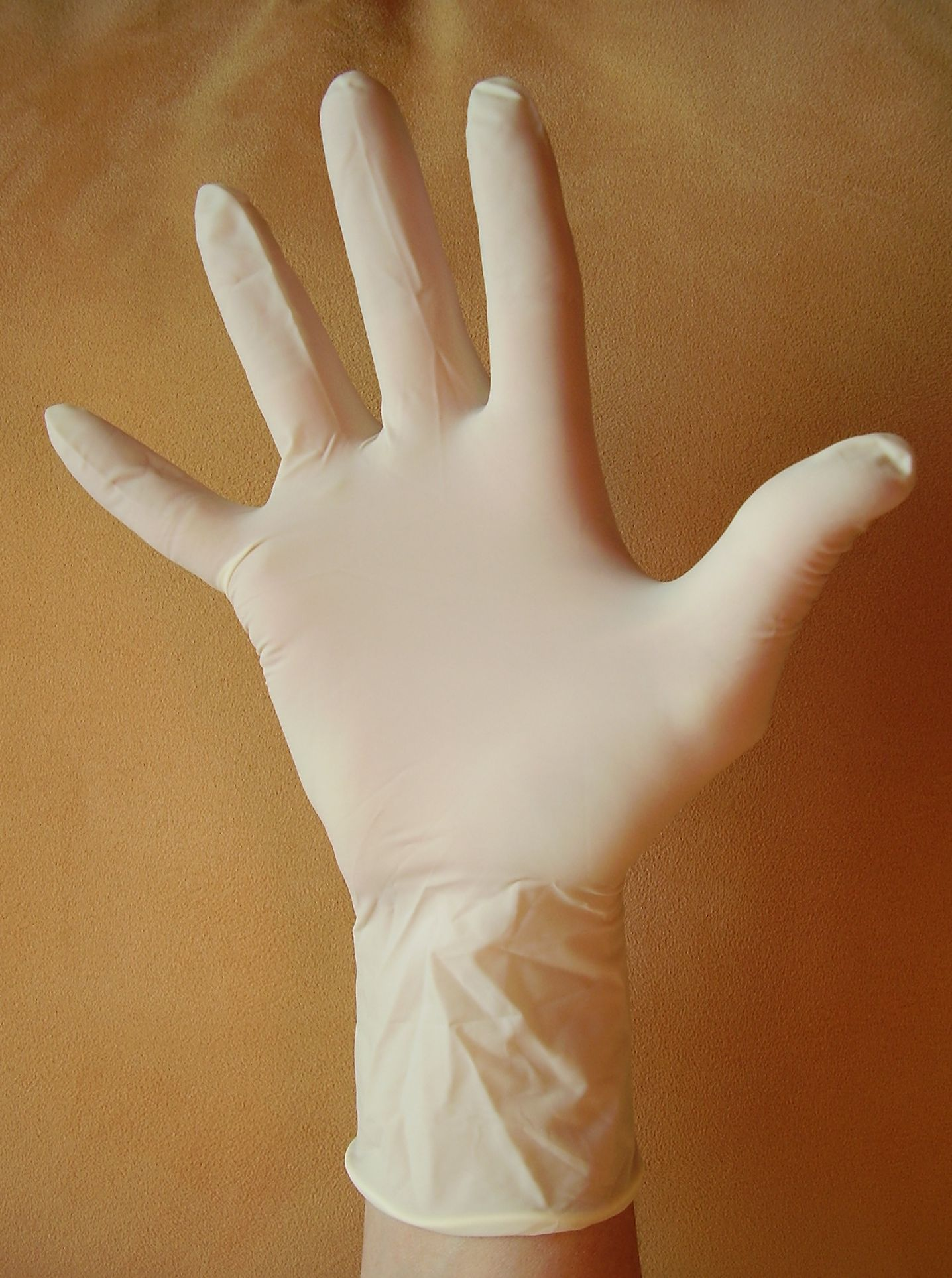
Latex

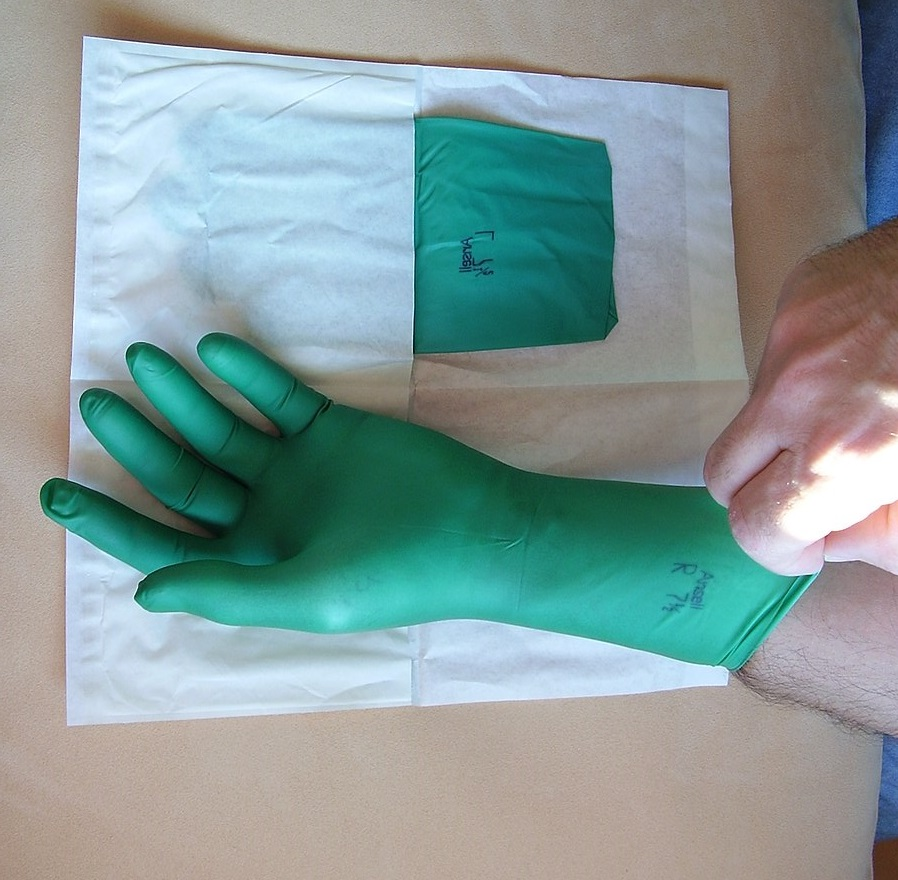
Neoprene

They based the production on the technique for making condoms. These gloves have a range of clinical uses ranging from dealing with human excrement to dental applications. Criminals have also been known to wear medical gloves during commission of crimes. These gloves are often chosen because their thinness and tight fit allow for dexterity. However, because of the thinness of these gloves, fingerprints may actually pass through the material as glove prints, thus transferring the wearer's prints onto the surface touched or handled. The participants of the Watergate burglaries infamously wore rubber surgical gloves in an effort to hide their fingerprints.

== Industry ==
In 2020, the market for medical gloves had a value of more than USD 10.17 billion and, with growing demand (especially in developing countries), is expected to grow by 9.2 per cent per year until 2028. The majority of medical gloves are manufactured in South East Asia, with Malaysia alone accounting for about three quarters of global production in 2020.

=== Labour rights violations ===
There have been several investigations in factories in Malaysia, Thailand and Sri Lanka that documented severe violations of human and labour rights. Both in Malaysia and Thailand migrants represent the majority of workers in hard physical labour. They are frequently recruited by specialized agencies in their less affluent home countries such as Nepal and are often charged with high recruitment fees forcing them into debt bondage. There are documented cases in which employees' passports were withheld by their employers leaving them especially vulnerable to exploitation.

In 2010, for instance, Swedwatch, a Swedish labour right NGO examining a Malaysian factory, reported that most employees were working 12 hours per day seven days a week without overtime pay or payslip, harassment of workers by the management, safety deficits and poor hygienic conditions in employee housing.

Reacting to these findings, from October 2019 to March 2020, the US Department of Labor listed medical gloves produced in Malaysia on the List of Goods Produced by Child Labor or Forced Labor and temporarily banned the import of gloves produced by the Malaysian company Top Glove, the world's largest manufacturer at the time.

== Sizing ==
Generally speaking, examination gloves are sized in XS, S, M and L. Some brands may offer size XL. Surgical gloves are usually sized more precisely since they are worn for a much longer period of time and require exceptional dexterity. The sizing of surgical gloves are based on the measured circumference around the palm (excluding the thumb) in inches, at a level slightly above the thumb's sewn. Typical sizing ranges from 5.5 to 9.0 at an increment of 0.5. Some brands may also offer size 5.0. First-time users of surgical gloves may take some time to find the right size and brand that suit their hand geometry the most.

People with a thicker palm may need a size larger than the measurement and vice versa. Sizing should be one of the first things to look for. Dexterity is essential for every worker and wearing the wrong size of glove can have a huge impact on someone's work. Wearing the right size of glove can also increase comfort, which can influence workers to wear their assigned PPE. Research on a group of American surgeons found that the most common surgical glove size for men is 7.0, followed by 6.5; and for women 6.0 followed by 5.5.

== Powdered gloves ==
To facilitate donning of gloves, powders have been used as lubricants. Early powders derived from pines or club moss were found to be toxic. Talcum powder was used for decades but linked to postoperative granuloma and scar formation. Corn starch, another agent used as lubricant, was also found to have potential side effects such as inflammatory reactions and granuloma and scar formation.

=== Elimination of powdered medical gloves ===
With the availability of non-powdered medical gloves that were easy to don, calls for the elimination of powdered gloves became louder. By 2016, healthcare systems in Germany and the United Kingdom had eliminated their use. In March 2016, the United States Food and Drug Administration (FDA) issued a proposal to ban their medical use and on December 19, 2016 passed a rule banning all powdered gloves intended for medical use. The rule became effective on January 18, 2017. Powder-free medical gloves are used in medical cleanroom environments, where the need for cleanliness is often similar to that in a sensitive medical environment.

=== Chlorination ===
To make them easier to don without the use of powder, gloves can be treated with chlorine. Chlorination affects some of the beneficial properties of latex, but also reduces the quantity of allergenic latex proteins.

=== Polymer coating ===
On the market, it is a wide range of applications for polymer coatings in the market. Most of the current disposable gloves are powdered. These coatings include several polymers: silicone, acrylic resins, and gels that make gloves easier to wear. This process is currently used in nitrile gloves and latex gloves.

== Alternatives to latex ==
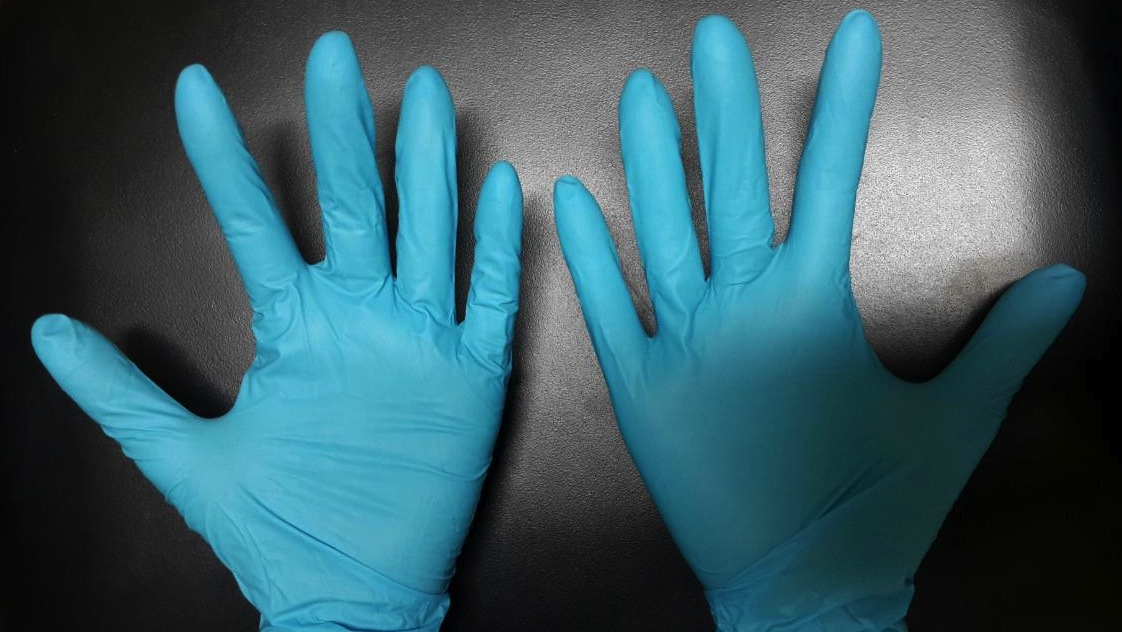
Nitrile powder free gloves

Due to the increasing rate of latex allergy among health professionals, and in the general population, gloves made of non-latex materials such as polyvinyl chloride, nitrile rubber, or neoprene have become widely used. Chemical processes may be employed to reduce the amount of antigenic protein in Hevea latex, resulting in alternative natural-rubber-based materials such Vytex Natural Rubber Latex. However, non-latex gloves have not yet replaced latex gloves in surgical procedures, as gloves made of alternative materials generally do not fully match the fine control or greater sensitivity to touch available with latex surgical gloves.

(High-grade isoprene gloves are the only exception to this rule, as they have the same chemical structure as natural latex rubber. However, fully artificial polyisoprene—rather than "hypoallergenic" cleaned natural latex rubber—is also the most expensive natural latex substitute available.) Other high-grade non-latex gloves, such as nitrile gloves, can cost over twice the price of their latex counterparts, a fact that has often prevented switching to these alternative materials in cost-sensitive environments, such as many hospitals. Nitrile is more resistant to tearing than natural latex, and is more resistant to many chemicals. Sulfur compounds used as accelerants to cure nitrile can speed the tarnishing process in silver, so accelerant-free nitrile or other gloves must be used when handling objects made of these metals when this is not acceptable.

== Double gloving ==
Double gloving is the practice of wearing two layers of medical gloves to reduce the danger of infection from glove failure or penetration of the gloves by sharp objects during medical procedures. Surgeons double glove when operating on individuals bearing infectious agents such as HIV and hepatitis, and to better protect patients against infections possibly transmitted by the surgeon. A systematic review of the literature has shown double gloving to offer significantly more protection against inner glove perforation in surgical procedures compared to the use of a single glove layer. But it was unclear if there was better protection against infections transmitted by the surgeon. Another systematic review studied if double gloving protected the surgeon better against infections transmitted by the patient.

Pooled results of 12 studies (RCTs) with 3,437 participants showed that double gloving reduced the number of perforations in inner gloves with 71% compared to single gloving. On average ten surgeons/nurses involved in 100 operations sustain 172 single gloves perforations but with double gloves only 50 inner gloves would be perforated. This is a considerable reduction of the risk. In addition, cotton gloves can be worn under the single-use gloves to reduce the amount of sweat produced when wearing these gloves for a long period of time. These under gloves can be disinfected and used again.

== See also ==
- Latex allergy
- Needlestick injury
