= William Stewart Halsted =

American surgeon (1852–1922)

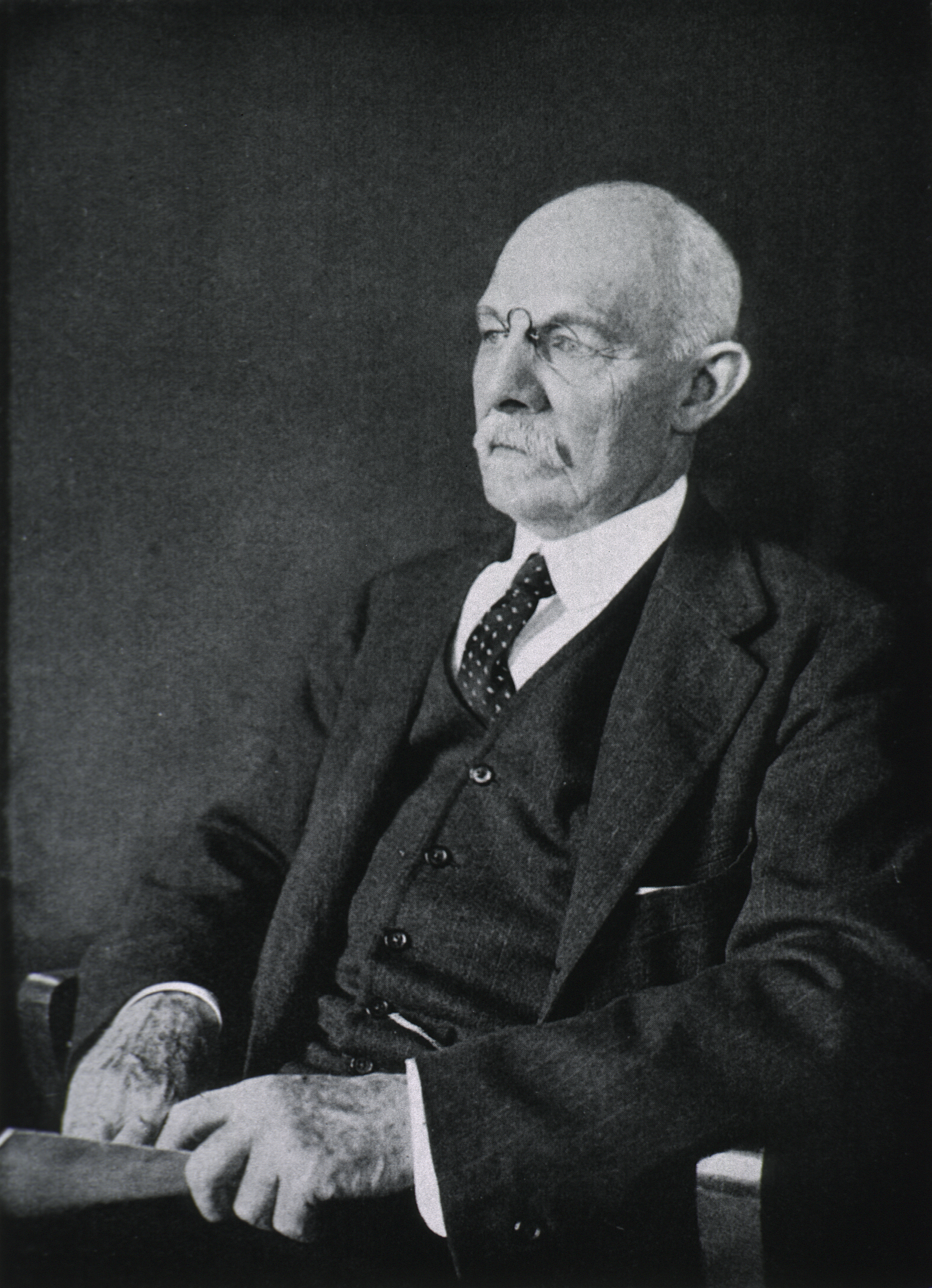
- Halsted in 1922
- Born: September 23, 1852; New York City, U.S.
- Died: September 7, 1922 (aged 69); Baltimore, Maryland, U.S.
- Education: Yale University (BA); Columbia University (MD)
- Known for: Inventing the residency training system in U.S.; Mastectomy; Introduced rubber surgical gloves
- Scientific career
- Fields: Medicine
- Workplaces: Johns Hopkins Hospital

William Stewart Halsted, M.D. (September 23, 1852 – September 7, 1922) was an American surgeon who emphasized strict aseptic technique during surgical procedures, was an early champion of newly discovered anesthetics, and introduced several new operations, including the radical mastectomy for breast cancer. Along with William Osler (Professor of Medicine), Howard Atwood Kelly (Professor of Gynecology) and William H. Welch (Professor of Pathology), Halsted was one of the "Big Four" founding professors at the Johns Hopkins Hospital. His operating room at Johns Hopkins Hospital is in Ward G, and was described as a small room where medical discoveries and miracles took place. According to an intern who once worked in Halsted's operating room, Halsted had unique techniques, operated on the patients with great confidence and often had perfect results which astonished the interns. His development of the surgical residency at Hopkins marked the first of its kind in North America, but its strict pyramidal structure and hierarchical environment were later criticized by surgeons such as Edward Churchill.

Throughout his professional life, he was addicted to cocaine and later also to morphine, which were not illegal during his time. As revealed by Osler's diary, Halsted developed a high level of drug tolerance for morphine. He was "never able to reduce the amount to less than three grains daily" (approximately 200 mg). Halsted's addictions resulted from experiments on the use of cocaine as an anesthetic agent that he performed on himself.

== Early life ==
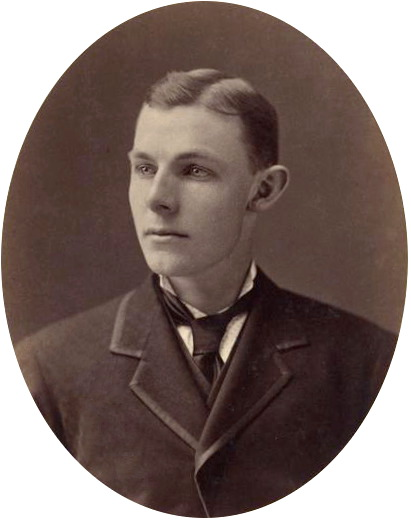
Halsted in 1874

William S. Halsted was born on September 23, 1852, in New York City. His mother was Mary Louisa Haines and his father William Mills Halsted, Jr. He was the oldest of four children. His father was a businessman with Halsted, Haines and Company which was an organization that supplied dry goods. William Halsted, Jr. was very involved in the community. William S. Halsted's family was of English heritage and was very wealthy with two homes in the state of New York. One of their homes was on Fifth Avenue in New York City and the other was an estate in Westchester County, New York. Though raised a Presbyterian, Halsted was an agnostic by adulthood. Halsted was educated at home by tutors until 1862, when he was sent to boarding school in Monson, Massachusetts at age ten. He didn't like his new school and even ran away at one point. He was later enrolled at Phillips Academy in Andover, Massachusetts, where he graduated in 1869. Halsted entered Yale College after a year of studying at home. At Yale, Halsted was captain of the football team, played baseball and rowed on the crew team, but his academic achievements were below average. One of his social setbacks was in his senior year when he wasn't accepted into the prestigious Skull and Bones secret society. At the end of his senior year at Yale, a newfound interest in medicine seemed to arise. Halsted attended medical lectures at Yale Medical School and studied books on the subjects of anatomy and physiology.

== Medical education ==
Upon graduation from Yale in 1874, Halsted entered Columbia University College of Physicians and Surgeons. Historians are not certain why Halsted attended medical school. Some believe he was inspired by his father's involvement with medical organizations. Others think he couldn't imagine himself in the family business. Once he entered medical school, he left his early academic difficulties behind him. Physicians central to his emergence as a medical scholar include Henry B Sands, a well-known surgeon, who was Halsted's tutor during this time. Halsted served as assistant to Professor of Physiology John Call Dalton, another influence. During medical school, Halsted worked in a pharmacy in his free time. After two years of medical school, Halsted started to burn out. He complained about his memory not working correctly among other things so during the summer of his second year he went to Block Island in Rhode Island. Here, he studied while participating in activities like fishing and sailing. He then took a competitive exam to apply for an internship at Bellevue Hospital in New York even though this program was only open to students with medical degrees. Halsted did very well on the exam and was awarded the internship for House Surgeon at Bellevue where he remained for a year.

Halsted spent most of his internship in the medical wards but also helped with some surgical operations. The conditions in the hospital were very unsanitary; bleeding patients was a common practice during this time, and surgical tools weren't as well cared for as they are modernly. Interns ran around the hospital with buckets full of pus from the patients. During the internship, Halsted was introduced to the use of antiseptic through physicians using Joseph Lister's technique created in 1867. This sparked an interest in Halsted, and he helped with the issue of infections at Bellevue during the rest of the internship. He ended his academic career in the top ten of his medical school class. He then participated in a competition that placed him at the top of his class. He graduated in 1877 with a Doctor of Medicine degree.

== Medical career ==
After graduation, Halsted joined the New York Hospital as house physician in April 1878, where he introduced the hospital chart which tracks the patient's temperature, pulse and respiration. It was at New York Hospital that Halsted met the pathologist William H. Welch, who would become his closest friend. He left New York Hospital in October 1878.

Halsted had exhausted all of the medical training opportunities the United States had to offer in his position, for there was no program to train recent medical school graduates for a career in medicine at this time. Halsted then went to Europe to study under the tutelage of several prominent surgeons and scientists, including Edoardo Bassini, Ernst von Bergmann, Theodor Billroth, Heinrich Braun, Hans Chiari, Friedrich von Esmarch, Albert von Kölliker, Jan Mikulicz-Radecki, Max Schede, Adolph Stöhr, Richard von Volkmann, Anton Wölfler, Emil Zuckerkandl. He became especially close to Anton Woelfler among others which gave him unlimited access to resources. The relationships Halsted forged with these future leaders in their fields would last a lifetime. During this time in Europe, cancer was just starting to be studied more widely, making the timing of his arrival ideal. This experience inspired him with multiple new medical ideas and practices that he would contribute to in the United States.

Halsted returned to New York in 1880 and for the next six years led an extraordinarily vigorous and energetic life. Like when Halsted visited Europe, it was an opportune time for Halsted's involvement because surgery was on the brink of various important discoveries. He operated at multiple hospitals including the Chambers Street Hospital, College of Physicians and Surgeons where he was Assistant Demonstrator in Anatomy, Charity Hospital, Bellevue Hospital and Roosevelt Hospital (currently Mount Sinai West) where he was a visiting physician at all three, and the State Emigrant Hospital on Ward's Island where he was Surgeon-in-Chief. At Bellevue Hospital, he convinced the hospital to erect a tent that was used as his surgical area where he could practice the idea of antiseptic surgery. This project cost $10,000 at the time. Halsted also started teaching, but he greatly strayed from classical teaching methods. He reformed the classroom by creating a more hands-on experience coupled with theory for his students who were generally at the top of their classes. He was an extremely popular, inspiring and charismatic teacher due to this. In 1882 he performed one of the first gallbladder operations in the United States, a cholecystotomy performed on his mother on the kitchen table at 2 am in which he removed seven gallstones. His mother completely recovered. Halsted also performed one of the first emergency blood transfusions in the United States. He had been called to see his sister after she had given birth. He found her moribund from blood loss, and in a bold move withdrew his own blood, transfused his blood into his sister, and then operated on her to save her life. Because of these operations, Halsted became known for being bold, and his reputation as a surgeon was gradually increasing.

In 1884, Halsted read a report by the Austrian ophthalmologist Karl Koller, describing the anesthetic power of cocaine when instilled on the surface of the eye. Halsted, his students, and fellow physicians experimented on each other, and demonstrated that cocaine could produce safe and effective local anesthesia when applied topically and when injected. Halsted would also inject himself with the drug to test it before using it on his patients during surgeries. In the process, Halsted and some of his other colleagues became addicted to the drug. Halsted and Dr. Richard Hall were the only colleagues who became addicted that would survive their cocaine problems. Halsted maintained an active career while dealing with his addiction for five years. However, there were some clues to his condition during this time. Halsted published an article in 1885 in the New York Medical Journal, and it was incoherent. This showcased what state Halsted was in with his addiction to cocaine. His close friend Harvey Firestone recognized the gravity of the situation, and arranged for Halsted to be abducted and put aboard a steamer headed for Europe. In the two weeks it took to complete the voyage, Halsted underwent an early, crude form of detoxification. Upon his return to the United States he became addicted again, and voluntarily admitted himself to Butler Sanatorium in Providence, Rhode Island, where they attempted to cure his cocaine addiction with morphine. He was there for seven months. Even though he remained dependent upon morphine for the remainder of his life, he continued his career as a pioneering surgeon; many of his innovations remain standard operating room procedures. However, his addiction to cocaine ended his medical career in New York City.

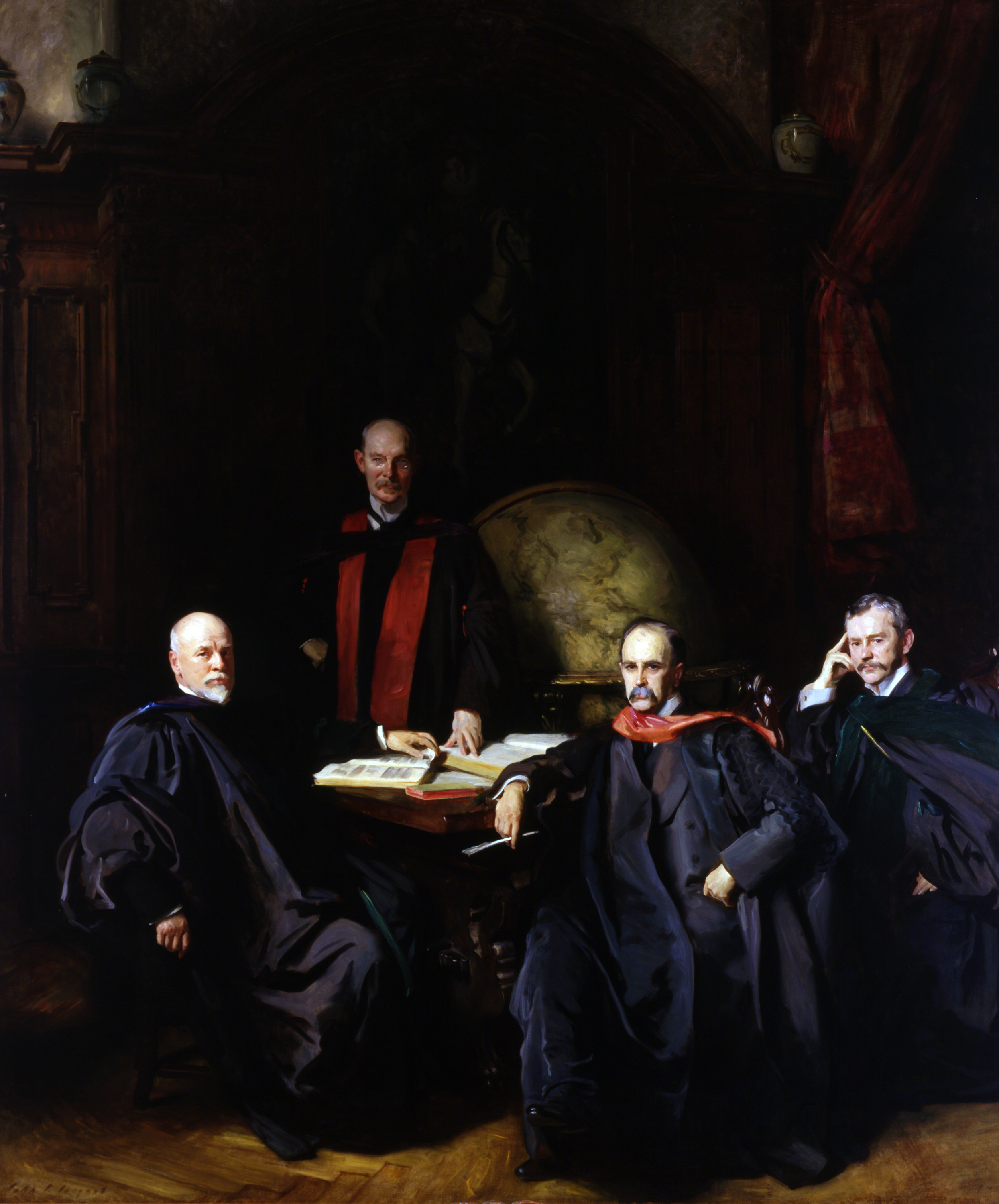
The four doctors: Osler, Halsted, Welch, and Kelly

Following his discharge from Butler in 1886, Halsted moved to Baltimore, Maryland, to join his friend William Welch in organizing and launching the new Johns Hopkins Hospital. Halsted began working in Welch's experimental laboratory, and he presented a paper at Harvard Medical School. Soon thereafter, he was readmitted to Butler Hospital and remained there for nine months. He returned to Baltimore thereafter. When Johns Hopkins University Hospital opened in May 1889, he became Head of the Outpatient Department, acting Surgeon to the hospital, and Associate Professor of Surgery after being recommended by Welch when the first choice for the position fell through. These lesser positions alluded to the fact that the administration was still worried about Halsted's past cocaine addiction. In 1890, he was appointed Surgeon-in-Chief of the hospital. In 1892, Halsted joined Welch, William Osler, and Howard Kelly in founding the Johns Hopkins School of Medicine, and was appointed its first Professor of Surgery. Compared to his teaching in New York, Halsted's teaching was declining. He would pay attention to specific students and ignore the rest. However, he would also give certain residents that worked under him unprecedented learning experiences because of the amount of responsibility he awarded them. During these years at Johns Hopkins, he is credited with multiple achievements in the surgical world.

== Achievements ==
Halsted was credited with starting the first formal surgical residency training program in the United States at Johns Hopkins. He based this mainly on the ideas that he obtained in Europe, especially those of the Germans, Austrians, and Swiss. This was the foundation for the residency training programs in place today. The program began with an internship of undefined length (individuals advanced once Halsted believed they were ready for the next level of training), followed by six years as an assistant resident, and then two years as house surgeon. This program was also developed to create role models and teachers for the next generation of surgeons. Halsted trained many of the prominent academic surgeons of the time, including Harvey Williams Cushing and Walter Dandy, founders of the surgical subspecialty of neurosurgery; and Hugh H. Young, a founder of the specialty of urology. His methods of training surgeons spread, first to the rest of Baltimore and then throughout the United States. Many prominent figures in medical surgery were affected and influenced by his new system of training, and it has had a profound impact on American medicine.

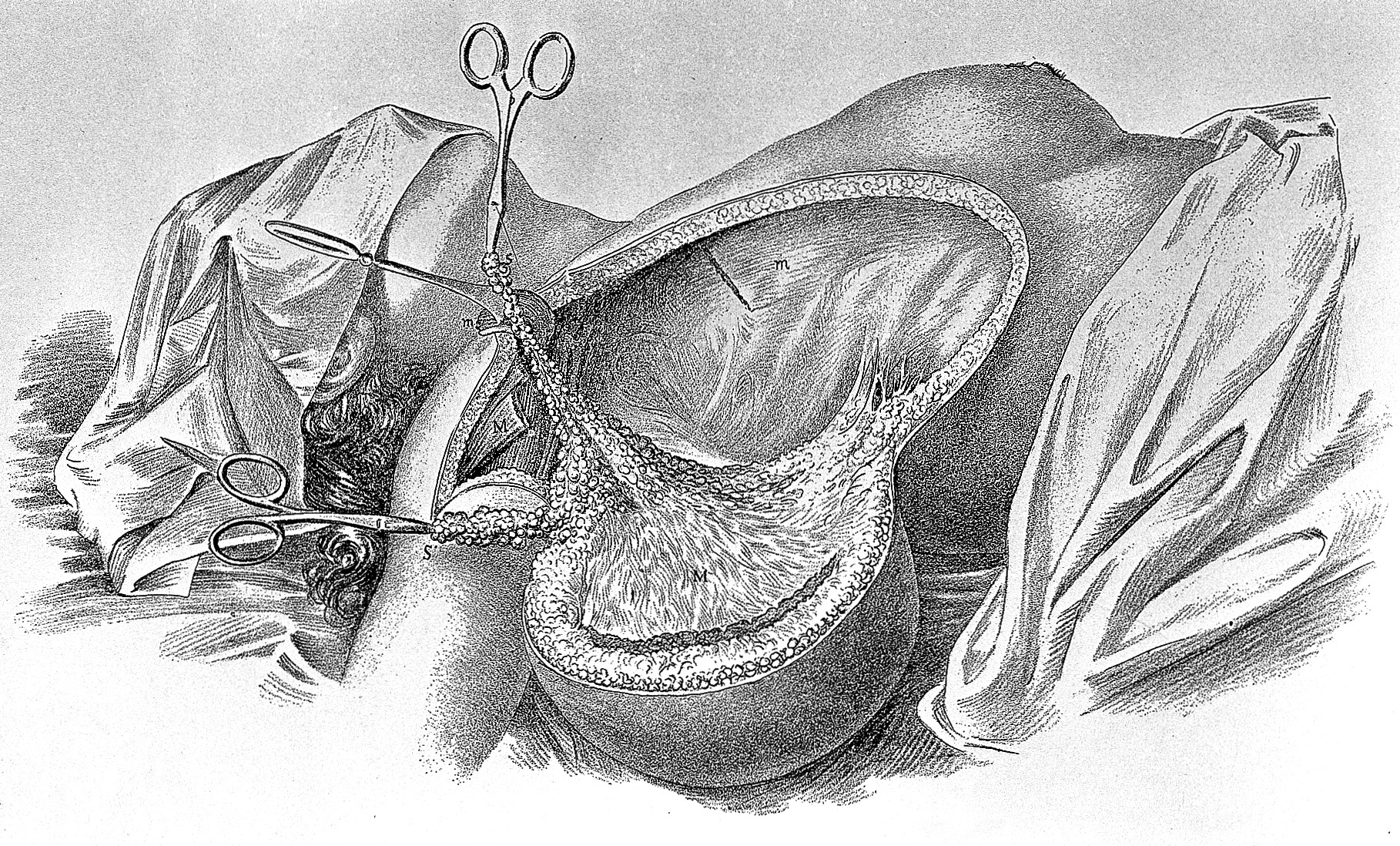
Radical mastectomy

Halsted held the belief that cancers spread through the bloodstream, which led him to think that sufficient local removal of the tumor would cure the cancer. This belief led him to perform the first radical mastectomy for breast cancer in the U.S. at Roosevelt Hospital in New York in 1882, an operation first performed in France a century earlier by Bernard Peyrilhe (1735-1804). Halsted had observed a German surgeon perform increasingly aggressive surgeries to remove cancerous tumors from the breast, but the patients still relapsed even with this more aggressive surgery. An English surgeon, Charles Moore, believed that even more breast tissue should be removed and doctors who were trying to save women from disfigurement were doing them a disservice. Halsted took this to the next level, eventually resorting to removing the pectoralis major, lymph nodes near the collar bone, and lymph nodes near the armpit. Some surgeons in Europe even removed ribs from women with breast cancer. This caused great disfigurement of the women operated on. Halsted presented his findings at the American Surgical Association conference in New Orleans in 1898, concluding that the procedure significantly decreased the percentage of local reoccurrence. He also presented more findings in 1907, showing the same results. In the years since Halsted's research, the radical mastectomy has come under fire. It is now known that survival from breast cancer is more closely related to how much the cancer has spread before surgery than how much is removed during surgery.

Halsted created multiple techniques for surgery so damage to tissues and blood supply would be minimized. Some of these new advances included different types of forceps, sutures, and ligatures. Besides working on breast cancer, Halsted also contributed to the surgical treatment for other diseases including vascular aneurysm, inguinal hernia, and a certain kind of primary carcinoma of the ampulla of Vater. In addition, he helped develop anesthesia, an integral part of modern surgery. As one of the first proponents of hemostasis and investigators of wound healing, Halsted pioneered Halsted's principles, modern surgical principles of control of bleeding, accurate anatomical dissection, complete sterility, exact approximation of tissue in wound closures without excessive tightness, and gentle handling of tissues.

Halsted was also involved in the introduction of rubber gloves into the operating room for surgery in 1889. The main reason for the introduction of rubber gloves was to protect the hands of scrub nurse Caroline Hampton. She suffered from contact dermatitis and painful eczema as a result of the antiseptics used, so Halsted arranged for Goodyear Rubber Company to make "bespoke" rubber gloves for her. Caroline Hampton would later give up her job as a nurse to become Halsted's wife. Although the use of gloves wasn't originally championed for sanitary reasons, such gloves drastically increased the cleanliness of operations, as was later demonstrated by Joseph Colt Bloodgood.

Other achievements included advances in thyroid, biliary tract, hernia, intestinal and arterial aneurysm surgery.

H.L. Mencken considered Halsted the greatest physician of the whole Johns Hopkins group, and Mencken's praise of his achievements when he reviewed Dr. MacCallum's 1930 biography is a memorable tribute. "His contributions to surgery were numerous and various. He introduced the use of local anesthetics, he was the first to put on rubber gloves, and he devised many new and ingenious operations. But his chief service was rather more general, and hard to describe. It was to bring in a new and better way of regarding the patient. Antisepsis and asepsis, coming in when he was young, had turned the attention of surgeons to external and often extraneous things. Fighting germs, they tended to forget the concrete sick man on the table. Dr. Halsted changed all that. He showed that manhandled tissues, though they could not yell, could yet suffer and die. He studied the natural recuperative powers of the body, and showed how they could be made to help the patient. He stood against reckless slashing, and taught that a surgeon must walk very warily. Dr. William Mayo, one of the cofounders of the Mayo Clinic, once commented that Dr. Halsted took so long to perform procedures that the patients usually healed before he had a chance to close the incision. Though, like most men of his craft, he had no religion, he yet revived and reinforced the ancient saying of Ambroise Paré: 'God cured him; I assisted.' Above all, he was a superb teacher, though he never formally taught. The young men who went out from his operating room were magnificently trained, and are among the great ornaments of American surgery today."

== Personal life ==
In 1890, Halsted married Caroline Hampton, the niece of Wade Hampton III, a former general in the Confederate States Army and also a former Governor of South Carolina. They purchased the High Hampton mountain retreat in North Carolina from Caroline's three aunts. There, Halsted raised dahlias and pursued his hobby of astronomy; he and his wife had no children. He died on September 7, 1922, 16 days short of his 70th birthday, from bronchopneumonia as a complication of surgery for gallstones and cholangitis.

== Eponyms ==
- Halsted's law: transplanted tissue will grow only if there is a lack of that tissue in the host
- Halsted's operation I: operation for inguinal hernia
- Halsted's operation II: radical mastectomy for breast cancer
- Halsted's sign: a medical sign for breast cancer
- Halsted's suture: a mattress suture for wounds that produced less scarring
- Halsted mosquito forceps: a type of hemostat
- Halsted ligament (Costoclavicular ligament): it is formed from dense condensation of clavipectoral fascia

== Works ==
- — (1885). "Practical comments on the use and abuse of cocaine". The New York Medical Journal. 42: 294–95.
- — (1887). "Practical Circular suture of the intestines; an experimental study". The American Journal of the Medical Sciences. 94: 436–61. doi:10.1097/00000441-188710000-00010.
- — (1890–1891). "The treatment of wounds with especial reference to the value of the blood clot in the management of dead spaces". Johns Hopkins Hospital Bulletin. 2: 255–314. (First mention of rubber gloves in the operating room)
- — (1892). "Ligation of the first portion of the left subclavian artery and excision of a subclavio-axillary aneurism". The Johns Hopkins Hospital Bulletin. 3: 93–4.
- — (1894–1895). "The results of operations for the cure of cancer of the breast performed at the Johns Hopkins Hospital from June, 1899, to January, 1894". The Johns Hopkins Hospital Bulletin. 4: 297.
- — (1899). "The Contribution to the surgery of the bile passages, especially of the common bile-duct". The Boston Medical and Surgical Journal. 141 (26): 645–54. doi:10.1056/nejm189912281412601.
- — (March 1, 1909). "Partial, Progressive and Complete Occlusion of the Aorta and Other Large Arteries in the Dog by Means of the Metal Band". The Journal of Experimental Medicine. 11 (2): 373–91. doi:10.1084/jem.11.2.373. PMC 2124707. PMID 19867254.
- — (1915). "A diagnostic sign of gelatinous carcinoma of the breast". Journal of the American Medical Association. 64 (20): 1653. doi:10.1001/jama.1915.02570460029011.
- — (1925). "Auto- and isotransplantation, in dogs, of the parathyroid glandules". Journal of Experimental Medicine. 63 (1): 395–438. doi:10.1084/jem.11.1.175. PMC 2124704. PMID 19867240.
- Burket, Walter C., ed. (1924). Surgical Papers by William Stewart Halsted (1852-1922). Baltimore: Johns Hopkins Press.

== See also ==
- The Knick
