= Caroline Hampton =

American nurse (1861–1922)

- Born: November 20, 1861
- Died: November 27, 1922 (aged 61)
- Medical career
- Profession: Nurse
- Institutions: Mount Sinai Hospital, New York Hospital, Johns Hopkins Hospital

Caroline Hampton Halsted (November 20, 1861 – November 27, 1922) was an American nurse who became the first to use medical gloves in the operating room.

== Biography ==
Caroline Hampton was a member of a prominent southern U.S. family; her uncle, Wade Hampton III, was a Confederate general, governor of South Carolina, and a US senator. Her mother, Sally (Baxter) Hampton died in 1862 of tuberculosis. Her father, Colonel Frank Hampton, died at the Battle of Brandy Station in early 1863 during the American Civil War. Their family home Millwood was burned, and Hampton was raised by three aunts, with the expectation that she would marry well, ideally to a southern plantation owner.

Against her family's wishes, she went to nursing school in New York. She trained first at Mount Sinai Hospital and then at New York Hospital, graduating in 1888. In 1889 she became chief surgical nurse at Johns Hopkins Hospital in Baltimore, working for William Stewart Halsted.

== Rubber gloves ==
The impetus for Hampton's use of gloves was her sensitive skin. Previously she had to wear gloves when gardening, and the procedures at the hospital caused her to develop severe contact dermatitis and painful eczema. Halsted, as a supporter of the germ theory of disease, used strict hygienic measures in his operating theater. People had to cleanse their hands using soap, followed by a caustic solution of potassium permanganate, a hot oxalic acid bath, and a mercury chloride compound. In the winter of 1889 Caroline Hampton informed Halsted of her intention to resign due to the effects on her hands.

Halsted considered Hampton an “unusually efficient” operating room assistant. He suggested that she try coating her hands in a gelatinous substance called collodion. It hardened but tended to crack. Next Halsted sent plaster casts of Caroline's hands to the Goodyear Rubber Company of New York, and ordered two pairs of bespoke rubber gloves to cover her hands and forearms. The resulting gloves were thin, flexible, and reusable, and protected Hampton's hands.

Halsted was surprised to return from an extended vacation and find that others in the operating room had also adopted rubber gloves, following Caroline's example. The gloves protected the medical staff's hands, and surgical assistants reported that the textured surface of the gloves made it easier to hold onto slippery surgical instruments. That they also protected patients was discovered by one of Halsted's surgical residents, Joseph Colt Bloodgood. In 1899, Bloodgood published results showing that use of gloves during surgery reduced postsurgical infection rates from 17% to less than 2%, a staggering effect.

== Marriage ==
Caroline Hampton and William Halsted were married on June 4, 1890, at Trinity Episcopal Church, Columbia, South Carolina. Caroline, as a married woman, was required to resign from her job at the hospital. Caroline ran their household during the winter, and their farm High Hampton in North Carolina during the summer.

Caroline suffered later in life from migraines, and it is suspected that she, as well as her husband, may have used morphine.

Both were known for their eccentricity. Anecdotes about their modes of entertaining, attachment to pets and marital life amused local society.
