= Bernard Peyrilhe =

French surgeon

- Born: 1737; Pompignan, France
- Died: 1804 (aged 66–67)
- Known for: Pioneering cancer research and surgery
- Scientific career
- Fields: Oncology

Bernard Peyrilhe (1735–1804) was a French surgeon, known as one of the founders of experimental cancer research. Peyrilhe was born in Pompignan, and became a lecturer at the Paris School of Surgery (École de Chirurgie).

In 1773, Peyrilhe was studying for a PhD, when he wrote the first systematic review of cancer in a prize-winning essay which he submitted to the Academy of Letters and Fine Arts in Lyon in response to an essay competition entitled What is Cancer?. His essay covered the nature of the disease, its growth, treatment, and how a "virus" produced by the tumor caused wasting (cachexia). At the time, the term "virus" meant any substance which came from an animal's body and which could transmit a disease. Peyrilhe attempted to demonstrate this virus, by injecting an emulsion of fluid from a human breast cancer into a wound he had created on the back of a dog. He kept the dog at his home to observe it, but the dog developed an abscess at the injection site and howled so much that Peyrilhe's servants drowned it. As is now understood, the transfer of cancerous tissue between species is generally unsuccessful, as the recipient's immune system recognizes cells from a different species as foreign, and destroys them (a graft-versus-host interaction).

Also in 1773, Peyrihle was the first surgeon to treat breast cancer by radical mastectomy which included both the pectoral muscle and axillary lymph nodes. He considered that the risks of amputating the pectoral muscle were outweighed by the otherwise certain outcome of death.

Peyrilhe also successfully treated ulceration with carbolic acid, which was, at the time, a recently discovered acid.

== Works ==
- Peyrilhe, Bernard (1774). Dissertatio Academica de Cancro [A dissertation on cancerous diseases] (in Latin). J.J.G. De Marcour.
- Peyrilhe, Bernard (1786). Remède nouveau contre les maladies vénériennes [New cure for venereal diseases] (in French). Chez Didot le jeune, Barrois le jeune.
