= Fingerprint powder =

Chemical compound used to lift fingerprints from surfaces

Fingerprint powders are fine powders used, in conjunction with fingerprint brushes, by crime scene investigators and other law enforcement personnel to search for and enhance latent/invisible fingerprints that can be used to determine identification. This method of fingerprint development commonly referred to as dusting for fingerprints, involves the adherence of the powder particles to the moisture and sweat secretions deposited on to surfaces by the raised ridges on fingers, palms, or soles of feet designed for grip, called friction ridges. Furrows, representing the recessed areas, which lack fingerprint residue, do not retain the powder.

Physical development of fingerprints using powders is one of many methods that can be employed to enhance fingerprints. It is typically used to search for fingerprints on large non-porous surfaces that cannot be submitted for chemical development within a laboratory. This particular method is best suited for the enhancement of freshly deposited fingerprints, because the adherence of the powder is diminished when the impression residue has dried.

Fingerprint powders are commonly used because of the versatility associated with this technique. There is a large selection of fingerprint powder compositions that have evolved, over time, to enable the safe and effective use of fingerprint powders on a wide range of backgrounds.

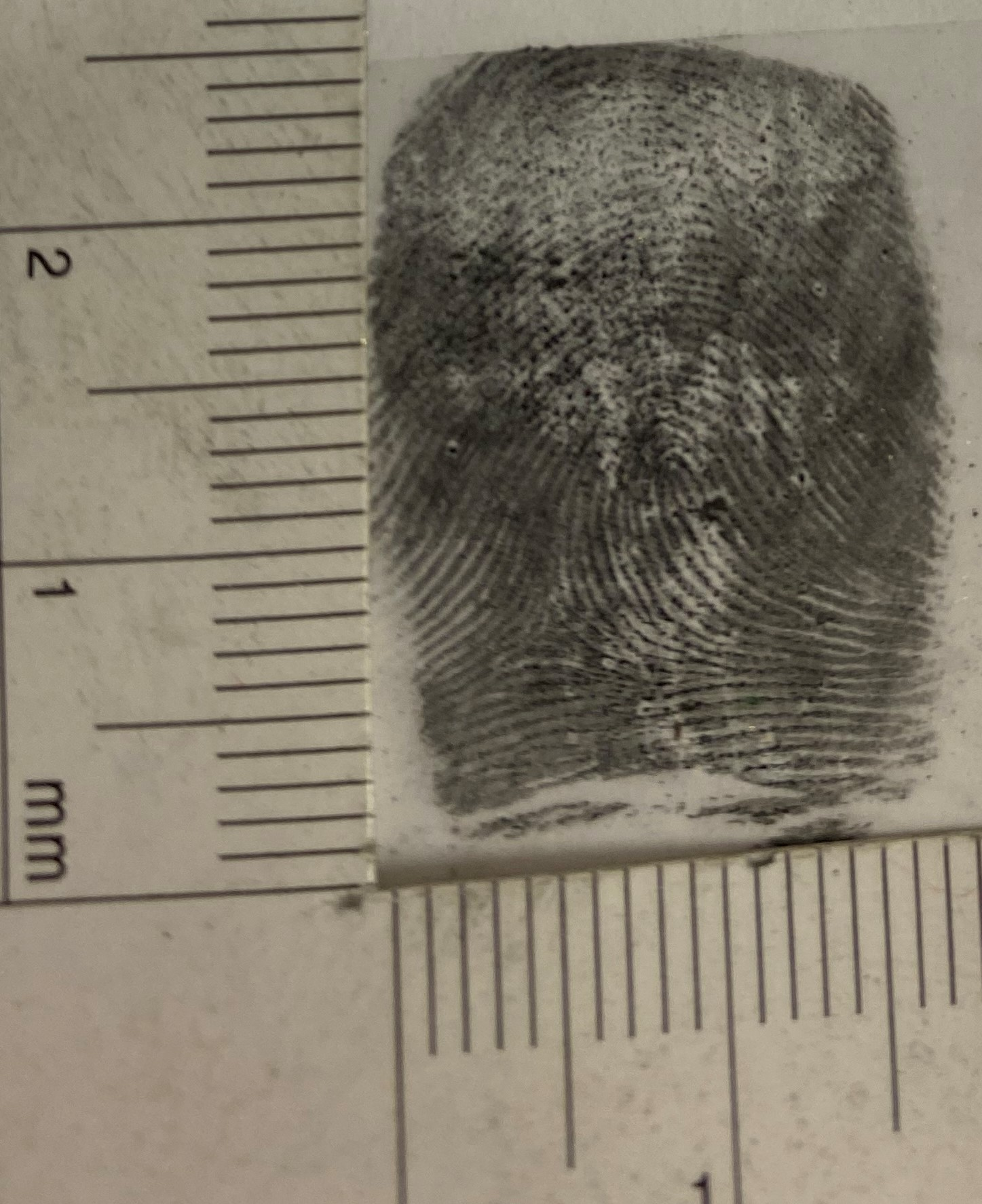
A fingerprint developed using magnetic powder, with a measurement scale

== Composition ==
In general, two components are present in dry non-magnetic fingerprint powders: a colour, typically inorganic in nature, and a material for adhesion within the powder such as stearic acid, cornstarch or Lycopodium powder, the spores of the Lycopodium and other related plants. A filler material such as mesh pumice is often added to keep the colour and adhesion material together, while preventing the formation of large clumps within the powder that would result in ineffective application onto the surface.

Modern fingerprint powders are plentiful and include both dry and aqueous options. The dry fingerprint powders are often categorized into six basic types based on the general composition. Some powders may belong to more than a single group. These dry powders can be added to a dilute detergent solution that can be applied to surfaces to develop fingerprints.

=== Flake powders ===
Flake powders are composed of metal particles. The most common metal material used in this type of powder is aluminum. bronze, gold, copper, iron, and zinc are often used as well. Aluminum powder shows up on a variety of surfaces and is a particularly popular powder choice in the United Kingdom.

=== Granular powders ===
Granular powders were invented in the 1920s as one of the first types of fingerprint powders available. The materials used to make these powders were chalk, lamp black, graphite and a variety of lead and mercury components. Modern granular powders do not use lead or mercury because they have been known to cause health complications with prolonged use. Black granular powders, commonly used in the United States of America, are now composed of carbon-based particles. A wide range of colours are available to provide contrast with many backgrounds.

=== Magnetic powders ===
The foundation of magnetic powders is granular or flake powder, of any colour. The magnetic aspect is from the addition of small iron particles. Magnetic powders enhance fingerprint details more effectively than traditional granular and flake powders, because the particles are finer and the method of application is less invasive.

=== Fluorescent powders ===
Fluorescent powders are available in both granular and magnetic compositions. The fluorescent component is provided by adding a colour dye to the powder to allow for better visualization of dusted fingerprints on multi-coloured surfaces, with the use of ultra-violet (UV) light or an alternate light source (ALS).

=== Nanopowders ===
Nanopowders are a relatively new type of powder composed of nanoparticles. Similar to magnetic powders, these powders provide greater ridge detail in freshly deposited and aged fingerprints due to the extremely small particle size.

=== Infrared powders ===
Infrared powders are used in conjunction with infrared light. The features of the fingerprint are distinguished from the surrounding background because the infrared light is absorbed in the fingerprint rather than reflected. These powders are most beneficial for enhancing fingerprints found on money bills in countries that use polymer currency, because the powder removes issues related to the visualization of fingerprints on items with colourful, reflective and fluorescent properties.

== Factors influencing fingerprint powder quality ==
There are several factors influencing the effectiveness of fingerprint powders.

=== Particle size and shape ===
The powders with finer particles show greater detail within the fingerprint than powders composed of larger coarse particles. Particles with shapes that provides a larger surface area promote greater adhesion to the fingerprints.

=== Adhesion ===
Effective enhancement of fingerprints relies on the adhesion of the powder to residue composing the fingerprint impression without adherence to the rest of the surface, otherwise the view of the fingerprint will be obscured. Adhesion of the powder particles to the fingerprint residue is partially attributable to the electrostatic attraction between the two. However, the adhesion is mainly guided by the increased contact between the moisture in fingerprints and the powder, and the surface tension.

=== Colour ===
The fingerprint powder must be a suitable colour for the surface in question by providing contrast. The details of fingerprints deposited on light surfaces are best visualized by applying dark or black coloured powders. Conversely, white or grey powders are recommended for enhancing fingerprints found on dark surfaces.

There are powders available that contain elements that provide contrast on all types of surfaces. These powders are advantageous at crime scenes where both light and dark surfaces require fingerprint development because the powder type/colour does not need to be changed between uses.

Multi-coloured surfaces are more complex. Fluorescent powders and additional light sources are required to provide the best contrast in these situations. Carbon dots based powders adopt different colours depending on the wavelength of the incident radiation, minimising background interference for fingerprints found on multicolour surfaces.

=== Consistency ===
The powder should not clump together, because the important identifying details within the fingerprint can become destroyed during the application of the powder.

== Powder selection and application ==
In the past, powders were selected based on personal choice or outlined standard procedures of the associated department or agency. Despite this freedom in the powder selection process, crime scene investigators should ultimately choose powders that provide the best contrast against the surface the fingerprints are deposited on, with consideration for the characteristics of the surface itself.

Most fingerprint powders are applied with a fingerprint brush composed of extremely fine fibers, designed to pick up powder and gently deposit it through a twirling motion onto the fingerprint, to reveal it without removing the delicate residue composing the fingerprint itself. There are many different types of brushes that can be used for applying fingerprint powder. The choice mostly depends on the stage of fingerprint development. For example, feather fingerprint brushes enhance detail within fingerprints located during an initial search, with fingerprint brushes composed of fiberglass fibers. Fingerprint powder may be applied using aerosol methods that do not involve direct contact with the surface.

Magnetic powders differ slightly from traditional powders in the way that they are applied to fingerprints. A magnetic applicator is used in place of a fingerprint brush composed of fibers. The magnet within the applicator attracts the magnetic powder, forming a cluster of powder that can be gently moved across the fingerprint. Once complete, the magnet within the applicator is retracted and the magnetic powder falls off. The benefit to this application method is that no bristles touch the surface, with less potential damage to the print compared to other methods of developing fingerprints.

Regardless of the method chosen to apply fingerprint powder, there must be careful consideration not to apply too much powder, which could ruin the fine details within the fingerprint needed to make an identification. In addition, fingerprints contain DNA that can be used in subsequent forensic DNA analysis and, therefore, it is important to mitigate the risks of DNA contamination when applying fingerprint powder.

== Further applications/uses ==
Fingerprint powder is useful for the detection and collection of latent fingerprints, but that is not all the analysis that can be done. Kaplan-Sandquist, LeBeau, and Miller conducted a study where they tested fingerprint development methods with the MALDI/TOF MS. The fingerprint powder was found to be useful as a MALDI matrix. This instrument can identify many compounds. In the study, fingerprints tested contained known solvent residues. The fingerprint powder along with the MALDI matrix had the highest average detection rates of (88%). Since this study was controlled, it is known that the use of this further application with the MALDI/TOF MS would be effective.

== Associated health concerns ==
Fingerprint powders used in the past contained materials that were considered carcinogenic and toxic. Lead and mercury components were removed from fingerprint powders due to associated cases of mercury and lead poisoning.

Modern fingerprint powders pose significantly fewer health risks because they are composed mainly of organic components. However, there is concern that the small particles within the fingerprint powders may be inhaled and after prolonged exposure can result in the development of lung diseases. Powders with smaller particle sizes such as fluorescent powders, or the newer nanopowders are particularly concerning because they are small enough to reach and settle deep within the lungs. It is recommended that individuals frequently using these powders take the necessary precautions to mitigate the risk of respiratory illness, whether that be working within a fume hood or wearing a mask.

== See also ==
- Fingerprint
- Glove prints
