= Millwood (Richland County, South Carolina) =

Historic house in South Carolina, United States

- U.S. National Register of Historic Places
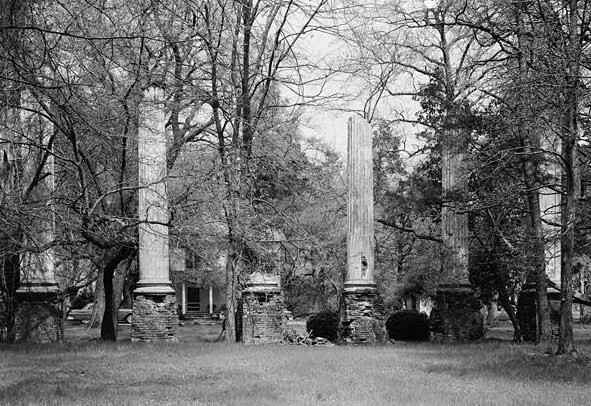
- Millwood Ruins in 1960.

- Location within South Carolina Location within the United States
- Location: 6100 Garner's Ferry Road
- Nearest city: Columbia, South Carolina
- Coordinates: 33°59′16″N 80°57′45″W
- Built: ca. 1830
- Architect: Nathaniel Potter (renovation)
- Architectural style: Greek Revival
- NRHP reference No.: 71000803
- Added to NRHP: March 18, 1971

Millwood is the site and ruins of an antebellum plantation house at 6100 Garner's Ferry Road (US 76), Columbia, South Carolina. Owned by Colonel Wade Hampton II and his wife Ann Fitzsimmons Hampton, it was the boyhood home of their first son Wade Hampton III and other children. He later became a Confederate general and later, South Carolina governor, and U.S. Senator.

After the death of Wade Hampton II in 1858, the house was inherited by his four unmarried daughters. On February 17, 1865, it was burned by General Sherman's troops at the same time the city of Columbia was burned. On March 18, 1971, the ruins were named to the National Register of Historic Places.

== Hampton family ==
Wade Hampton I (1752–1835) was a lieutenant colonel in the American Revolutionary War, a brigadier general in the War of 1812, a congressman, and a wealthy planter. When he died in 1835, he was considered one of the wealthiest men in America with plantations in Mississippi, Louisiana, and South Carolina; he was the wealthiest planter in the Southern United States.

Wade Hampton II (1791–1858) was called Colonel due to a commission in the South Carolina Militia. He served two terms in the South Carolina Senate. Although he never sought another political office, he played a major role in South Carolina politics. He was an avid sportsman, hunter, and horse breeder.

Wade Hampton III (1818–1902) was the first son of Wade Hampton II. He served in the Confederate Army by leading Hampton's Legion rising to the rank of lieutenant general. After the war, near the end of Reconstruction, he was elected as the first Democratic governor in the South since before the Civil War. He was later elected as a U.S. Senator from South Carolina.

== Architecture ==
Various sources indicate that Millwood was constructed in 1817, 1830, or after 1815 and probably in the 1830s, Since many early houses were expanded over the years, it is possible that there is truth in all the statements.

Wade Hampton II married his first wife, Ann Fitzsimons, in 1817. His father had given him his Mill Tract north of the present Garner's Ferry Road. His father's home was the original Woodlands south of the Garner's Ferry Road. Wade Hampton II built a raised, two-story cottage prior to the birth of Wade Hampton III in 1818. In 1837 or 1838, Millwood was remodeled in Greek Revival style by the architect Nathaniel Potter from Rhode Island. His plan had a wing on each side, six two-story columns at the center, and three smaller columns on each wing. The renovations took about two years. During this time, the family lived away in a resort near White Sulphur Springs.

An artistic rendition of the house has been published. It shows the central, two-story section with the prostyle, hexastyle portico. There were matching one-story wings fronted by three columns on either side. The central section of the sketch resembled the extant Millford Plantation house, which was built by Hampton's youngest sister and brother-in-law in Sumter County, South Carolina. Millford and the renovations of Millwood had the same architect, Nathaniel Porter.

A conjectural floor plan of Millwood's first floor was published based on Hampton family accounts. This shows a central hall with two rooms on each side of the front of the house. With wide folding doors between these rooms, the entire width of the house could be open for entertaining and dancing. A cross hall behind these rooms connected to the wings. There was a curving staircase to the second floor at the end of the main hall. The wings extended beyond the back of the central section.

== Millwood's role in South Carolina ==
Because of the entertaining and powerful guests, Millwood has been called the "social center of South Carolina" in the antebellum period. In addition to major South Carolina politicians, planters, and the "aristocracy," national guests included Henry Clay and Daniel Webster.

The inaugural party for Governor William Aiken, Jr. in 1844 was held at Millwood.

== Destruction in 1865 ==
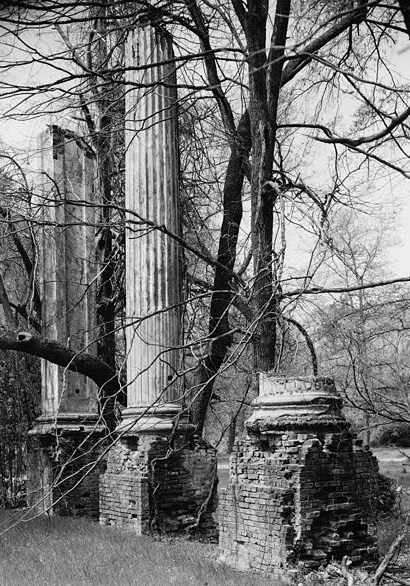

Before Sherman's troops arrived in the area, the family silver, china, crystal, and family portraits including their Troye horse paintings were taken to York, South Carolina for safety. The Hampton family plantations in the area including Millwood, the old Woodlands, and Diamond Hill were set ablaze. There is no proof that this was done under Sherman's orders, but the houses were probably too far from downtown Columbia to have been accidentally burned. The Hampton-Preston House in Columbia was spared.

All that remained of the original Millwood were the twelve columns, the smoke house, the wing house, and a portion of the stable. Sometime later, the six shorter columns that were in front of the wings were torn down. Around 1930, one of the round columns toppled. Its base remains along with the three other round columns and two square columns.

Miss Hamptons built a nearby cottage after the war. This was burned by arsonists after the bitterly contested gubernatorial election that Wade Hampton III won in 1876. They rebuilt a new two-story house around the old kitchen and laundry near the ruins of the original Millwood.
