= High Hampton Inn Historic District =

Historic district in North Carolina, United States

- U.S. National Register of Historic Places
- U.S. Historic district
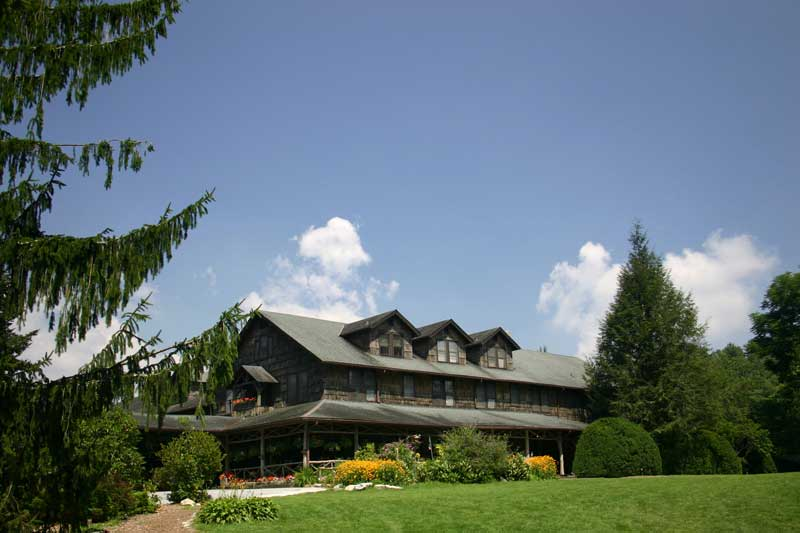
- High Hampton Inn

- Location within North Carolina Location within the United States
- Location: Cashiers Township, Jackson County, North Carolina
- Nearest city: Cashiers, North Carolina
- Coordinates: 35°5′56″N 83°4′57″W
- Area: 30 acres (12 ha)
- Built: 1933
- Built by: Builders Supply & Lumber Co.
- Architect: Stillwell, Erle Gulick
- Architectural style: Vernacular Rustic
- NRHP reference No.: 91001468
- Added to NRHP: September 26, 1991

The High Hampton Inn Historic District is a historic estate, resort, and national historic district nestled in the mountains of western North Carolina, in the Cashiers Valley in Jackson County, North Carolina. Originally the summer home of the prosperous Hampton family of South Carolina, the property was listed on the National Register of Historic Places in 1991.

Wealthy planter Wade Hampton II purchased 450 acres (180 ha) in Cashiers Valley as an escape from the summer heat, humidity, and malaria of the Charleston and Columbia, South Carolina region. The property became a favorite hunting preserve for the Hampton family and their friends. Young Wade Hampton III learned to ride horses at High Hampton, a skill that served him well as a leading Confederate cavalry commander during the American Civil War.

In the 1880s, the property passed into the hands of Hampton II's three daughters. They sold it in 1890 to their niece Caroline Hampton and her new husband, Dr. William Halsted, a prominent surgeon. Halsted purchased several adjoining farms and pieces of property, eventually expanding his holdings to more than 2,200 acres (890 ha). The Halsteds both died in 1922.

A North Carolina businessman, E. Lyndon McKee, and his wife, Gertrude, purchased the estate in 1922. After purchasing the property, the McKee's built a rustic two story Inn and added the famous 11 hole golf course designed by J. Victor East in 1924. Disaster struck High Hampton in 1932 when a fire broke out in the detached kitchen, burning the Inn, Hampton Hunting Lodge, and the Halsted Cottage to the ground. In 1933, the property was renovated and adapted as the present High Hampton Inn, which opened for business. Descendants of Lyndon and Gertrude McKee owned and operated the resort for 95 years ending with the sale of the property in 2017.

After 95 years, the Inn and Club is under the ownership of the Birmingham-based Arlington Family Offices, working with seasoned management group Daniel Communities to operate High Hampton’s club amenities, including the newly-redesigned Thomas Fazio golf course. The Beall family, along with the Blackberry Farm, have joined the High Hampton team in the revitalization of the historic inn and cottages into a year-round operation. Today, families continue the storied traditions of High Hampton into the next 100 years. To continue representing these traditions, The High Hampton History Center was founded in 2019. The History Centers main focus is to provide tours, programs, and archive the vast collection of historic photos and artifacts from the property. The History Center is located in the Historic Caddie House (1924).

The High Hampton Inn Historic District encompasses 12 contributing buildings and 1 contributing site. They include the High Hampton Inn (1932-1933), a 2 1/2-story, L-shaped, gable-roofed Rustic style structure sheathed in chestnut bark siding. It was designed by locally prominent architect Erle Stillwell and features a one-story, hip roofed wraparound porch with an extended Porte-cochère. Other contributing resources include the Lake Cottage (1932), Hampton Cottage (1932), Halsted Cottage (1932), Chimney Top Cottage (c. 1932), Rock Mountain Cottage (1941), Mayapple Cottage (1932), Lodge Cottage (c. 1900 and 1925), Thorpe Cottage (1936), Wade Hampton Smokehouse (c. 1890), Supply Building (c. 1890 and 1927), and the Recreational Landscape (1922-1941).

Buildings that are no longer on the property include: Appletree Cottage (c. 1900 and 1937), Caroline Cottage (1941), Lewis Cottage (c. 1932), Stable (1933), Housekeeping/Garage (1933) .

The current High Hampton Inn and Country Club consists of 1,400 acres (570 ha).

== See also ==
- National Register of Historic Places listings in Jackson County, North Carolina
