= Glove prints =

Mark left on a surface by a worn glove

Glove prints, also sometimes described as gloveprints or glove marks, are latent, fingerprint-like impressions that are transferred to a surface or object by an individual who is wearing gloves.

Criminals often wear gloves to avoid leaving fingerprints, which makes the investigation of crimes more difficult. Although the gloves act as a protective covering for the wearer's prints, the gloves themselves can leave prints that are sometimes unique like human fingerprints, thus betraying the wearer. After collecting glove prints, law enforcement can then match them to gloves that they have collected as evidence as well as glove prints retrieved from other crime scenes.

== History ==
Since the advent of fingerprint detection, many criminals have resorted to the wearing of gloves during the commission of their crimes in order to avoid leaving their fingerprints as evidence. In the era prior to contemporary advances in forensic science, the simple act of covering the hands often assured criminal assailants their anonymity if no witnesses were present during their offenses; thus a pair of gloves became the most essential and crucial tool for any successful perpetrator.

In earlier decades, investigators would dust for fingerprints only to find smears and smudges caused by gloves. Often in earlier decades these smudges were ignored because very little of their detail was retrievable. With the advent of latent fingerprint detection in the late 20th century, investigators started to collect, analyze, and record prints left at crime scenes that were created by the wearing of gloves. Glove prints can be as simple as marks caused by seams or folds in fabric of a glove, or they can be as complex as marks left behind by the grain or texture of the fabric of a glove. When gloves are collected as evidence their prints can be taken and compared to glove prints that were taken at crime scenes or from evidence.

Offenders who wear gloves tend to use their hands and fingers very freely, and thus, because their gloves give them a false sense of protection, leave easily distinguishable glove prints on the surfaces they handle. If when either a fingerprint is able to pass through a glove, or when, because of holes in a glove, finger and glove prints appear together, investigators are now able to better distinguish between prints made by friction ridges and prints made by gloves. Many times this also happens because criminals also opt to wear gloves that are both tight-fitting and relatively short, which makes the occurrence of prints being made by the butt of the palm and the wrist (palm prints) more common as the gloves may slip, thus exposing areas of the skin that may leave prints. Also, many times criminals would discard their gloves at crime scenes or hide them nearby. Today, latent fingerprints (first discovered on the surfaces of fabrics by investigators in the 1930s), as well as DNA and incriminating bacteria can also be recovered from the inside of these discarded gloves.

In many jurisdictions the act of wearing gloves itself while committing a crime can be prosecuted as an inchoate offense.

By the 1950s, after over a half century of frustration due to the wearing of gloves by assailants, fingerprint experts began studies to determine how it may be feasible to detect and compare glove prints found at crime scenes.

In 1971, the Metropolitan Police Service of London, England claims the first (or one of the first) convictions based on glove print-evidence. Glove-prints were found on a broken window and were later matched to the gloves of a suspect.

In 2005, a German forensic scientist and engineer carried out various empirical studies on glove prints. The manufacturing engineer carried out basic research into the manufacturing techniques of gloves to determine individual and functional characteristics of the glove surfaces. This included purely textile gloves, coated textile gloves (also dotted gloves), as well as gloves made of dipping forms and leather or artificial leather gloves, together with combinations of the aforementioned surfaces. He also developed the anatomical effects of the hand when creating glove prints. At the same time, many Landeskriminalamt began to transfer glove prints into their databases of traces. Since 2012, glove prints are an inherent part of the education of forensic experts at the Bundeskriminalamt (Germany) (Division KT – Forensic Science Institute).

Starting in early 2009, law enforcement in Derbyshire, East Midlands, England began uploading hundreds of files of collected glove prints into their criminal database. Glove Print Database to help Police in their fight against crime The Glove Mark Working Group in Derbyshire includes the Derbyshire Police Department, the Home Office Scientific Development Branch, and Nottingham Trent University.

With the belief that individual offenders possess preferences for specific types of gloves (style and fabric/material), forensic scientists have also used glove print databases to create complex computations and charts that isolate, geographically, "hot spots" where prints taken from specific types of gloves are matched against similar types of crimes. Forensic scientists have even had success matching partial glove prints by using these databases and related software. Offenders may prefer a specific type of glove depending on its perceived inherent benefits. Latex, nitrile, plastic, rubber, or vinyl gloves are worn because they are thin and cling to the wearer's skin which in turn provides a level of dexterity to the wearer. Leather gloves possess pores that provides the wearer with an enhanced gripping ability. Leather gloves that are thin and tight-fitting provide both enhanced gripping and dexterity to the wearer.

== Prints from different glove types ==
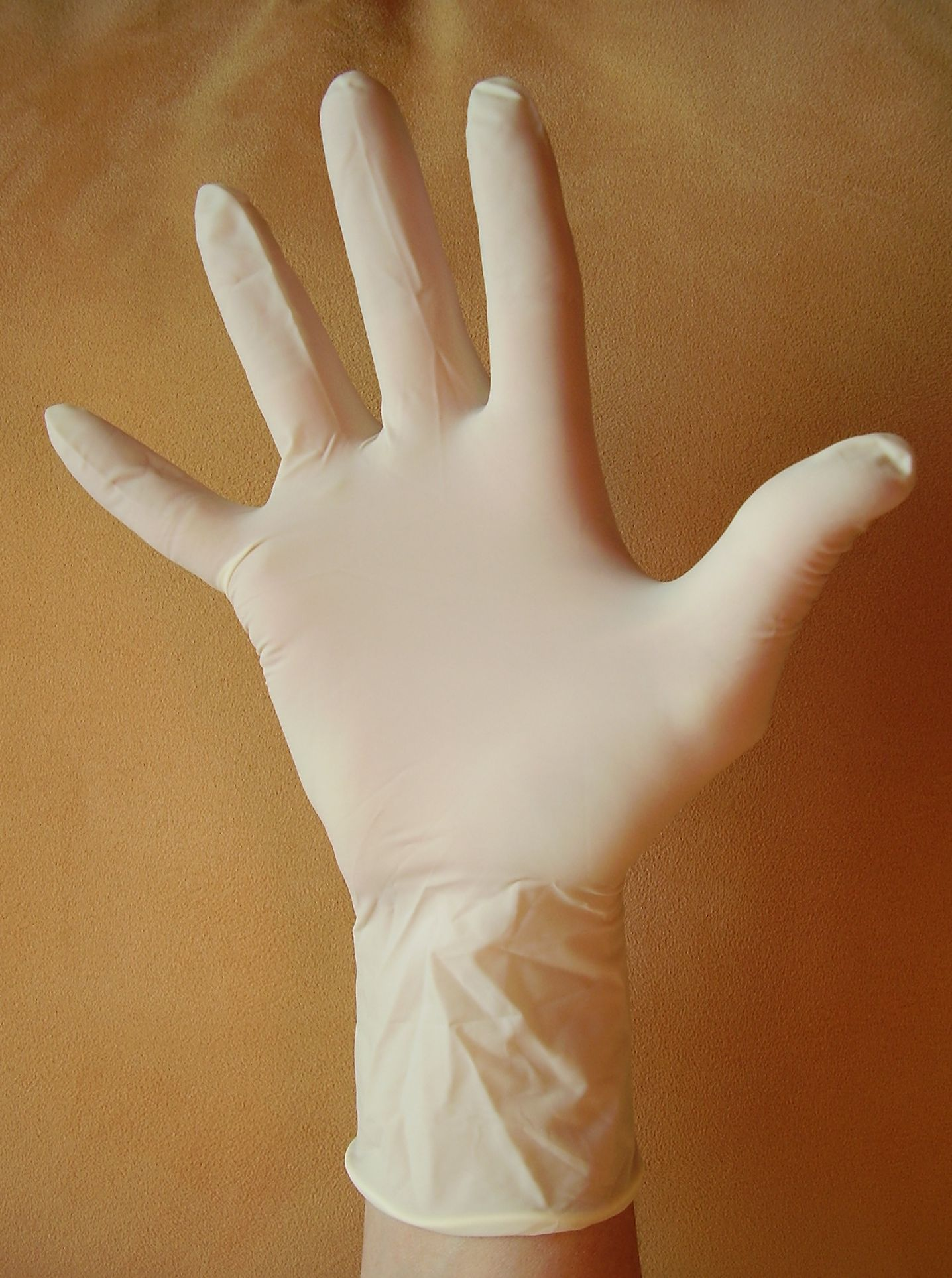
Assailants may prefer thin latex gloves because their snug fit helps to maintain dexterity. This same thin and snugness may allow the wearer's fingerprints to pass through the material. When discovered by authorities, latent fingerprints may also be recovered from the inside of these gloves.

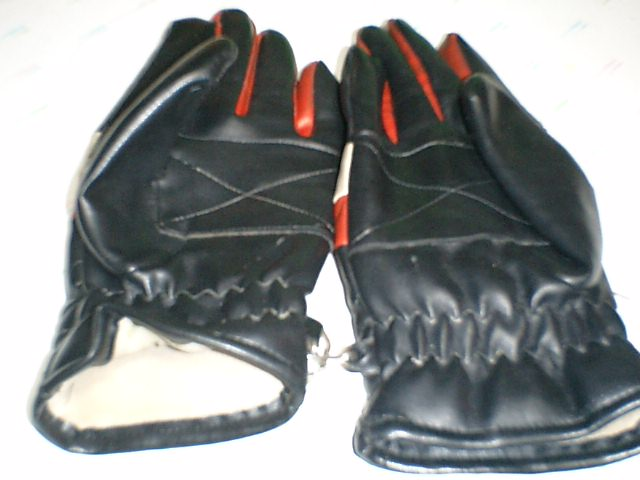
Lined leather gloves may leave a print that is as unique as a human fingerprint. When discovered by authorities, latent fingerprints may also be recovered from the inside of these gloves.

- Thin, latex, rubber, plastic, vinyl or nitrile gloves: These gloves are worn by criminals because of their tight, thin fit that allows the hands to remain dexterous. Because of the thinness of these gloves, fingerprints may pass through the material, thus transferring the wearer's prints onto whatever surface is touched or handled. Latent prints can also be recovered from Latex, Vinyl, and Nitrile gloves, via several methods, such as cyanoacrylate, Ninhydrin, Gentian Violet, and Magnetic Powder processing.
- Leather gloves: These gloves are worn by criminals because the tactile properties of the leather allow for good grip and dexterity. These properties are the result of the grain present on the surface of the glove. The grain makes the surface of the leather unique to each glove. Over time, the pores and grain of leather gloves will pick up dirt and grease from surfaces that they have touched or handled. The dirt and grease can in return help to create prints on surfaces. Also, unlined gloves provide the most dexterity but can over time become saturated with the oils and sweat of the wearer's hands. This helps to increase the gripping properties of the gloves but causes the gloves to leave prints. A print that contains the glove wearer's sweat and oils will contain their DNA, which can incriminate them. Investigators are able to dust for the marks left behind from leather the same way they dust for fingerprints.
- Woolen, cotton, or other fabric gloves: These gloves are worn by criminals because they are typically inexpensive and readily available as well. Weave patterns of fabric gloves may also be unique to that glove and when collected at a crime scene, can be compared to gloves that are taken in as evidence. Like leather gloves, these gloves will over time pick up dirt and grease as well.

== Notable instances ==
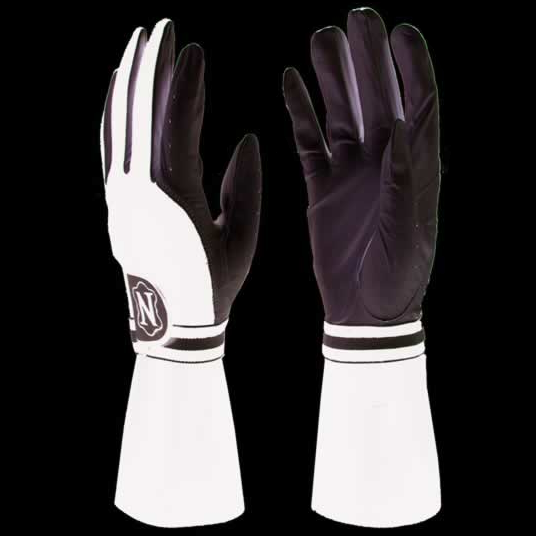
Batting gloves usually include an unlined leather palm and a nylon or cotton back. For the same reason baseball players wear these gloves, to improve their grip while maintaining dexterity while batting, assailants wear these gloves as to maintain dexterity and be able to grip easily during their offenses.

- In 1993, Rochester, New York law enforcement was responding to a reported burglary when they arrested a suspect who was fleeing the burglarized home. On his person, investigators found a yellow rubber glove that was later found to match glove prints that were found on property that was known to have been stolen from the home.
- In 2001, Cobb County, Georgia, US, law enforcement responded to a break-in and burglary of an under-construction condominium development and found glove marks on a window that had been pushed open by the perpetrator. Law enforcement later found the perpetrator hiding in the complex and collected items that the perpetrator was hiding with him. Investigators were able to match the texture and weave pattern of the palms of the pair of construction/work-type gloves that the perpetrator had to the glove prints found on the window.
- In 2002, Grand Rapids, Michigan law enforcement was investigating a string of burglaries in the area. No fingerprints were found but latent glove prints were found with the use of fingerprint powder. A particularly detailed hand print of a leather glove became visible at the break-in point of one burglary. After a group of suspected burglars were brought in, the investigators received a warrant to search a vehicle that was linked the suspects. A brown leather batting glove was recovered that seemed to match the stitch detail on the glove prints taken from the break-in point. After scanning both the palm of the leather glove and the recovered glove print into a computer, the investigators used Adobe Photoshop software to compare the grain detail of the glove with the grain detail of the glove print. The investigators were thus able to match the stitching and grain detail of both, thus incriminating the suspects.
- In 2009, a teenager was arrested in Royal Oak, Michigan for obstructing police near the location of a recently reported burglary. While in custody investigators compared the gloves that the suspect had in his possession to glove prints that were found at several break-in locations. Investigators were able to link marks left on a window to his gloves.
- In 2011, the Maricopa County, Arizona Sheriff's Office began investigating a string of robberies, dating to at least 1993, of high-end homes in the vicinity of Paradise Valley, Arizona. Investigators noted that the assailant (or assailants) wore fabric/cloth gardening gloves with rubber grips that had left unique prints on many surfaces in the burglarized locations. Upon arresting a 58-year-old suspect near a home, that was under surveillance by the sheriff's office, authorities found amongst burglary tools in his possession, gardening gloves that matched the unique prints found at the burglarized locations.
- In 2012, law enforcement in Newton County, Indiana found unique glove prints at a home that was recently burglarized. The impressions left by the gloves seemed to possess indentations made by letters "M", "e", and "c" which would have been present on the surface of the gloves. Authorities were later able to match these unique impressions to Mechanix-brand gloves that were found at the residence of a suspect.
- On December 7, 2013 the Toronto Sun reported that the Royal Canadian Mounted Police seized hundreds of firearms that they found while searching homes in High River, Alberta that were temporarily deserted due to the 2013 Alberta floods. Residents who had their firearms seized also found glove marks on conspicuous places such as bedroom furniture, where guns were thought to be stored.
