= Columbia Historic District II =

Historic district in South Carolina, United States

- U.S. National Register of Historic Places
- U.S. Historic district
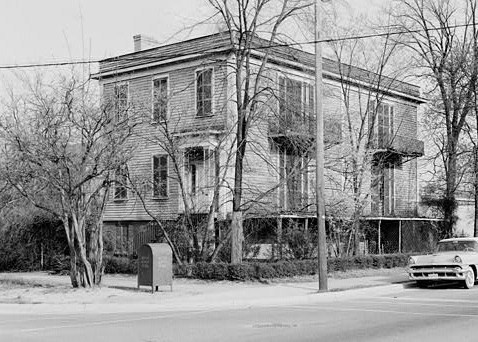
- Crawford-Clarkson House, HABS Photo, April 1960

- Location within South Carolina Location within the United States
- Location: Roughly bounded by Taylor, Richland, Pickens, and Barnwell Sts.; Blanding, Laurel, Richland, Calhoun, Marion, Bull, Pickens, Henderson, and Barnwell Sts.; 1328 Blanding Street, Columbia, South Carolina
- Coordinates: 34°00′39″N 81°02′01″W
- Area: 41 acres (17 ha)
- Built: 1820
- Architect: Mills, Robert, et al.
- Architectural style: Early Republic, Greek Revival, Columbia Cottage
- NRHP reference No.: 71000799 (original); 82003901 (increase 1); 100003002 (increase 2)

Significant dates
- Added to NRHP: May 6, 1971
- Boundary increases: June 28, 1982; October 2, 2018

Columbia Historic District II is a national historic district located at Columbia, South Carolina. The district encompasses 113 contributing buildings and 1 contributing site in a former residential section of Columbia. They were built between the early-19th century and the 1930s (majority between 1900 and 1918) and are now mostly used for commercial purposes. The buildings are in the Greek Revival, Gothic Revival, Classical Revival, and the “Columbia Cottage” styles. Notable buildings include the Robert Mills House, Debruhl-Marshall House, Hampton-Preston House, Episcopal Church of the Good Shepherd, Crawford-Clarkson House, Maxcy Gregg House, Hale-Elmore-Seibels House, St. Paul's Lutheran Church, and Ebenezer Lutheran Church.

It was added to the National Register of Historic Places in 1971. It was enlarged in 1982, and underwent a boundary adjustment in 2018.
