= Robert Mills House =

Historic house in South Carolina, United States

- U.S. National Register of Historic Places
- U.S. National Historic Landmark
- U.S. Historic district – Contributing property
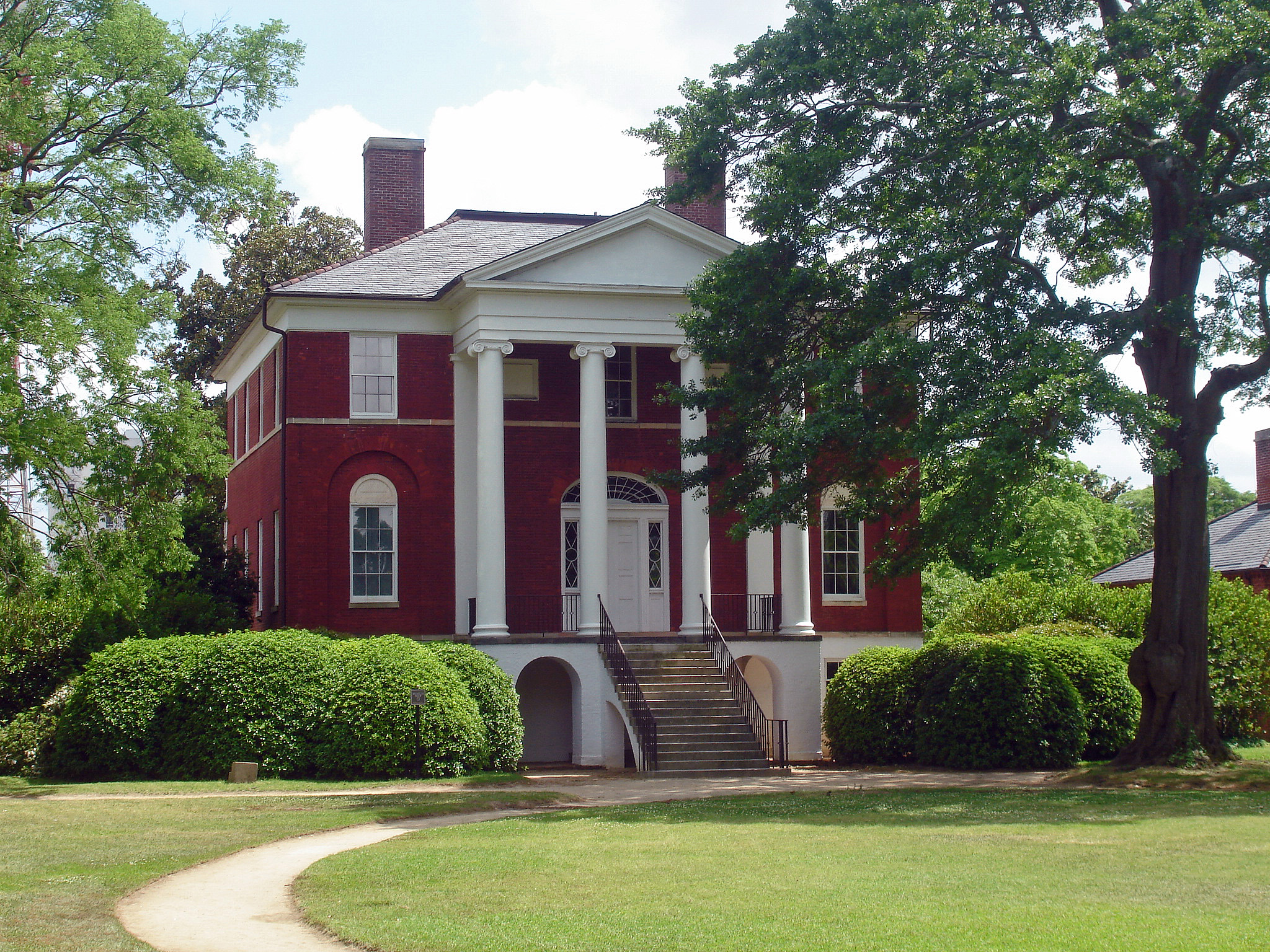
- Robert Mills House - Ainsley Hall House

- Location within South Carolina Location within the United States
- Location: 1616 Blanding St., Columbia, South Carolina
- Coordinates: 34°0′34″N 81°1′45″W
- Area: 4 acres (1.6 ha)
- Built: 1823
- Architect: Robert Mills
- Architectural style: Early Republic, Federal
- Part of: Columbia Historic District II (ID71000799)
- NRHP reference No.: 70000595

Significant dates
- Added to NRHP: July 16, 1970
- Designated NHL: November 7, 1973
- Designated CP: May 6, 1971

The Robert Mills House, also known as Robert Mills Historic House and Park or the Ainsley Hall House, is a historic house museum at 1616 Blanding Street in Columbia, South Carolina. Built in 1823 to a design by Robert Mills, it was designated a National Historic Landmark in 1973 for its architectural significance. The Historic Columbia Foundation owns and operates the home, which has been furnished with decorative arts of the early 19th century, including American Federal, English Regency, and French Empire pieces.

== Description and history ==
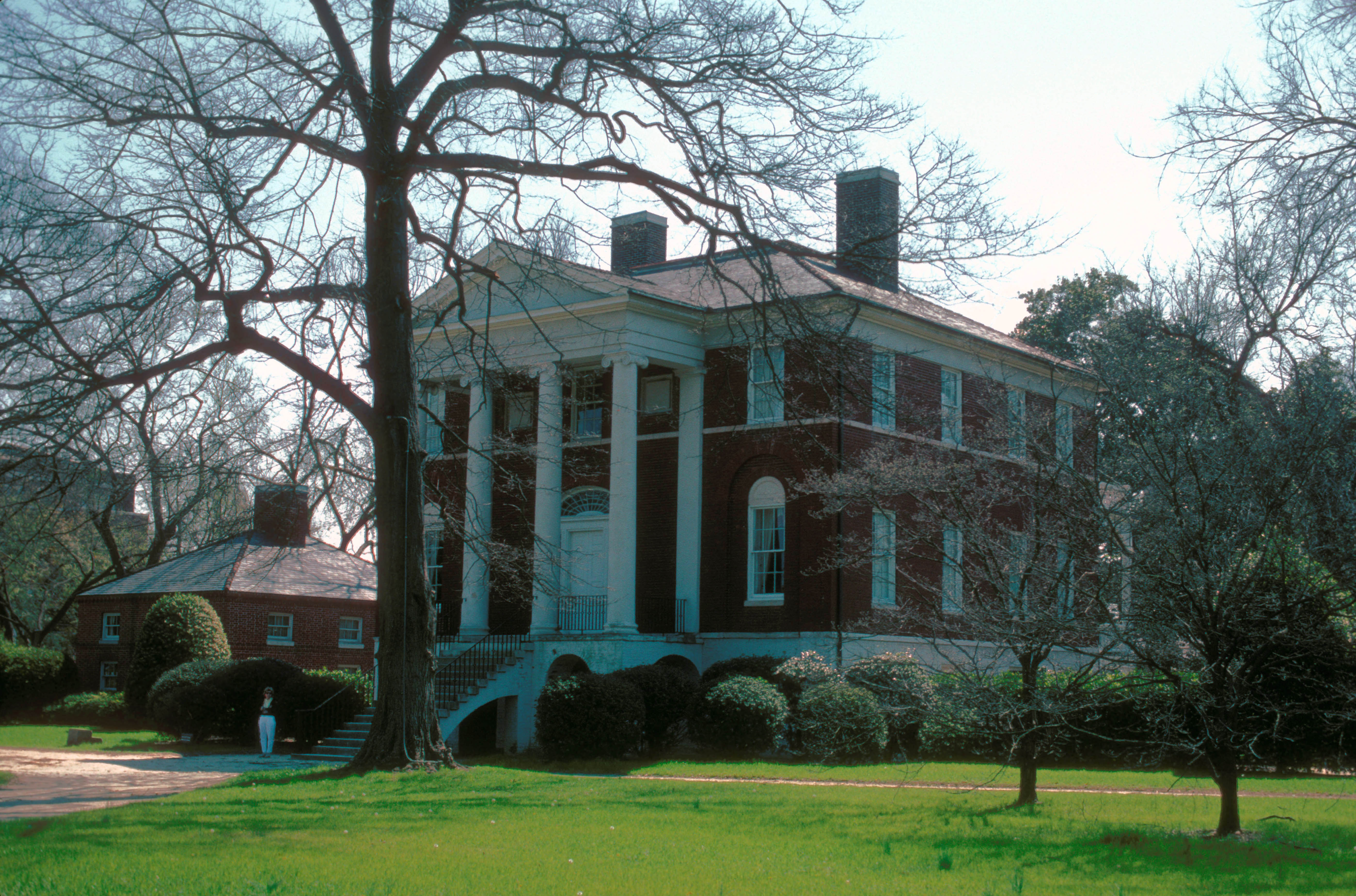
Robert Mills House

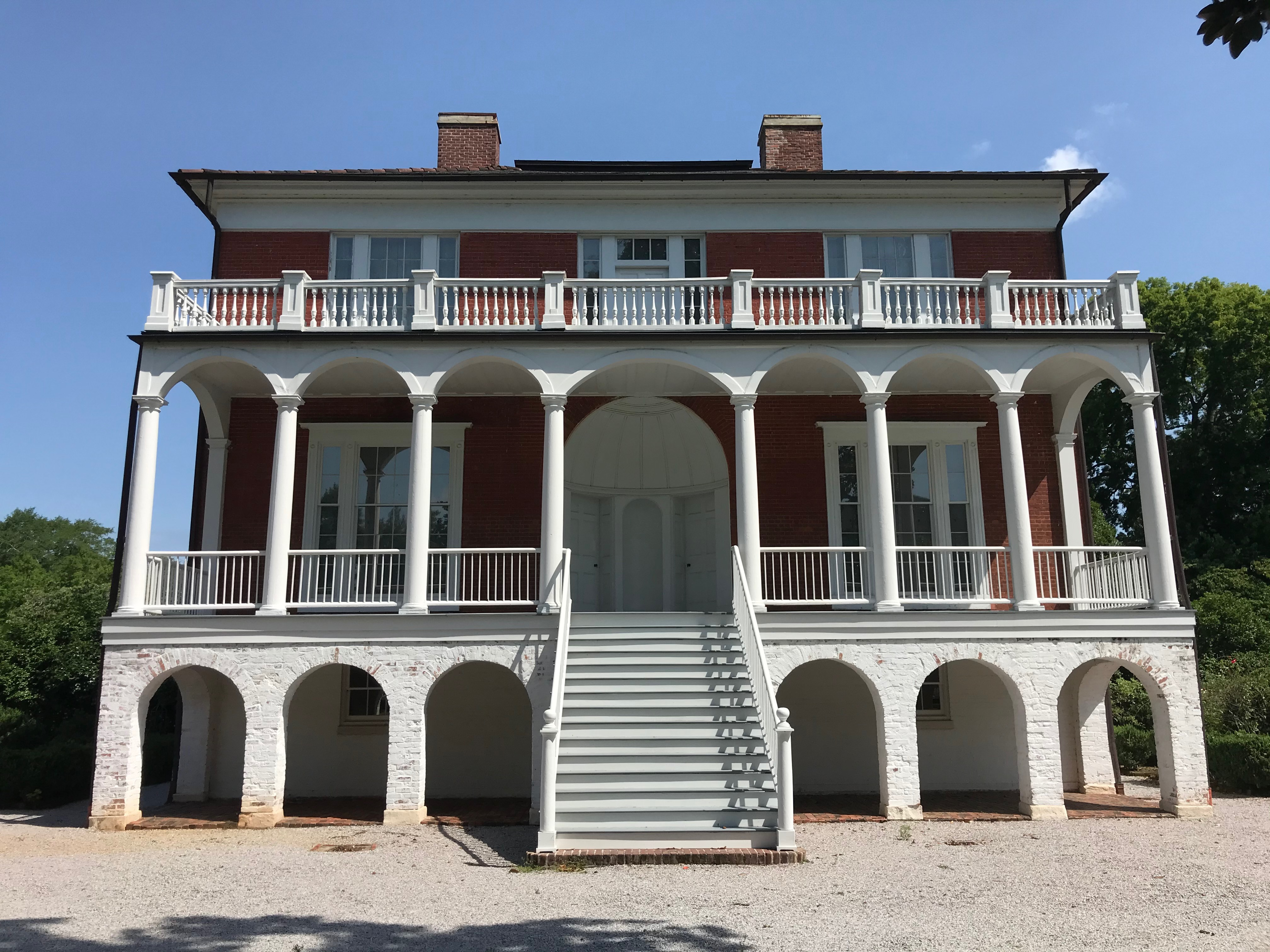
Robert Mills House (Rear)

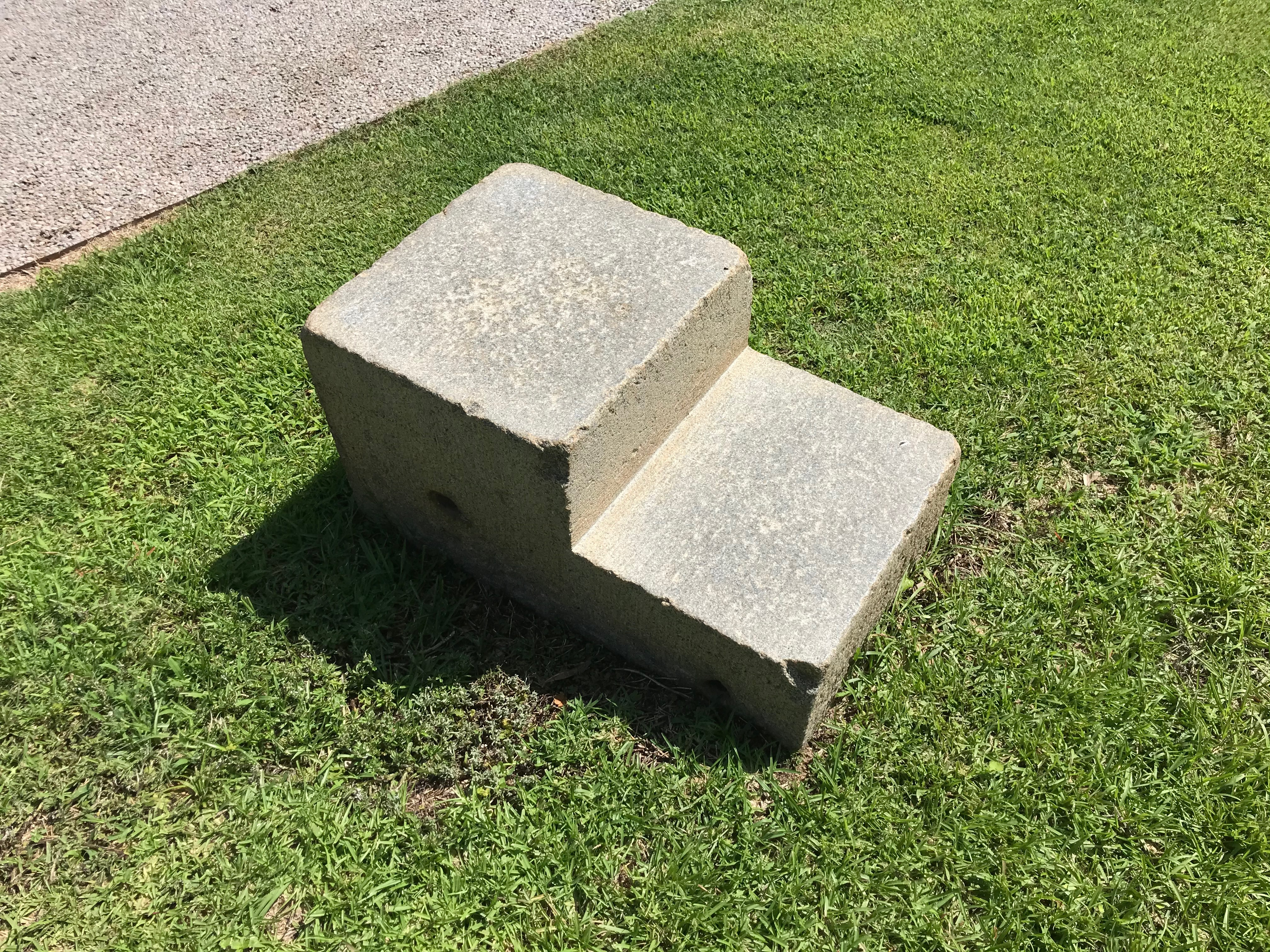
A stone step used to climb onto horse carriages.

The Robert Mills House is located in a parklike 4-acre (1.6 ha) parcel that occupies an entire city block in central Columbia. It is a two-story masonry structure, built out of brick set on a high basement with arcaded walls. Its main facade faces north, with a Classical projecting portico that has four Ionic columns supporting a gabled pediment. The main entrance is topped by a fanlight window, and the windows in the flanking bays are set in round-arch openings, a Mills design hallmark. The building's entrance hall is symmetrical, with the stairwell concealed behind a doorway that is matched by a false doorway on the opposite wall. The hall has curved ends, as do the matching parlors, providing an illusion of increased space.

The house was designed by Mills and built in 1823 for Ainsley Hall, who died before it was finished. It was for many years part of the campus of the Columbia Theological Seminary, which moved out of Columbia in 1960. With the property threatened with development, it was acquired by Historic Columbia and restored, opening as a museum in 1967.

== See also ==
- List of National Historic Landmarks in South Carolina
- National Register of Historic Places listings in Columbia, South Carolina
