= Debruhl-Marshall House =

Historic house in South Carolina, United States

- U.S. National Register of Historic Places
- U.S. Historic district – Contributing property
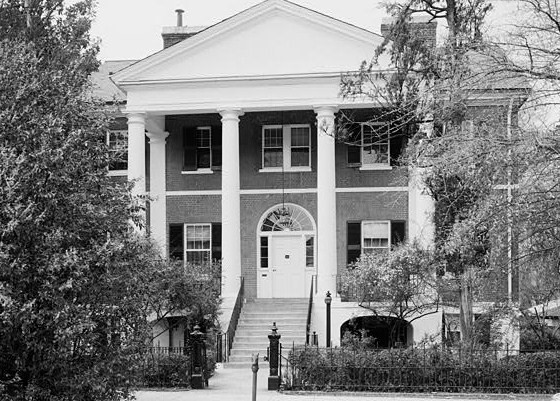
- DeBruhl-Marshall House, HABS Photo, April 1960

- Location within South Carolina Location within the United States
- Location: 1401 Laurel St., Columbia, South Carolina
- Coordinates: 34°0′38″N 81°2′2″W
- Area: 0 acres (0 ha)
- Built: 1820
- Architectural style: Greek Revival
- NRHP reference No.: 72001218
- Added to NRHP: March 23, 1972

Debruhl-Marshall House is a historic home located in Columbia, South Carolina. It was built in 1820, and is a two-story, five-bay, brick Greek Revival style dwelling. It has a gabled slate roof and full basement. The front facade features a three-bay portico supported by four massive Doric order columns.

It was added to the National Register of Historic Places in 1972. It is located in the Columbia Historic District II.
