= Halsted's principles =

Principles of surgical technique

Halsted's principles, also known as Tenets of Halsted, are the basic principles of surgical technique regarding tissue handling.

These key points were introduced in the late 19th century by William Stewart Halsted, co-founder of Johns Hopkins Hospital.

- Gentle handling of tissue
- Meticulous haemostasis
- Preservation of blood supply
- Strict aseptic technique
- Minimum tension on tissues
- Accurate tissue apposition
- Obliteration of deadspace
