= Wade Hampton II =

United States Army officer, planter and politician (1791–1858)

- Born: Wade Hampton II; 21 April 1791; Columbia, South Carolina, U.S.
- Died: 10 February 1858 (aged 66)
- Occupations: Politician, agrarian, and serviceman
- Spouse: Ann Fitzsimmons
- Children: 8, including Wade III
- Parent(s): Wade Hampton I and Harriet Flud

Wade Hampton II (April 21, 1791 – February 10, 1858) was a United States Army officer, planter and politician who served in the War of 1812. He was a member of the Hampton family, whose influence was strong in South Carolina politics and social circles for nearly 100 years.

== Early life and education ==
Hampton was born in Columbia, South Carolina, the son of General Wade Hampton I (1752–1835) and Harriet Flud. He was educated privately in his early years.

== Life ==
He served in the military during the War of 1812, becoming a lieutenant of dragoons in 1813. He served as acting inspector general and aide to General Andrew Jackson at New Orleans in 1815.

As an adult, Hampton attended mostly to his extensive holdings, as his numerous plantations and houses in two states, overseers and managers, and thousands of slaves, all required extended management. He had several plantations in Issaquena County, Mississippi, where he held a total of 335 slaves by 1860, as well as properties in South Carolina and his summer home in the western mountains of North Carolina.

== Marriage and family ==
Hampton married Ann Fitzsimmons on March 6, 1817, from a wealthy family in Charleston, South Carolina. They had several children, as listed:

- Wade Hampton III (born March 28, 1818, in Charleston, South Carolina, died April 11, 1902, in Columbia, South Carolina);
- Christopher Fitzsimmons Hampton (born August 11, 1821, on Millwood Plantation, Richland County, South Carolina, died June 8, 1886, on Linden Plantation, Washington County, Mississippi);
- Harriet Flud Hampton (born April 16, 1823, on Millwood Plantation, Richland County, South Carolina, died June 2, 1848, on Millwood Plantation);
- Catharine P. Hampton (born November 24, 1824, on Millwood Plantation, died August 10, 1916, in Columbia, South Carolina);
- Ann M. Hampton (born September 7, 1826, on Millwood Plantation, died May 5, 1914, in Columbia, South Carolina);
- Caroline Louisa Hampton (born January 25, 1828, on Millwood Plantation, died 1902 in Richland County, South Carolina);
- Frank Hampton (born June 19, 1829, on Millwood Plantation, died June 9, 1863, at Brandy Station, Culpeper County, Virginia);
- Mary Fisher Hampton (born January 13, 1833, on Millwood Plantation, died December 12, 1866, Richland County, South Carolina).

Hampton's sister-in-law Catherine Fitzsimmons, a shy girl, at age 17 married James Henry Hammond, making him a wealthy man with her large dowry. He eventually owned more than 20 square miles of property and hundreds of slaves through wealth gained by this marriage. The families saw each other socially because of this relationship.

In 1843 Hampton learned that Hammond had sexually abused his daughters (Hammond's nieces) as teenagers and accused him when he was still governor, although nothing was written publicly. As rumors of Hammond's behavior spread, he was socially ostracized and his political career was derailed for a decade. But, he recovered sufficient political standing to be elected in 1856 by the South Carolina legislature as US senator from the state. The Hampton daughters' reputations were irrevocably tarnished. None of the daughters ever married.

Anne and Wade's son Wade Hampton III entered the Confederate Army, becoming a prominent Confederate cavalry general in the American Civil War. After restrictions against former Confederates were lifted, he entered politics. During the end of Reconstruction, he was elected as Governor of South Carolina in 1876 as white Democrats took back political control of the state through use of paramilitary groups, such as the Red Shirts. They publicly disrupted Republican meetings, intimidated and attacked black voters and suppressed their voting during this campaign, and again in the gubernatorial campaign of 1878. Historian George C. Rable said these groups acted as "the military arm of the Democratic Party."

== Legacy and honors ==
The Hampton family summer retreat, High Hampton, which they had built in the western mountains of North Carolina, is listed on the National Register of Historic Places, as are their mansion in Columbia, South Carolina, the Hampton-Preston House; and the ruins of their plantation house Millwoods in Richland County, South Carolina. (The latter was burned during the Civil War.)

Hampton was interred in the churchyard at Trinity Episcopal Church in Columbia.
