= Anton Wölfler =

Austrian surgeon (1850–1917)

Anton Wölfler (12 January 1850 – 31 January 1917) was an Austrian surgeon born in Kopezten, a village near Kladrau, Bohemia.

In 1874 he earned his medical doctorate from the University of Vienna, where he was a student of Theodor Billroth (1829–1894). Afterwards, he remained in Vienna for several years as Billroth's assistant. In 1886, he became a professor of surgery at the University of Graz, and from 1895 was a professor at Charles University in Prague.

Wölfler is remembered for his work in gastrointestinal surgery, and for his investigations involving the thyroid gland. On 28 September 1881 he performed the first gastroenterostomy, which occurred on a patient suffering from an inoperable carcinoma of the pylorus. He is also credited with providing the first detailed description of postoperative tetany.

== Associated eponyms ==
- "Wölfler's gland": An accessory thyroid gland.
- "Wölfler's operation": Operation of gastroenterostomy. described in a paper titled Gastro-Enterostomie in: Centralblatt für Chirurgie, Leipzig, 1881, 8: 705–708.
