= Hampton–Preston House =

Historic house in South Carolina, United States

- Hampton–Preston Mansion & Gardens
- U.S. National Register of Historic Places
- U.S. Historic district – Contributing property
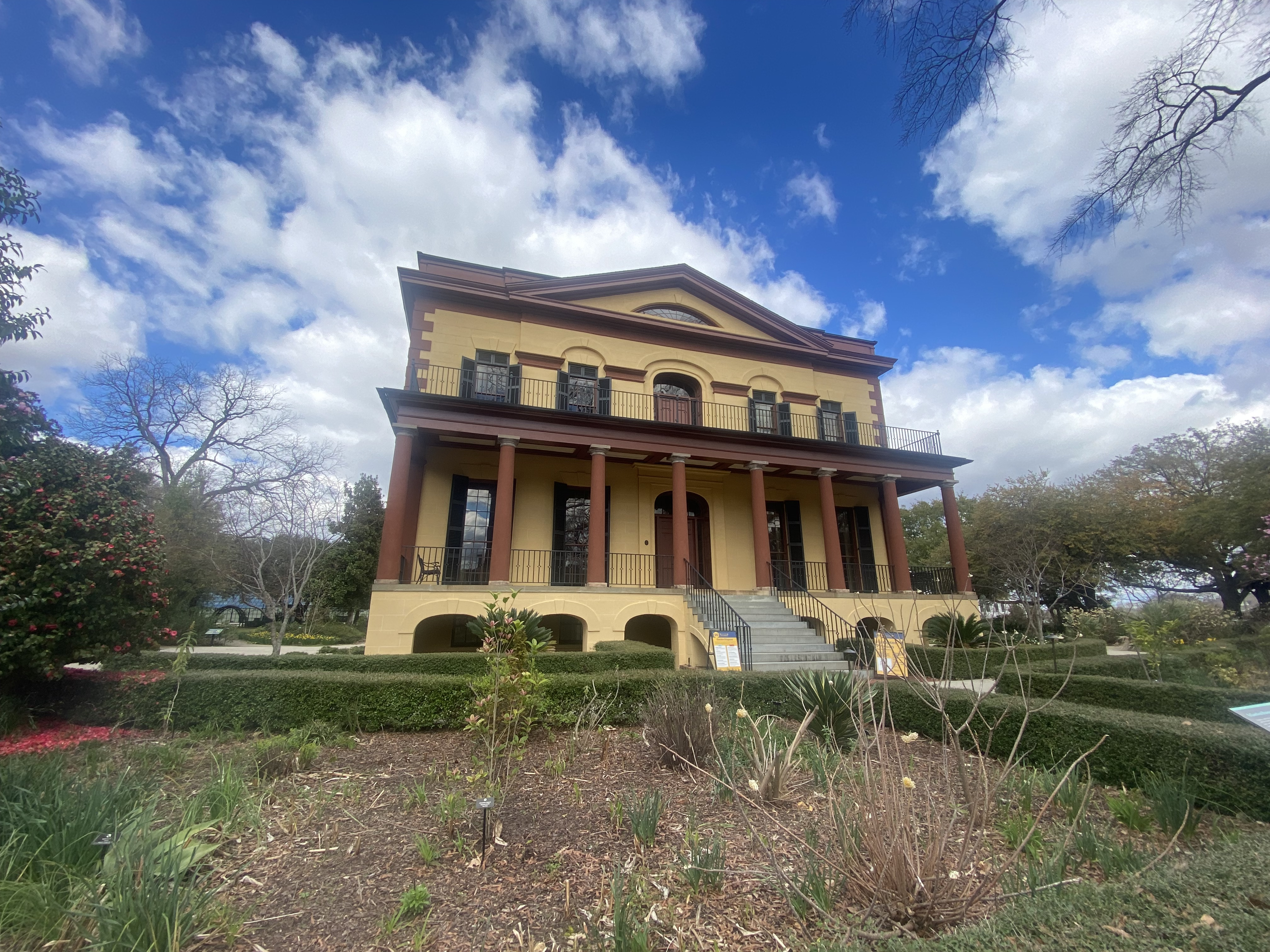
- Hampton–Preston House

- Location within South Carolina Location within the United States
- Location: 1615 Blanding Street, Columbia, South Carolina
- Coordinates: 34°0′37″N 81°1′46″W
- Area: 0.5 acres (0.20 ha)
- Built: 1818
- Architect: Zachariah Philips, Robert Yates
- NRHP reference No.: 69000172
- Added to NRHP: July 29, 1969

The Hampton–Preston House located at 1615 Blanding Street in Columbia, South Carolina, is a historic mansion that was the home of members of the prominent Hampton family. It was listed in the National Register of Historic Places on July 29, 1969.

Ainsley Hall, a wealthy Columbia merchant, had the house constructed in 1818. It was purchased a few years later by former War of 1812 general Wade Hampton I, a wealthy cotton planter. In turn, his son Wade Hampton II and grandson Wade Hampton III also resided in the home at various times, although ownership passed after Hampton I's death to his daughter Caroline and her husband, State Senator John S. Preston.

During the latter part of the American Civil War, the house was used as the headquarters of Union Maj. Gen. John A. Logan during the occupation of Columbia. The South Carolina Presbyterian Institute for Young Ladies acquired the mansion in 1890.

The house is of a post-Colonial, Classical Revival style, having a broad veranda across the front with Doric columns and a fanlight above. Inside is a sweeping circular stairway with mahogany rails. A crystal chandelier hangs in the middle of the hall. The rooms are spacious, and one is adorned with a white marble mantel by the sculptor Hiram Powers. The gardens covered a city block and were known throughout the state, but they have been plowed under and felled, eventually becoming a parking lot.

The Hampton–Preston House was restored and reopened to the public in 1970 as a museum that epitomizes the lives of the planter elite in antebellum South Carolina, and is operated by the Historic Columbia Foundation. It is located in the Columbia Historic District II.
