= Radical mastectomy =

Removal of cancerous breast

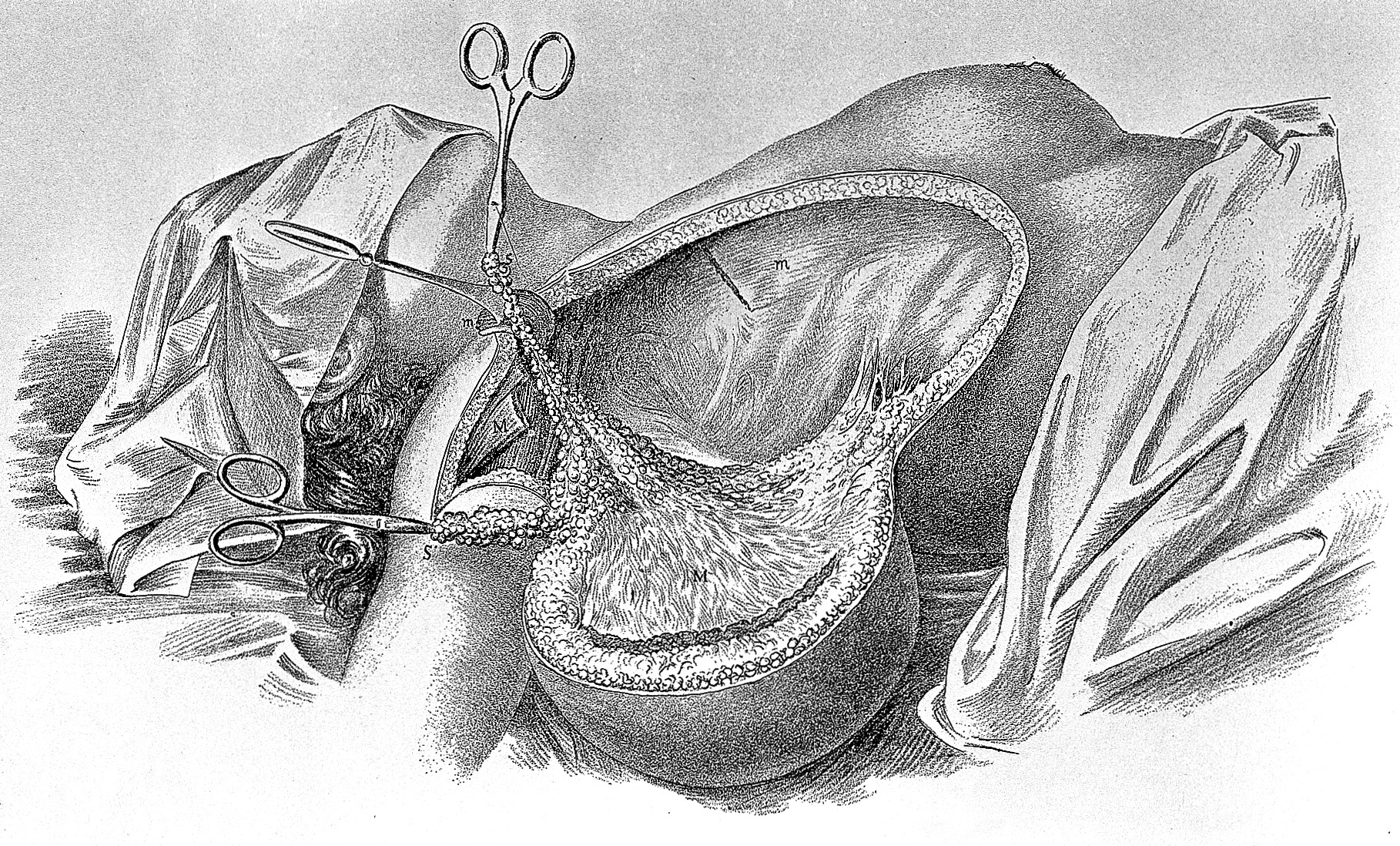
- Radical Mastectomy

Radical mastectomy is a surgical procedure that treats breast cancer by removing the breast and its underlying chest muscle (including pectoralis major and pectoralis minor), and lymph nodes of the axilla (armpit).

Breast cancer is the most common cancer among women. In the early twentieth century it was primarily treated by surgery, which is when the mastectomy was developed. From 1890 to 1971, this invasive procedure was performed solely because it was believed to be the best option. William Halsted, M.D. (one of the first to achieve successful results with the radical mastectomy) and others refused to hear alternative proposals or perform research to conclude their findings; moreover, there was no control group to guide the process of deciding whether radical mastectomies were helping to extend patients' lives.

However, with the advancement of technology and surgical skills in recent years, mastectomies have become less invasive. As of 2016, a combination of radiation therapy and breast-conserving mastectomy are considered optimal treatment.

== Evolution of radical mastectomy ==
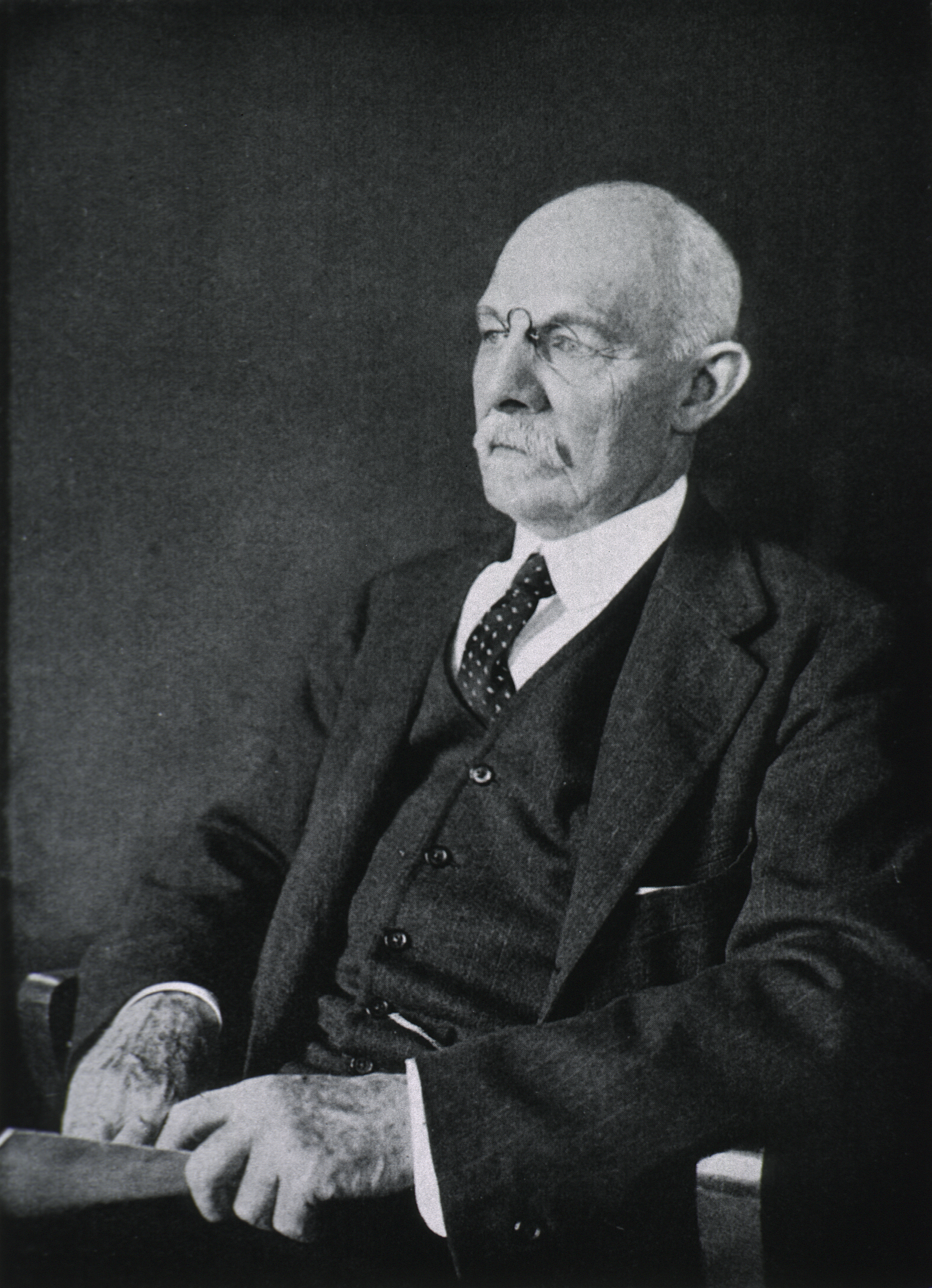
Portrait of William Halsted

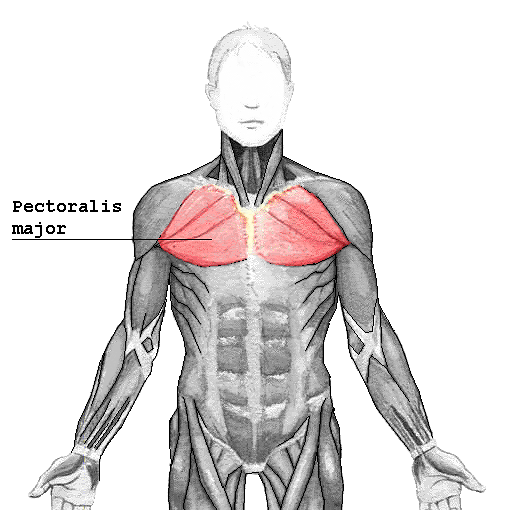
Pectoralis Major

William Halsted and Willy Meyer were the first to achieve successful results with the radical mastectomy, thus ushering in the modern era of surgical treatment for breast cancer. In 1894, Halsted published his work with radical mastectomy from 50 cases at Johns Hopkins between 1889 and 1894. Meyer also published research on radical mastectomy from his interactions with New York patients in December 1894. The en bloc removal of breast tissue became known as the Halsted mastectomy before adopting the term "the complete operation" and eventually, "the radical mastectomy" as it is known today.

Radical mastectomy was based on the then-accepted medical theory that breast cancer spread locally at first, invading nearby tissue and then spreading to surrounding lymph ducts where the cells were "trapped". It was thought that hematogenous spread of tumor cells (metastasis) occurred at a much later stage. Halsted himself believed that cancer spread in a "centrifugal spiral", helping to establish this opinion in the medical community.

Radical mastectomy involves removing all the breast tissue, overlying skin, the pectoralis muscles, and all the axillary lymph nodes. Skin removal was included because the disease involved the skin, which was often ulcerated. The pectoralis muscles were removed not only because the chest wall was involved, but because it was deemed necessary to remove the transpectoral lymphatic pathways. Physicians also believed it was anatomically impossible to do a complete axillary dissection without removing the pectoralis muscles.

== Early recurrence rate statistics ==
Halsted accomplished a three-year recurrence rate of 3% and a 20% locoregional recurrence rate (i.e. return of cancer in the original location or nearby lymph nodes), with no perioperative mortality. The five-year survival rate was 40%, which was twice that of untreated patients.

However, post-operation morbidity rates were high: large wounds were left to heal by granulation, lymphedema was ubiquitous, and arm movement was highly restricted. Thus, chronic pain was prevalent. Because surgeons were faced with such large breast cancers that apparently required drastic treatment, the quality of patient life was not taken into consideration.

Nonetheless, due to Halsted and Meyer's work, some cases of breast cancer were cured and knowledge of the disease began to increase. Standardized treatments were created, and controlled long-term studies were conducted. Soon, however, it became apparent that some women in advanced stages of the disease did not benefit from surgery.

== Staging system development ==
In 1943, leading breast cancer specialists Cushman D. Haagensen, M.D. and A.P. Stout reviewed over 500 patients who had radical mastectomies and identified a group for whom surgery was not a cure, thus developing the concepts of operability and inoperability. Signs of inoperability included skin ulceration, fixation to the chest wall, satellite nodules, edema of the skin (peau d'orange), supraclavicular lymph node enlargement, axillary lymph nodes greater than 2.5 cm, or matted, fixed lymph nodes. This contribution of Haagensen and his colleagues eventually led to development of a clinical breast cancer staging system, the Columbia Clinical Classification, a landmark in the biological study and treatment of breast cancer.

Currently, the TNM staging system (Tumor, Nodes, Metastasis) is the system most frequently used for breast cancer. TNM was developed and is maintained by the Union for International Cancer Control (UICC); it is also used by the American Joint Committee on Cancer (AJCC) and the International Federation of Gynecology and Obstetrics (FIGO). In 1987, the UICC and AJCC staging systems were unified into the single TNM staging system.

== Extended radical mastectomies ==
According to the Halsted-Meyer theory, the major pathway for breast cancer dissemination was through the lymphatic ducts. Therefore, it was thought that performing wider and more mutilating surgeries that removed a greater number of lymph nodes would result in greater chances of cure.

From 1920 onwards, many doctors performed surgeries more invasive than Halsted's original procedure. Sampson Handley noted Halsted's observation of the existence of malignant metastasis to the chest wall and breastbone via the chain of internal mammary nodes under the sternum. He employed an "extended" radical mastectomy that included removal of lymph nodes located there and implantation of radium needles into the anterior intercostal spaces.

This line of study was extended by his son, Richard S. Handley, who studied internal mammary chain nodal involvement in breast cancer and demonstrated that 33% of 150 breast cancer patients had internal mammary chain involvement at the time of surgery. The radical mastectomy was subsequently extended by a number of surgeons such as Sugarbaker and Urban to include removal of internal mammary lymph nodes.

Eventually, this "extended" radical mastectomy was extended further by Dahl-Iversen and Tobiassen to include removal of the supraclavicular lymph nodes. Some surgeons, such as Prudente, went as far as amputating the upper arm en bloc with the mastectomy specimen in an attempt to cure relatively advanced local disease.

This increasingly radical progression culminated in the "super-radical" mastectomy—complete excision of all breast tissue, axillary content, removal of the latissimus dorsi, pectoralis major and minor, and dissection of the internal mammary lymph nodes. After retrospective analysis, extended radical mastectomies were abandoned, as these massive and disabling operations were not proven superior to standard radical mastectomies.

== Decline in radical mastectomies ==
Today, surgeons rarely perform radical mastectomies. A 1977 study by the National Surgical Adjuvant Breast and Bowel Project (NSABP), led by Bernard Fisher, showed there was no statistical difference in survival or recurrence between radical mastectomies and less invasive surgeries.
