= Elizabeth H. Brödel =

American scientific illustrator

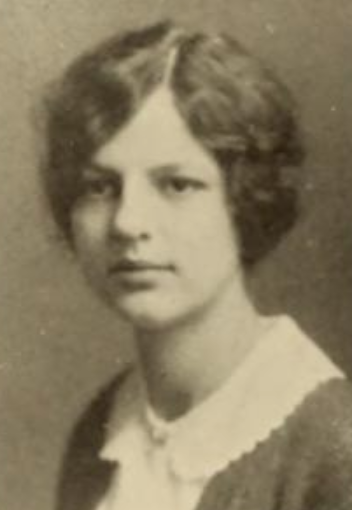
- Brödel in her Smith College yearbook in 1925
- Born: Elizabeth Huntington Brödel; October 9, 1903; Baltimore, Maryland, U.S.
- Died: October 25, 1986 (aged 83); Sandy Spring, Maryland, U.S.
- Other names: Elizabeth Broedel
- Occupation: Scientific illustrator
- Parent: Max Brödel

Elizabeth Huntington Brödel (October 9, 1903 – October 25, 1986), also seen as Elizabeth H. Broedel, was an American medical illustrator and daughter of medical illustrator Max Brödel.

== Early life and education ==
Brödel was born in Baltimore, Maryland, on October 9, 1903, the daughter of Max Brödel and Ruth Marian Huntington Brödel. Both of her parents were scientific illustrators, Her father, originally from Leipzig, Germany, was an innovative medical illustrator based at Johns Hopkins School of Medicine. Her mother, a Smith College graduate, contributed illustrations to the Encyclopaedia of American Horticulture.

Brödel attended the Bryn Mawr School, and graduated from Smith College in 1925. She studied art with her father, and at Hunter College and the Maryland Institute College of Art.

== Career ==
After college, Brödel began working at Johns Hopkins Hospital in Baltimore, where she was a medical illustrator in the gynecology department. She next worked briefly at Duke University Hospital, from 1931 to 1933. She was a medical illustrator at the Cornell Medical Center Lying In Hospital in Manhattan from 1934 until her retirement in 1969. She was a charter member of the Association of Medical Illustrators when it was founded in 1944. She also taught medical illustration.

Brödel illustrated many journal articles and textbooks, including Williams' Obstetrics (1936 edition) and its successor, Stander's Textbook of Obstetrics (1945). Her obstetric illustrations were part of a traveling exhibition in 1945, and at the National Library of Medicine in 1969. Her illustration of the stages of human fetal development reached a wider audience when it appeared in the 1972 Science Year, an annual publication of the World Book Encyclopedia.

== Personal life ==
Brödel died in 1986, aged 83 years, in Sandy Spring, Maryland. In 1987 she was posthumously awarded the first Ranice W. Crosby Distinguished Achievement Award by the Johns Hopkins School of Medicine, "for scholarly contributions to the advancement of art as applied to the sciences".
