= Coquille =

Coquille, the French word for "shell" (like an oyster shell), can refer to:

== People ==
- Coquille people, a Native American tribe in Oregon
- Coquille Indian Tribe, a federally recognized Native American tribal entity in Oregon
- Guy Coquille (1523–1603), French jurist

== Places ==
- Coquille, Oregon, a city in the U.S. state of Oregon
- La Coquille, a village and commune in the Dordogne département of western France
- Coquille River (Oregon), a river in Oregon
- Coquille River (Normandin River), a tributary of Nicabau Lake in Quebec, Canada

== Ships ==
- Coquille (steamboat), a 1908 propeller-driven steamboat in Oregon, United States
- French frigate Coquille (1795), French Navy ship later renamed HMS Coquille
- French ship Astrolabe (1811), originally christened Coquille

== Other uses ==
- Coquille Saint-Jacques, "Shell of Saint James", in French, the scallop itself, as well as the preparation of scallops in cream sauce
- Coquille, a dialect of the Tututni language
- Coquille board, a type of textured drawing paper
- Coquille (film), a 1999 Japanese romantic drama film
