= Carbon dust =

2D-art technique

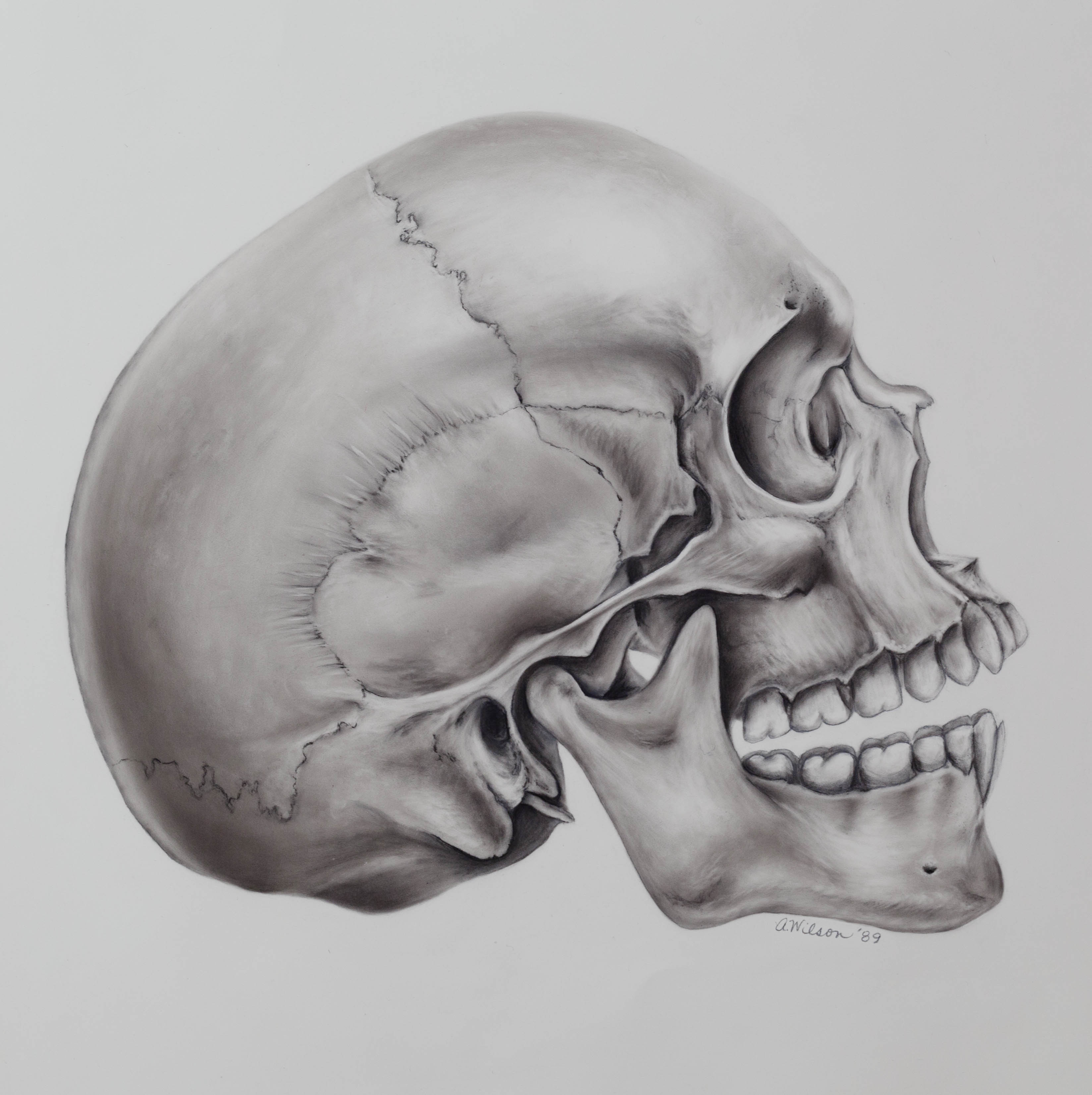
Carbon dust illustration

Carbon dust is an artistic technique in which carbon dust is applied to a surface via dry brushes. Highlights may be painted on or scratched out later in the process. Dust is prepared by rubbing carbon pencils against an abrasive surface, such as a metal file. The technique was popularized by Max Brödel (1870-1941) and became widely used among medical and scientific illustrators in the twentieth century.

Brödel described his technique in detail while drafting a proposed book on medical illustration, that was later published as an appendix in his biography.

Very early in his career he employed several traditional drawing and wash techniques to render illustrations. Dissatisfied with traditional techniques he explored other means of rendering that would allow him to realistically render the brilliant highlights and fine fibers of living tissue. In 1894 after arriving in Baltimore and after some experimentation he began using the dust of Wolff carbon pencils applied to Ross .00 stipple board. Ross board was similar to coquille board and was coated with chalk, that was textured with fine bumps or stipples that helped hold the dust on the surface and aided reproduction for printing. The chalk coating allowed for multiple scratches to create highlights and rework of the dust. Brödel preferred sable brushes for applying dust. To smudge and erase the applied dust he used a variety of customized tools. He modified sable brushes to shorten the bristles to increase their stiffness. He carved rubber erasers, bits of cork and chamois, then secured them in brass charcoal holders for use on drawings. For scratching he modified an engraving tool. Holding this tool at various angles allowed him to vary the width of a scratch. Later illustrators have used scalpels and knives for scratching.

Ross stipple board went out of production. Some illustrators used other types of coated boards. Other illustrators worked on paper and painted highlights on their work. Newer drafting films were adopted and allowed for scratched highlights. Carbon dust has also been combined with washes and pencils.
