= Awl =

Awl may refer to:

== Tools ==
- Bradawl, a woodworking hand tool for making small holes
- Scratch awl, a woodworking layout and point-making tool used to scribe a line
- Stitching awl, a tool for piercing holes in a variety of materials such as leather or canvases

== Biology ==
- Butterfly species called "awl", of the family Hesperiidae
  - Awls, genus Hasora
- Awl-flies, family Xylophagidae
- Awl nematode, or genus Dolichodorus

== People ==
- Aime M. Awl (1887–1973), American scientific illustrator
- Farah Awl (1937–1991), Somali writer
- William Maclay Awl (1799–1876), American psychiatrist and politician

== Other uses ==
- AA-4 'Awl', the NATO reporting name for the Raduga K-9 air-to-air missile
- Academic Word List, a word frequency list from a broad range of academic texts
- Alaska Wilderness League, a U.S. nonprofit organization
- Alliance for Workers' Liberty, a Trotskyist group in Britain
- Arizona Winter League, a former instructional baseball league
- The Awl, a current events and culture website in New York City
- Statement List (German: Anweisungsliste (AWL)), an instruction list language of Siemens
- Alas Nacionales, a former airline, ICAO airline code AWL

== See also ==
- Owl (disambiguation)
- Aul, a type of fortified village found throughout the Caucasus mountains and Central Asia
- Ahlspiess or awl pike, a 15th–16th century thrusting spear
