= Frank H. Netter =

American surgeon and medical illustrator (1906–1991)

- Born: 25 April 1906; Brooklyn, New York
- Died: 17 September 1991 (aged 85)
- Education: New York University School of Medicine
- Known for: Netter's Atlas of Human Anatomy
- Medical career
- Profession: Physician; surgeon
- Sub-specialties: Medical illustrator

Frank Henry Netter (25 April 1906 – 17 September 1991) was an American surgeon and medical illustrator. The first edition of his Atlas of Human Anatomy — his "personal Sistine Chapel" — was published in 1989; he was a fellow of the New York Academy of Medicine, where he was first published in 1957.

== Biography ==
=== Early life, training, and medical career ===
Frank Henry Netter was born in Manhattan at 53rd Street and Seventh Avenue, and grew up wanting to be an artist. In high school, he obtained a scholarship to study at the National Academy of Design, doing so at night while continuing high school. After further studying at the Art Students League of New York and with private teachers, he began a commercial art career, quickly achieving success and doing work for the Saturday Evening Post and The New York Times. However, his family disapproved of a career as an artist and he agreed to study medicine. After getting a degree at the City College of New York, he completed medical school at New York University and a surgical internship at Bellevue Hospital and attempted to begin practicing medicine. However, as Netter put it: "This was in 1933—the depths of the Depression—and there was no such thing as medical practice. If a patient ever wandered into your office by mistake, he didn't pay."

=== Early medical art career ===
Having continued doing freelance art during his medical training, including some work for his professors, he fell back on medical art to supplement his income. In particular, pharmaceutical companies began seeking Netter for illustrations to help sell new products, such as Novocain. Soon after a misunderstanding wherein Netter asked for $1,500 for a series of 5 pictures and an advertising manager agreed to and paid $1,500 each—$7,500 for the series—Netter gave up the practice of medicine.

=== Career with CIBA ===
In 1936, the CIBA Pharmaceutical Company commissioned a small work from him, a fold-up illustration of a heart to promote the sale of digitalis. This proved hugely popular with physicians, and a reprint without the advertising copy was even more popular.

Quickly following on the success of the fold-up heart, fold-up versions of other organs were produced. Netter then proposed that a series of pathology illustrations be produced. These illustrations were distributed to physicians as cards in a folder, with advertising for CIBA products on the inside of the folder, and were also popular with physicians. CIBA then collected these illustrations in book form, producing the CIBA Collection of Medical Illustrations, which ultimately comprised 8 volumes (13 books).

Beginning in 1948, CIBA also re-used illustrations by Netter in another series of materials to be given to physicians, the Clinical Symposia series. These were small magazine-like brochures that typically featured an extensive article on a medical condition, commonly with about a dozen of Netter's illustrations. This series was produced until 1999. In 1989, Netter's Atlas of Human Anatomy was published, assembled from his previous paintings and correlated by updated diagrams.

Netter's career was described in a commemorative video by Ciba-Geigy in 1988.

== Skepticism ==
Netter was skeptical of the claims of alternative medicine and fad diets. He wrote Fad Diets Can Be Deadly (1975), which debunked the misleading claims of fad diets.

== Legacy ==
In all, Netter produced nearly 4,000 illustrations, which have been included in countless publications. In perspective, that number represents an image researched, sketched, and completely painted for every three business days for over 50 years.

The vast bulk of Netter's illustrations were produced for and owned by CIBA Pharmaceutical Company and its successor, CIBA-Geigy, which has since merged with Sandoz Laboratories to become Novartis. In June 2000, Novartis sold its interest in Netter's works to MediMedia USA's subsidiary Icon Learning Systems, which in turn has sold the portfolio to Elsevier, which continues to make his work available in various formats. His Atlas of Human Anatomy and other atlases have become a staple of medical education.

Dr. Netter's contribution to the study of human anatomy is epochal. He has advanced our understanding of anatomy more than any other medical illustrator since the 16th century, when Vesalius introduced drawings based on cadaveric dissections.

— Dr. Michael DeBakey

The Frank H. Netter M.D. School of Medicine at Quinnipiac University in North Haven, Connecticut opened its doors in 2013.

== Awards and honors ==
- 1966, Townsend Harris Medal, City College of New York
- 1969, The Harold Swanberg Distinguished Service Award, American Medical Writers Association
- 1973, Distinguished Service Award, National Kidney Foundation
- 1979, Resolution of Commendation, Florida State Legislature
- 1981, Distinguished Service Award, American College of Cardiology
- 1981, Honorary Degree, Doctor of Science, New Jersey College of Medicine and Dentistry
- 1985, Honorary Degree, Doctor of Science, Georgetown University
- 1986, Life Achievement Award, Society of Illustrators
- 1986, The Solomon A. Berson Medical Alumni Achievement Award, New York University School of Medicine
- 1986, Honorary Degree, Doctor of Science, Université de Sherbrooke, Canada
- 1986, Lifetime Achievement Award, Association of Medical Illustrators
- 1986, Dedication of the Netter Library, CIBA-Geigy Corporation
- 1987, Honorary Member, Radiological Society of North America
- 1988, Honorary Award for Contribution to Knowledge of Musculoskeletal System, American Academy of Orthopedic Surgeons
- 1988, Honorary Fellowship, Medical Artists Association of Great Britain
- 1990, Award of Special Recognition, Association of Medical Illustrators
- 1990, Honorary Member Award, American Association of Clinical Anatomists

== Selected publications ==
- Fad Diets Can Be Deadly: The Safe, Sure Way to Weight Loss and Good Nutrition (1975)
- Clinical Symposia: Surgical Anatomy of the Hand (1988)
- The Netter Collection of Medical Illustrations (1994) [with Richard Parker]
- Interactive Atlas of Clinical Anatomy: The Clear, Easy Way to Put Anatomy Into Practice (1997)
- The Ciba Collection of Medical Illustrations (1983)
- Atlas of Human Anatomy (1989, 2010)

== Bibliography ==
- Frank H. Netter (January 1981), "Frank Netter: The Man, The Artist, The Surgeon", Medical Times (condensed reprint from The Saturday Evening Post, 1976)
- The Five Senses, CIBA-Geigy Corporation, 1992, ASIN B00A17MKVE (memorial portfolio and essays)
- Netter, Francine Mary (his daughter) (2013). Medicine's Michelangelo: The Life & Art of Frank H. Netter, MD. Quinnipiac University Press. ISBN 978-0989137607.
