= Johns Hopkins Hospital Historical Club =

Former medical society

The Johns Hopkins Hospital Historical Club was a United States society devoted to studying the history of medicine. Founded on 10 November 1890 by more than 30 people including William Osler, William H. Welch, William Stewart Halsted, and Howard A. Kelly, its first meeting was held at the library of the Johns Hopkins Hospital, Baltimore, on 30 November. As a precursor to the William H. Welch Institute of the History of Medicine founded at Johns Hopkins in 1929, the Historical Club was instrumental to the development of the discipline of medical history.
