= Brodel's bloodless line =

Brodel's line, also known as Brodel's white line, is a relatively avascular line between the anterior and posterior segmental branches of the renal artery of the body. It has been proved that Brodel's line is also vascular.

Josef Hyrtl, in 1882, and Max Brödel, in 1902, described this relatively avascular plane near the midline (5 mm posterior) of the convex border of the kidney through which the collecting system of the kidney could be entered.

In continental Europe, credit for the plane was given to Hyrtl; in the United Kingdom and the United States it was called the Brödel bloodless line or the Brödel white line.

This plane is used for nephrolithotomy, more specifically while performing anatrophic nephrolithotomy.
