= Maria Torrence Wishart =

Canadian medical illustrator

- Born: September 6, 1893; Toronto, Ontario, Canada
- Died: December 30, 1982 (aged 89); Toronto, Ontario, Canada
- Burial place: Mount Pleasant Cemetery
- Education: Johns Hopkins School of Medicine
- Occupation: Medical illustrator

Maria Torrence Wishart (September 6, 1893 – December 30, 1982) was a Canadian medical illustrator and the founder of the University of Toronto's Art as Applied to Medicine program. She was educated at Johns Hopkins School of Medicine under Max Brödel, and in 1925 returned to Canada to found the Department of Medical Art Service in the Faculty of Medicine.

== Early life and education ==
Wishart was born September 6, 1893, to an affluent family in Edwardian Toronto. Her interest in medicine was influenced by her grandfather and father, who were both doctors. Wishart's brother, D. E. Staunton Wishart, was also a doctor who taught at the University of Toronto and served as the head of the ear, nose and throat department at the Hospital for Sick Children. After travelling in Europe, she returned to North America with the outbreak of WWI, and studied art in Massachusetts. In 1922 she moved to Baltimore to study with the renowned German medical illustrator Max Brödel in the Department of Art as Applied to Medicine at the Johns Hopkins School of Medicine. The training in Baltimore emphasized anatomical, pathological, and surgical illustration.

== Career ==
In 1925 after moving back to Toronto, Wishart was appointed as an "artiste" in the Faculty of Medicine, University of Toronto. She founded, and was the first director of, the Department of Medical Art Service at the Faculty of Medicine, University of Toronto. She was the sole illustrator of all surgical and anatomical work for the first ten years of the service. In addition to artwork, Wishart also created wax models of human body parts, produced to scale, to allow for four-dimensional instruction. Dorothy Foster Chubb, another of Max Brödel's students, assisted Wishart as an illustrator from 1931 to 1939, before accepting a position with John C. Boileau Grant as an illustrator for his An Atlas of Anatomy. Chubb was replaced by Eila Hopper-Ross, who worked with Wishart until 1945.

In 1945 Wishart founded a three year diploma in medical illustration, the basis for the university's Master of Science in Biomedical Communications program. During a 1949 address to the University Women's Club, regarding medical illustration as a career, she explained that in addition to high academic achievement and fine art training "[t]he medical illustrator must be activated by to success by the desire to search for truth."

Wishart retired from the University of Toronto in 1962, succeeded by Nancy Joy. Following her retirement she pursued continuing education courses and worked as a sculptor. She died December 30 1982, at the age of 89 and was buried in a family plot at Mount Pleasant Cemetery in Toronto.
