= Charles Sykes =

Charles Sykes may refer to:

- Sir Charles Sykes, 1st Baronet (1868–1950), British wool merchant and politician
- Charles Robinson Sykes (1875–1950), British sculptor
- Charles H. Sykes (1881–1966), American member of the Wisconsin State Assembly
- Charles Henry Sykes (1882–1942), American cartoonist
- Sir Charles Sykes (metallurgist) (1905–1982), British metallurgist, president of the Physical Society
- Charlie Sykes (born 1954), American talk radio host and political commentator
