= William H. Welch =

American physician (1850–1934)

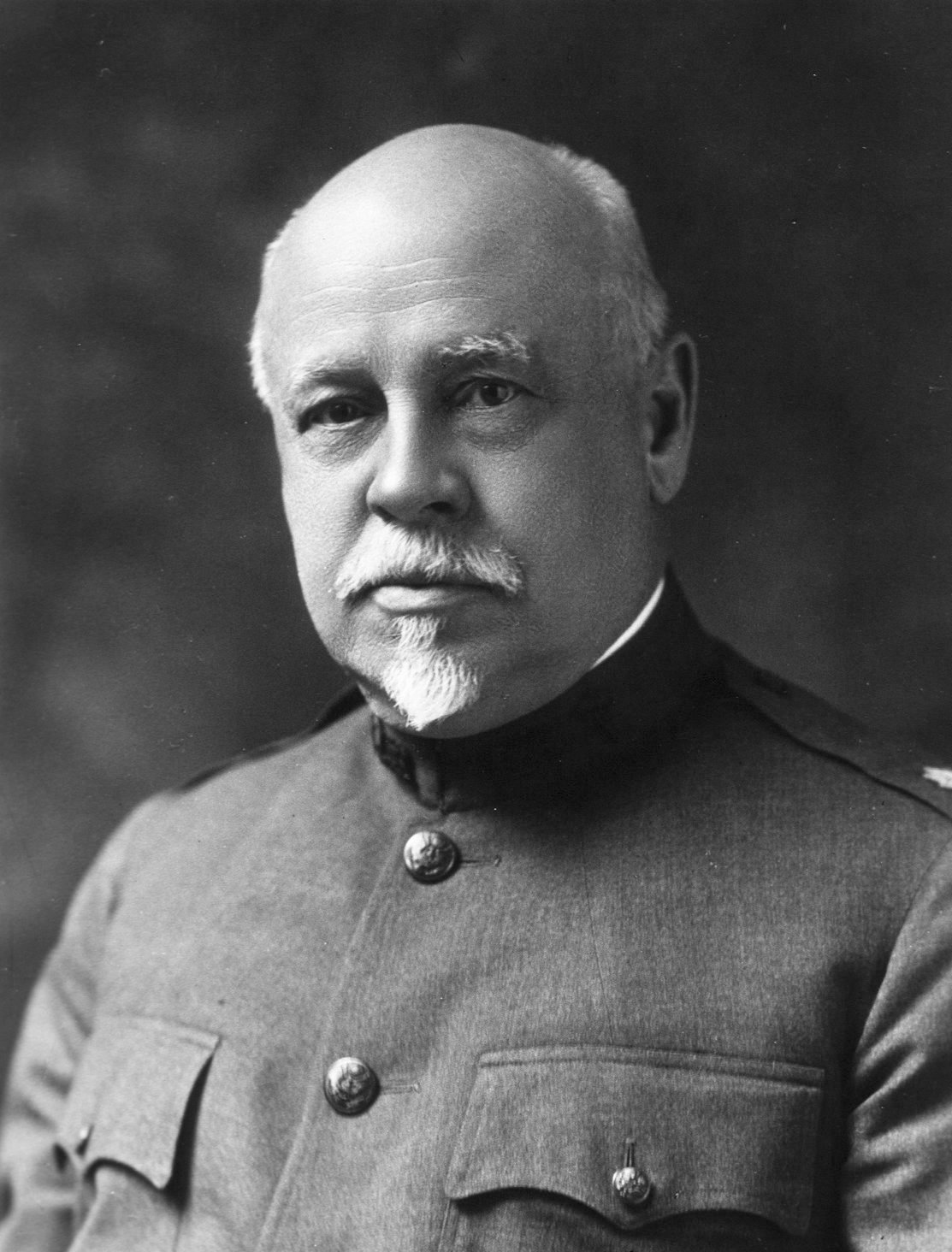
- Welch as brigadier general circa 1917-1921

1st Dean of Johns Hopkins School of Medicine and School of Public Health

Personal details
- Born: April 8, 1850 Norfolk, Connecticut
- Died: April 30, 1934 (aged 84) Johns Hopkins Hospital; Baltimore, Maryland
- Education: Yale University (BA); Columbia University (MD)
- Occupation: Physician, pathologist
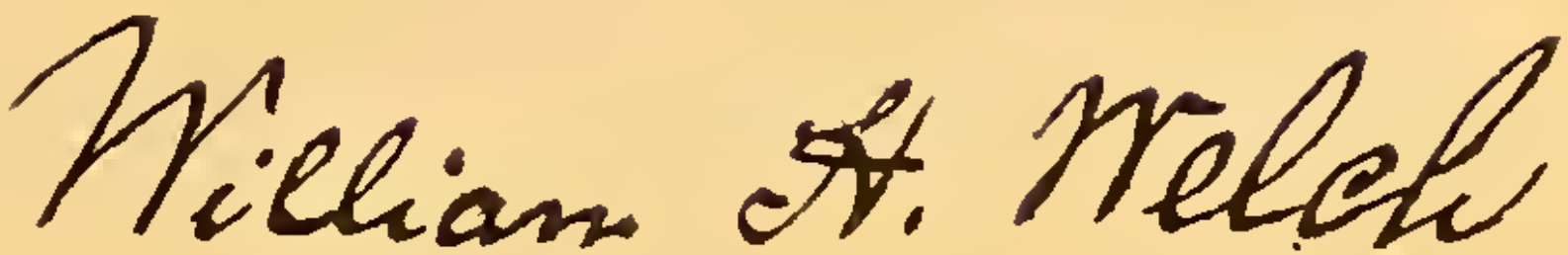
- Signature

William Henry Welch (April 8, 1850 – April 30, 1934) was an American physician, pathologist, bacteriologist, and medical-school administrator. He was one of the "Big Four" founding professors at the Johns Hopkins Hospital. He was the first dean of the Johns Hopkins School of Medicine and was also the founder of the Johns Hopkins School of Hygiene and Public Health, the first school of public health in the country. Welch was more known for his cogent summations of current scientific work, than his own scientific research. The Johns Hopkins medical school library is also named after Welch. In his lifetime, he was called the "Dean of American Medicine" and received various awards and honors throughout his lifetime and posthumously.

== Biography ==
=== Early life ===
He was born on April 8, 1850, to William Wickham Welch and Emeline Collin Welch in Norfolk, Connecticut. He had a long family history of physicians and surgeons, starting with his grandfather Benjamin Welch. Benjamin was also on the medical forefront of his time, establishing his county's medical association. William H. Welch was educated at Norfolk Academy and the Winchester Institute, a boarding school. His father and a grandfather and four of his uncles were all physicians. William Henry entered Yale University in 1866, where he studied Greek and classics. Initially, Welch was not interested in becoming a physician; his primary ambition was to teach the Greek language. He received an Bachelor's of Arts degree in 1870. As an undergraduate, he joined the Skull and Bones fraternity.

Welch remained a lifelong bachelor. He was the uncle of Senator Frederic C. Walcott.

=== Early career ===
After a short period of teaching high-school students in Norwich, New York, Welch went to study medicine at the Columbia University College of Physicians and Surgeons, in Manhattan. In 1875, he received his MD. From 1876 to 1877, he studied at several German laboratories to work with, among others, Julius Cohnheim. This experience abroad prompted Welch to model his plans for a new medical institute on the Institute of the History of Medicine at the University of Leipzig. He returned to America in 1877 and opened a laboratory at Bellevue Medical College (now a part of New York University Medical School).

=== Later career at Johns Hopkins ===
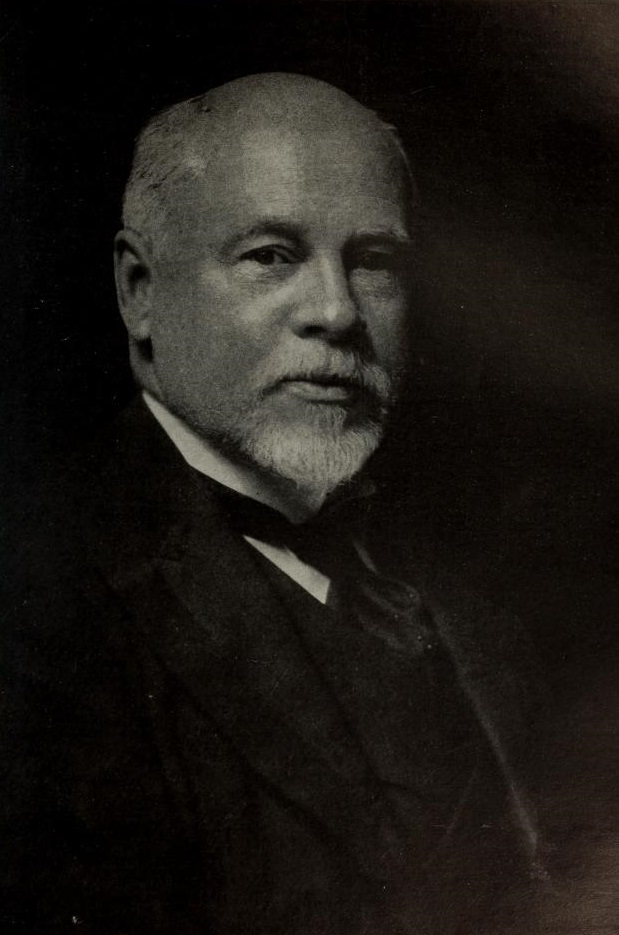
Welch is widely known at the time for his pathology residency program, which later attracted many bright minds from across the country.

In 1884, he was the first physician recruited to be a professor at the newly forming Johns Hopkins Hospital and Medical School at Johns Hopkins University in Baltimore. By 1886, he had 16 graduate physicians working in his laboratory – the first postgraduate training program for physicians in the country. He helped the trustees recruit the other founding physicians for the hospital – William Stewart Halsted, William Osler, and Howard Kelly. Welch became head of the Department of Pathology when the hospital opened in 1889. In 1893, he also became the first dean of the Johns Hopkins University School of Medicine, and in 1916, he established and led the Johns Hopkins School of Hygiene and Public Health, the first school of public health in the country. During this time, Welch was also involved in creating a new medical library for Johns Hopkins. He embarked on a sabbatical in Europe, where he visited the University of Leipzig's Institute and various other universities, as well as libraries and bookstores. These German institutions influenced Welch's design for the Institute of the History of Medicine at Johns Hopkins, which was established in October 1929. The new institute also built on the already existing Johns Hopkins Hospital Historical Club (est. 1890), of which Welch had been a co-founder. Welch is also the founding editor-in-chief of the American Journal of Epidemiology.

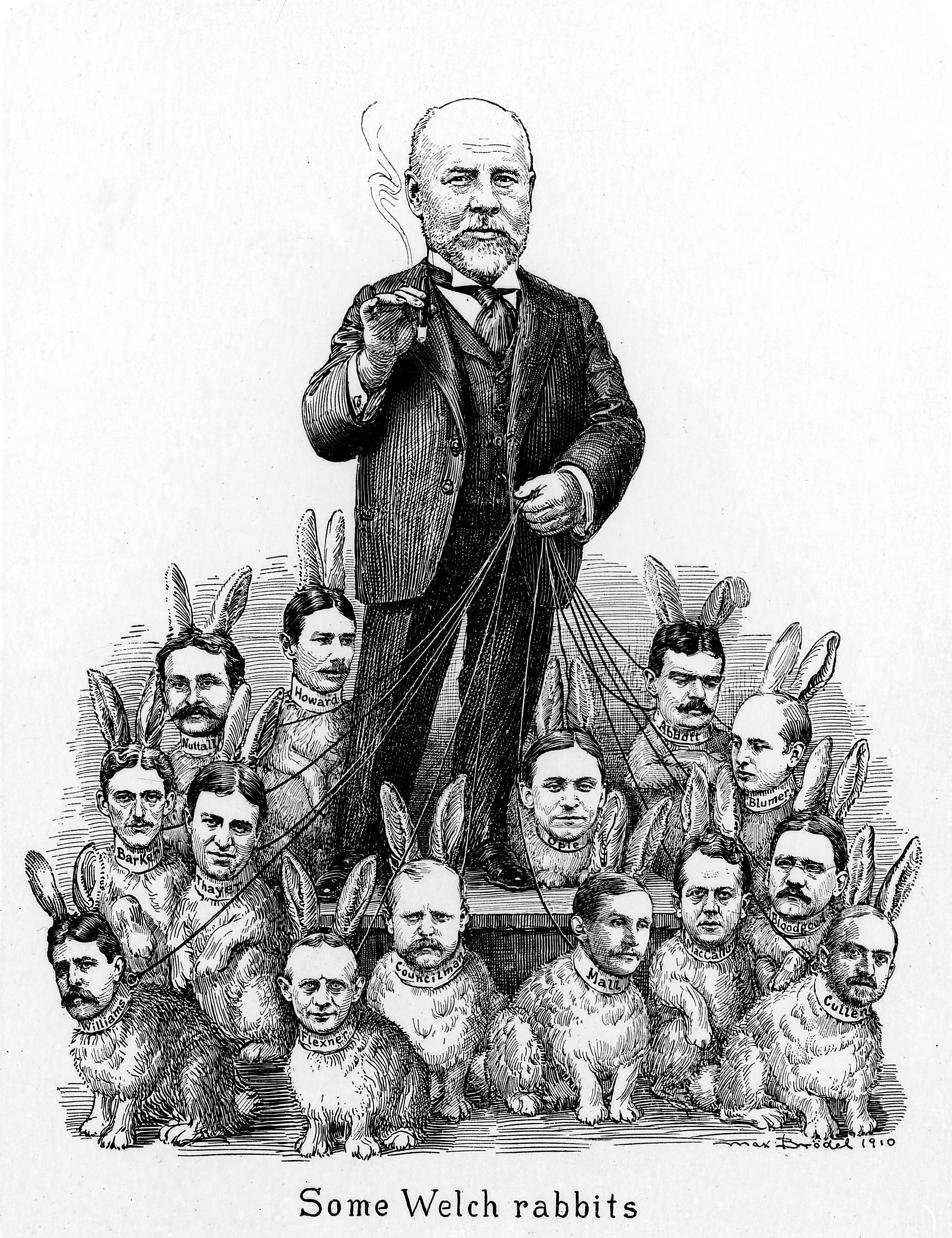
Caricature of William Welch with his students, by Max Brödel, 1910

Graduates of Welch's training programs were highly coveted as academic physicians. Medical schools and institutes across the country vied for Welch's former students and graduate scientists to fill top posts. Many of his residents went on to become highly prominent physicians, including Walter Reed, co-discoverer of the cause of yellow fever, Simon Flexner, founding director of the Rockefeller Institute for Medical Research, and future Nobel laureates George Whipple and Peyton Rous.

Welch's research was principally in bacteriology, and he is the discoverer of the organism that causes gas gangrene. It was named Clostridium welchii in recognition of that fact, but now the organism usually is designated as Clostridium perfringens.

From 1901 to 1933, he was founding president of the Board of Scientific Directors at the Rockefeller Institute for Medical Research. He was an instrumental reformer of medical education in the United States, as well as a president of the National Academy of Sciences from 1913–1917. He also was president of the American Medical Association, the Association of American Physicians, the History of Science Society, the Congress of American Physicians and Surgeons, the Society of American Bacteriologists, and the Maryland State Board of Health. Welch was a founding editor of the Journal of Experimental Medicine.

Welch served in the U.S. Army Medical Corps during World War I, and played a major role in the response to the 1918 Influenza Pandemic. He remained in the Reserve Corps for three years thereafter, attaining the rank of brigadier general (O7). For his service during the war, Welch received the Distinguished Service Medal.

=== Death ===
Welch died on April 30, 1934, at the age of 84, of prostatic adenocarcinoma at Johns Hopkins Hospital.

== Honors and awards ==
- Welch was awarded the first ever gold-headed cane of the American Association of Pathologists and Bacteriologists.
- Welch was elected to the American Philosophical Society in 1896.
- Welch was elected to the American Academy of Arts and Sciences in 1897.
- Welch was awarded the Royal Order of the Crown of Prussia in 1911.
- In 1927, Welch received the Kober Medal from the American Association of Physicians.
- The William H. Welch Medical Library at Johns Hopkins, which opened in 1929, is named after him.
- In 1931, Welch received the Harben Medal from the Royal Institute of Public Health for his professorship in the history of medicine.
- In 1950, the first William H. Welch Medal was awarded by American Association for the History of Medicine to honor authors in field of medical history.
- Welch Road, in the vicinity of Stanford University Medical Center in Stanford, California, is named in his honor.

== See also ==
- William H. Welch House
