= Garnet Jex =

American painter

Garnet Wolesey Jex
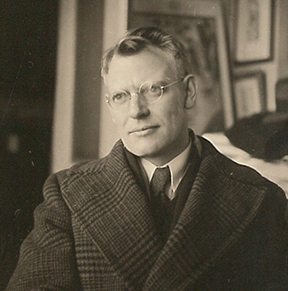
- Born: October 19, 1895; Kent, Ohio
- Died: September 27, 1979 (aged 83); Washington, DC
- Education: Corcoran College of Art and Design, George Washington University
- Known for: Medical illustration, watercolor painting
- Style: Representational painting

Portrait of Olive Thorne Miller, collection of the National Portrait Gallery, Smithsonian Institution

Garnet Wolesey Jex (October 19, 1895 – September 21, 1979) was an American artist and historian. Born in Kent, Ohio, he moved with his family to Washington, D.C., at the age of four. He remained in the Washington area until his death.

Jex enlisted in the U.S. Army in World War I. After the war, he worked as a medical illustrator for the Army Medical Corps for two years and attended the Corcoran College of Art and Design. He earned a BA in 1927 and a Master's degree in 1931, both from George Washington University. While completing his master's degree, he worked as an art editor for the journal Nature. Later, Jex was employed as the Director of Graphics for the U.S. Bureau of State Services, and worked as an artist and designer at the United States Public Health Service for 26 years, until his retirement in 1962.

In 1965, Jex authored a history book of the American Civil War entitled The Upper Potomac in the Civil War, based on a series of 51 watercolor paintings. Jex also known for his paintings of dinosaurs and other Permian Age animals including those created for dioramas at the Dallas Exposition on behalf of the United States Texas Centennial Commission, and at the National Museum of Natural History for which he painted a 15 foot long mural.

Jex was highly renowned for his landscape paintings of the Potomac River and the C & O Canal. Although a flood destroyed the canal in 1924, Jex's works remain as a visual record of the once commercially important structure. While many of Jex’s works are held in private collections, others can be found on public display at the Smithsonian American Art Museum and at Harpers Ferry National Historical Park.

== Collections ==
- Smithsonian American Art Museum
- National Portrait Gallery, Washington DC
- Harpers Ferry National Historical Park
- Kiplinger Collection, Historical Society of Washington, DC
- National Museum of Health and Medicine, Otis Historical Archives, Jex Medical Illustration Collection
- Museum of the Shenandoah Valley
