= Charles Henry Sykes =

American cartoonist

Charles H. Sykes
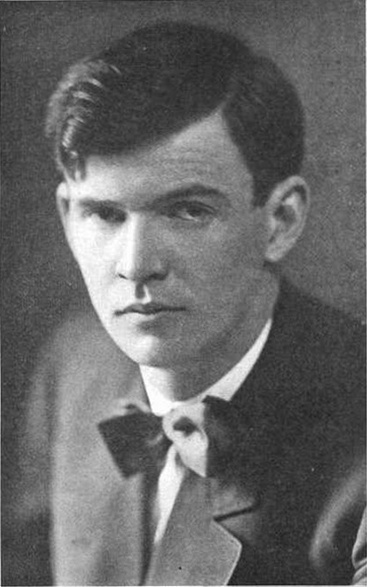
- Born: November 12, 1882; Athens, Alabama, U.S.
- Died: December 19, 1942 (aged 60); Philadelphia, Pennsylvania, U.S.
- Education: Drexel Institute
- Known for: Cartooning
- Notable work: Editorial cartoons for the Public Ledger and Evening Ledger
- Style: Editorial cartooning
- Spouse: Charlotte Kennedy Hannum
- Awards: National Headliner Award (1941)

Signature
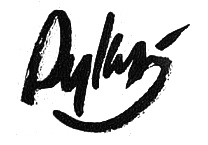

Charles Henry "Bill" Sykes (November 12, 1882 – December 19, 1942) was an American cartoonist associated with the Philadelphia Public Ledger and Evening Ledger from 1911 until its closing in 1942.

Born in Athens, Alabama, to William Henry and Jane Palmyra Sykes (nee Hayes), Sykes attended the Drexel Institute in Philadelphia, graduating in 1904. He did freelance work for two years before entering newspaper work in 1906, with the Philadelphia North American and Williamsport News. He then worked for the Nashville Banner in Tennessee until 1911 before joining the Public Ledger later that same year. When the Public Ledger was reorganized into the Evening Ledger in 1914, he became that paper's first editorial cartoonist, and remained its only cartoonist until its dissolution in early 1942. He married Charlotte Kennedy Hannum on September 11, 1907. He was an editorial cartoonist for Life magazine from 1922 to 1928. He also designed insignia for several army units, and received a National Headliner Award in 1941.

During World War I, Sykes became widely known for patriotic cartoons supporting American war mobilization, liberty bond drives, and military preparedness. His cartoons were frequently reprinted in newspapers outside Philadelphia and used in public promotional campaigns. Several of his wartime illustrations were distributed nationally by government and civic organizations.

In addition to newspaper cartooning, Sykes contributed artwork and insignia concepts for military organizations during both the interwar period and the early years of World War II. His heraldic and emblematic designs reflected his strong interest in symbolism and draftsmanship.

Sykes's early work was distinguished by usage of coquille board for shading. His later work incorporated crayon and wash. Cartoon historian Richard Marschall described Sykes's technique as "one of the most amiable styles in all cartooning. His perspectives were unique, his anatomy precise, and his shading almost theatrical." A 1918 cartoon promoting the fourth Liberty Loan won a gold medal from the Liberty Loan Committee.

His editorial work frequently addressed international affairs, urban political reform, corruption, labor disputes, and American foreign policy. Unlike many editorial cartoonists of his era, Sykes emphasized detailed realism and expressive lighting effects rather than caricature-heavy compositions. His illustrations were noted for cinematic staging and elaborate visual metaphor.

In 1980, over 300 of his cartoons and sketches were donated to Virginia Commonwealth University. The collection includes editorial cartoons, preliminary sketches, correspondence, and examples of his commercial and military-related artwork. The archive has been used by historians studying early twentieth-century American political illustration and newspaper culture.

== Legacy ==
Sykes is regarded as one of the prominent American editorial cartoonists of the early twentieth century. His work bridged the stylistic transition between nineteenth-century pen-and-ink political illustration and the more painterly newspaper cartooning that emerged during the interwar years. His cartoons documenting American responses to World War I and World War II remain important examples of wartime visual journalism.

Select cartoons
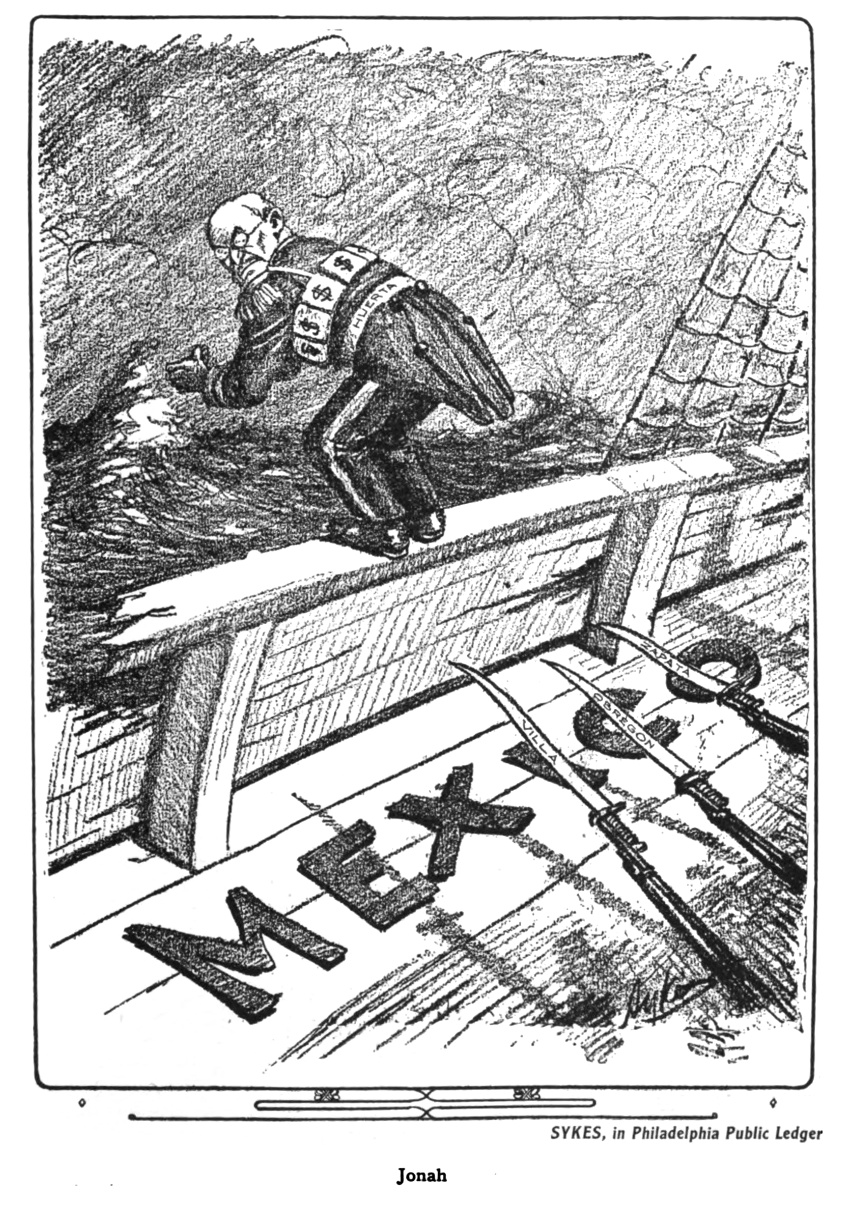
"Jonah" (1914). Commentary on the ouster of Mexican president Victoriano Huerta

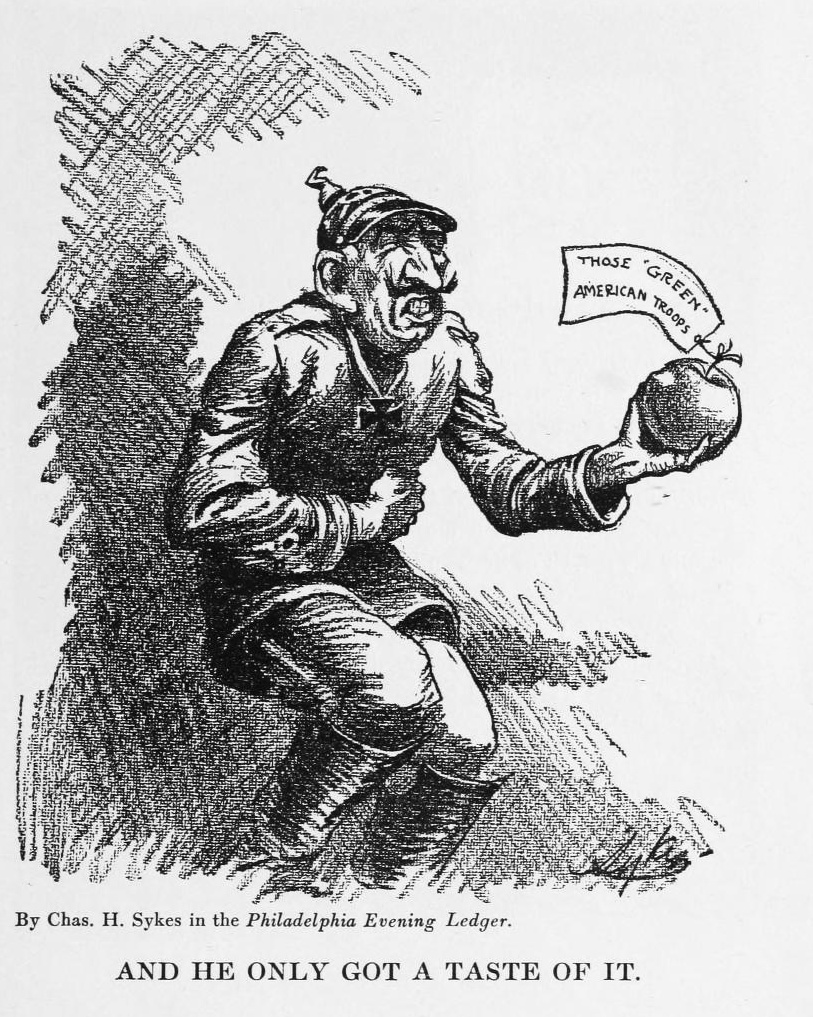
"And He Only Got a Taste of It". Commentary on German reaction to American troops in World War I

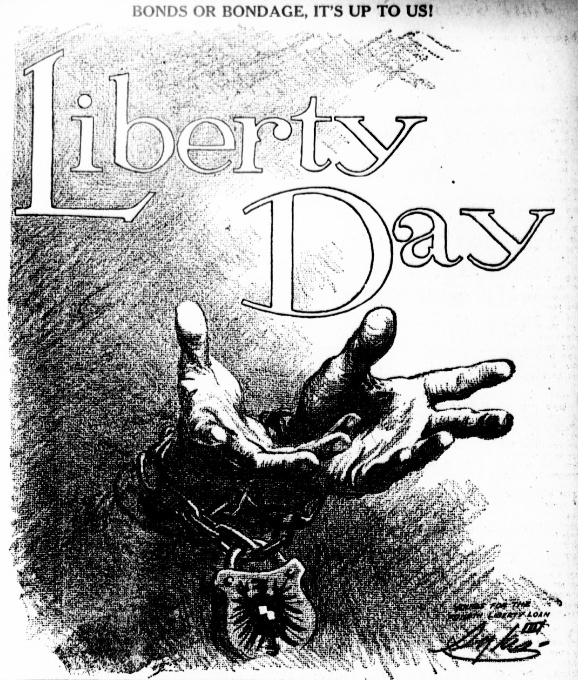
Award-winning cartoon promoting liberty bonds
