= Kensington Hospital =

Coordinates: 39.98176°N 75.13473°W

Geography
- Location: Philadelphia, Pennsylvania

Links
- Website: kensingtonhospital.org

Kensington Hospital, formerly known as Kensington Hospital for Women, is the 2nd oldest, and last remaining independent hospital in Philadelphia, Pennsylvania. The hospital was established in 1887 by Howard A. Kelly, MD, who later became one of the founding professors at the Johns Hopkins Hospital and the chair of gynecological surgery of the Johns Hopkins School of Medicine. The hospital was added to the Philadelphia Register of Historic Places in 2019.

== History ==
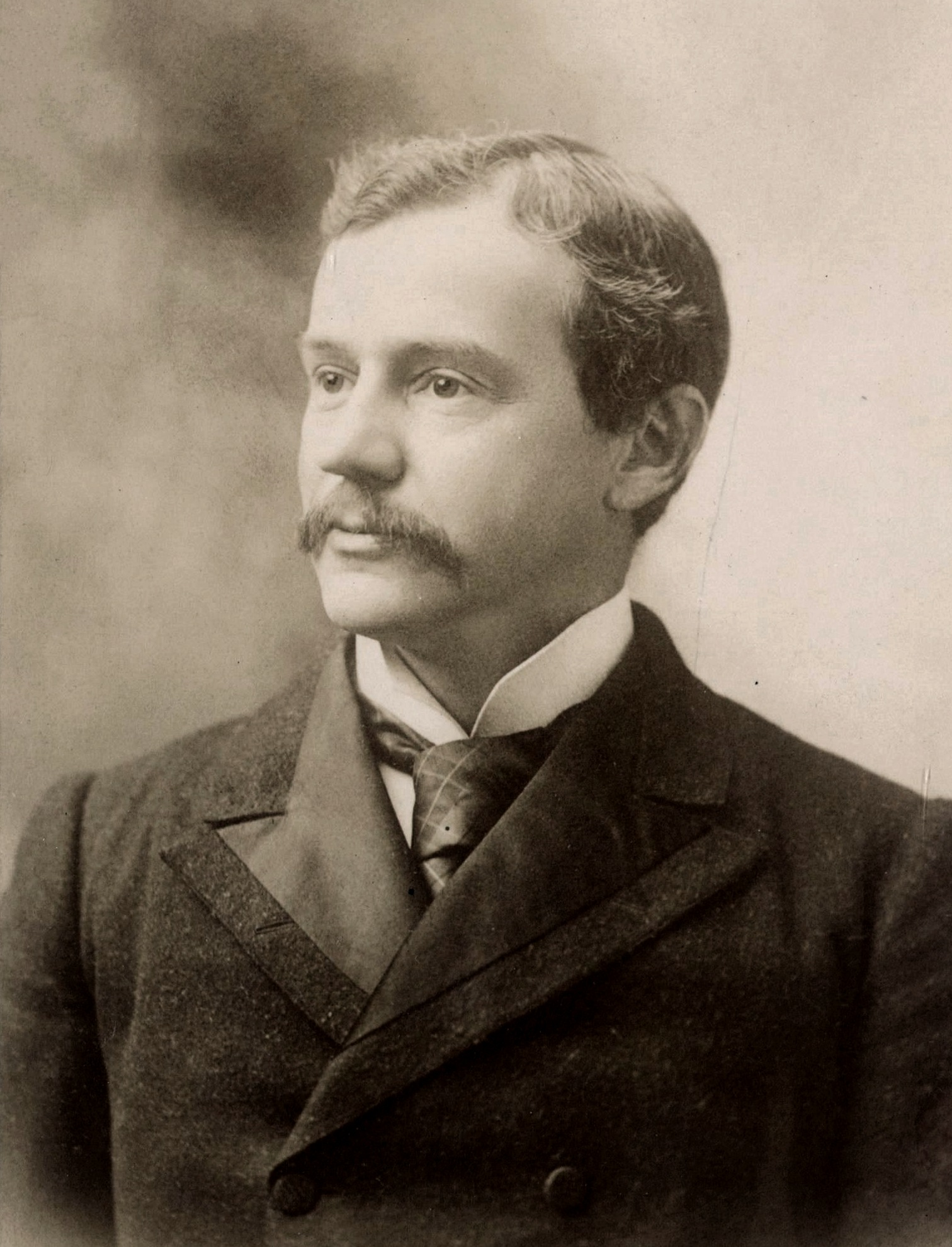
Howard A. Kelly

In the mid 1880s, Dr. Howard A. Kelly opened a gynecological clinic on Diamond Street in the Kensington neighborhood of Philadelphia with the goal of providing access to healthcare for working-class women. He purchased a mansion on Kensington's Norris Square in 1890 with the help local philanthropists and converted the building into a women's hospital. The hospital eventually expanded to inhabit structures from 128 to 140 Diamond Street. Kensington Hospital for Women was sixth women's hospital in the United States.

The hospital experienced financial difficulties as a result of The Great Depression and later lost a number of doctors and nurses when their services were needed elsewhere during World War II. The hospital closed in February 1945, but was purchased and reopened in 1946 as a general, nonprofit hospital by four doctors including Drs. Benjamin Ulanski and Leopold Vaccaro. The doctors began offering additional services and renamed the facility Kensington Hospital as it was no longer exclusively for women. Around this time, it is noted that the hospital began receiving financial support from a number of local Jewish philanthropists, some of whom sat on the hospital's board and owned nearby factories.

By the 1960s, the hospital could not compete with larger medical centers who had access to the most up-to-date technologies and nearly merged with other hospitals on a number of occasions. As the neighborhood's African American and Latino populations grew, the hospital employed a bi-lingual staff to better serve the community.

The hospital continued to struggle financially through the mid-1980s and was forced to pay a $400,000 fine when it was discovered that two hospital administrators had defrauded Medicare and Medicaid. It remained open and began specializing in treating those suffering from addiction.

== Present Day ==
The Kensington neighborhood was hard-hit by the opioid crisis and has been referred to as the "largest open-air narcotics market for heroin on the East Coast". Enforcement programs and gentrification in adjacent neighborhoods like Fishtown has caused some drug-related activity to move north. Kensington Hospital continues to serve the neighborhood and specializes in treating infections related to drug and alcohol abuse.

It remains the only independent hospital in Philadelphia.
