= Aime M. Awl =

American scientific illustrator (1887–1973)

- Born: Aime Rebecca Motter; January 15, 1887; Frederick, Maryland, U.S.
- Died: October 15, 1973 (aged 86); Braddock Heights, Maryland, U.S.
- Burial place: Mount Olivet Cemetery, Frederick, Maryland, U.S.
- Other name: Aime Rebecca Motter Awl
- Education: Johns Hopkins School of Medicine
- Occupations: Scientific illustrator, scientific delineator
- Employers: U.S. Department of Agriculture, United States National Museum
- Spouse: Francis Asbury Awl Jr.

Aime Rebecca Motter Awl (née Aime Rebecca Motter; 1887 – 1973), also known more commonly as Aime M. Awl, was an American scientific illustrator who worked for the U.S. Department of Agriculture, and the U.S. National Museum (now the National Museum of Natural History). Awl is internationally recognized for her scientific illustration, especially of fish species.

== Biography ==
Aime Rebecca Motter was born in Frederick, Maryland on January 15, 1887, to Effie Buhrman (née Market) and Judge John Columbus Motter. She graduated from the Girls' High School of Frederick. Awl married Major Francis Asbury Awl Jr., on May 22, 1922, in West Virginia and they had no children. Awl attended classes at the Department of Art as Applied to Medicine at the Johns Hopkins School of Medicine, where she was a student of Max Brödel.

Awl worked as a scientific delineator for the Smithsonian Institution and her work appeared in a wide range of scientific publications and the Encyclopædia Britannica. She drew fish species, such as Daniops Myersi.

Awl died on October 15, 1973, at the Vindobona Nursing Home in Braddock Heights, Maryland.
