= Thomas Stephen Cullen =

Canadian gynecologist (1868–1953)

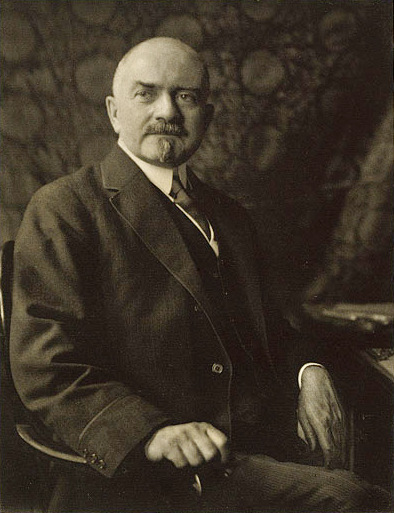
- Born: November 20, 1868; Bridgewater, Ontario, Canada
- Died: March 4, 1953 (aged 84); Baltimore, Maryland, U.S.
- Education: Toronto Collegiate Institute; Johns Hopkins University; University of Göttingen; University of Toronto (MB)

Thomas Stephen Cullen (November 20, 1868 – March 4, 1953) was a Canadian gynecologist associated with Johns Hopkins Hospital.

Born in Bridgewater, Ontario, Cullen was educated at the Toronto Collegiate Institute and the University of Toronto, graduating from the latter school with a Bachelor of Medicine degree in 1890. He began studying at Johns Hopkins University the next year, before traveling to Germany and studying at Johannes Orth's laboratory at the University of Göttingen in 1893. From 1893 to 1896, Cullen was in charge of gynecological pathology at Johns Hopkins, and in 1919 he was named a professor of clinical gynecology.

Cullen researched gynecological diseases including uterine cancer and ectopic pregnancy and promoted extensive use of diagrams in biomedical publishing. Cullen's sign, a discoloration of the skin about the navel which is regarded as a sign of a ruptured ectopic pregnancy, is named for him. He wrote alone, and in collaboration, four important monographs:

- Cancer of the Uterus (1900)
- Adenomyoma of the Uterus (1908)
- Myomata of the Uterus, with Howard Atwood Kelly (1909)
- Diseases of the Umbilicus (1916)

Cullen died at Baltimore, Maryland.
