= Howard Atwood Kelly =

American physician (1858–1943)

Howard A. Kelly
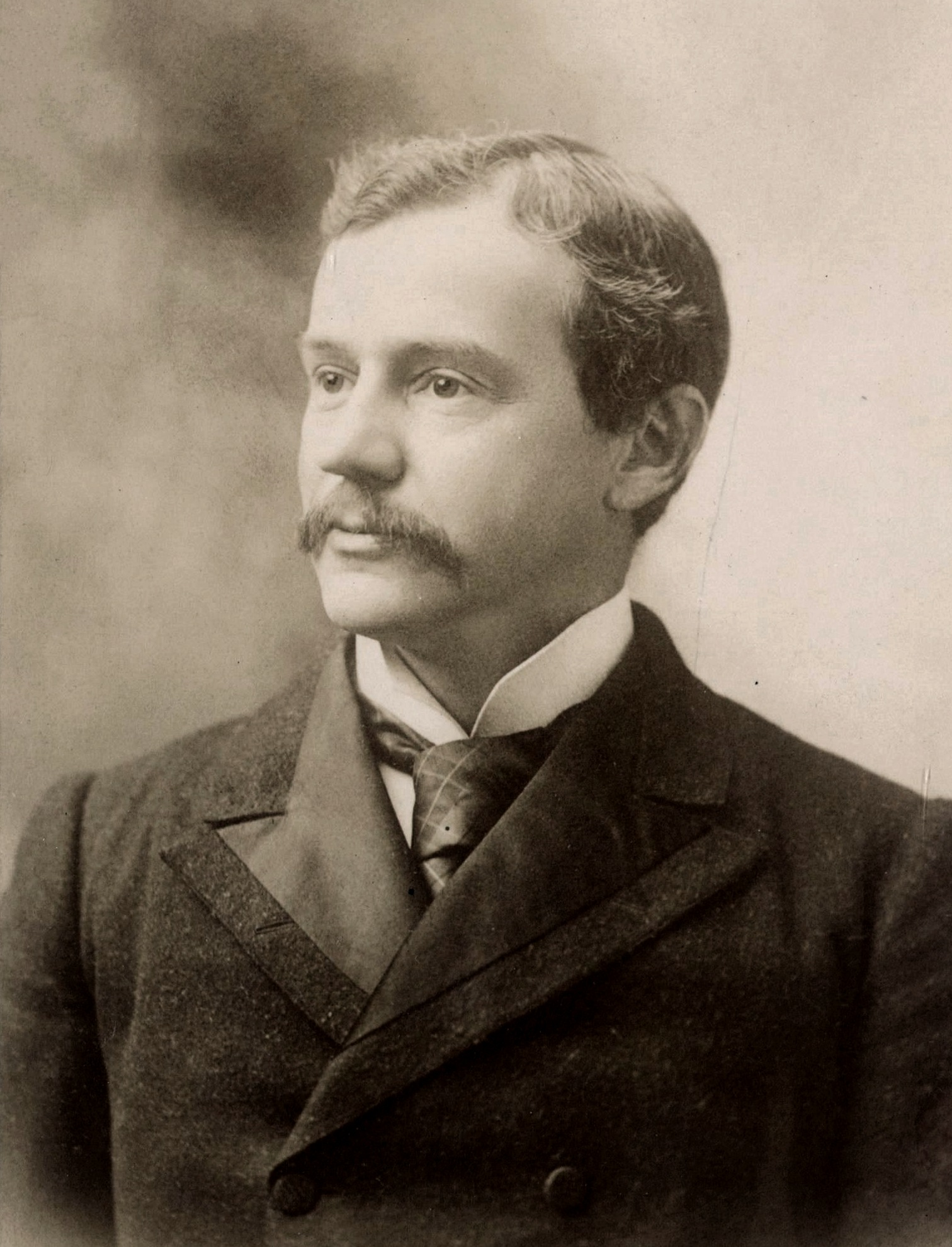
- Born: February 20, 1858; Camden, New Jersey, U.S.
- Died: January 12, 1943 (aged 84); Baltimore, Maryland, U.S.
- Education: University of Pennsylvania (BA, MD)
- Occupations: Obstetrician/Gynecologist; professor; writer
- Relatives: Dora Lewis (sister)

Howard Atwood Kelly (February 20, 1858 – January 12, 1943) was an American gynecologist. He, William Osler, William Halsted, and William Welch together are known as the "Big Four", the founding professors at the Johns Hopkins Hospital in Baltimore, Maryland. He is credited with establishing gynecology as a specialty by developing new surgical approaches to gynecological diseases and pathological research. He also developed several medical innovations, including the improved cystoscope, Kelly's clamp, Kelly's speculum, and Kelly's forceps. Because Kelly was a famous prohibitionist and Fundamentalist Christian, many of his contemporaries expressed skepticism towards his medical professionalism.

== Early life and education ==
Howard Kelly was born in Camden, New Jersey, in 1858; his parents were Henry Kuhl Kelly and Louisa Warner (Hard) Kelly. His family had a history in politics (Kelly's father's great grandfather, Michael Hillegas, was the first Treasurer of the United States), business, real estate and civil service. He was raised with strong religious influence from his parents, especially his mother. During the Civil War, Kelly and his mother lived in Chester while his father served in the war; Kelly spent his free time observing nature and studying the Bible with his mother. In the fall of 1867, Kelly entered the Faires Classical Institute. There, he developed an interest in languages, biology, natural science, and botany. In 1873 he started his undergraduate education at the University of Pennsylvania. During his college years, he was the president of the Franklin Scientific Society. At the age of 17, he became a member of the Philadelphia Academy of Natural Sciences. He received his B.A. degree in 1877.

== Medical career ==
=== Medical education ===
In 1877 he enrolled in the University of Pennsylvania Medical School where he became interested in anatomy, and in 1882, he graduated with the Anomaly Prize from the Demonstrator of Morbid Anatomy. He did his residency at the Episcopal Hospital at Kensington, Pennsylvania. Gynecology wasn't practiced at the hospital, so he opened his own clinic in a two-story house in a working district where he also lived. He saw patients during the day and slept on a sofa at night with a string tied to his toe so that whenever there was a tug on the string, he would be woken up to provide medical assistance. He also made house calls. Later, with money from a group of Philadelphia philanthropist women, he was able to open a formal clinic with an operating room in Norris Square, which later became the Kensington Hospital for Women, the sixth women's hospital in the United States. There, he created the "Kelly stitch", a procedure to treat Stress incontinence, and performed the first successful C-section in Philadelphia. He gained a reputation as an innovator in surgical techniques during this time.

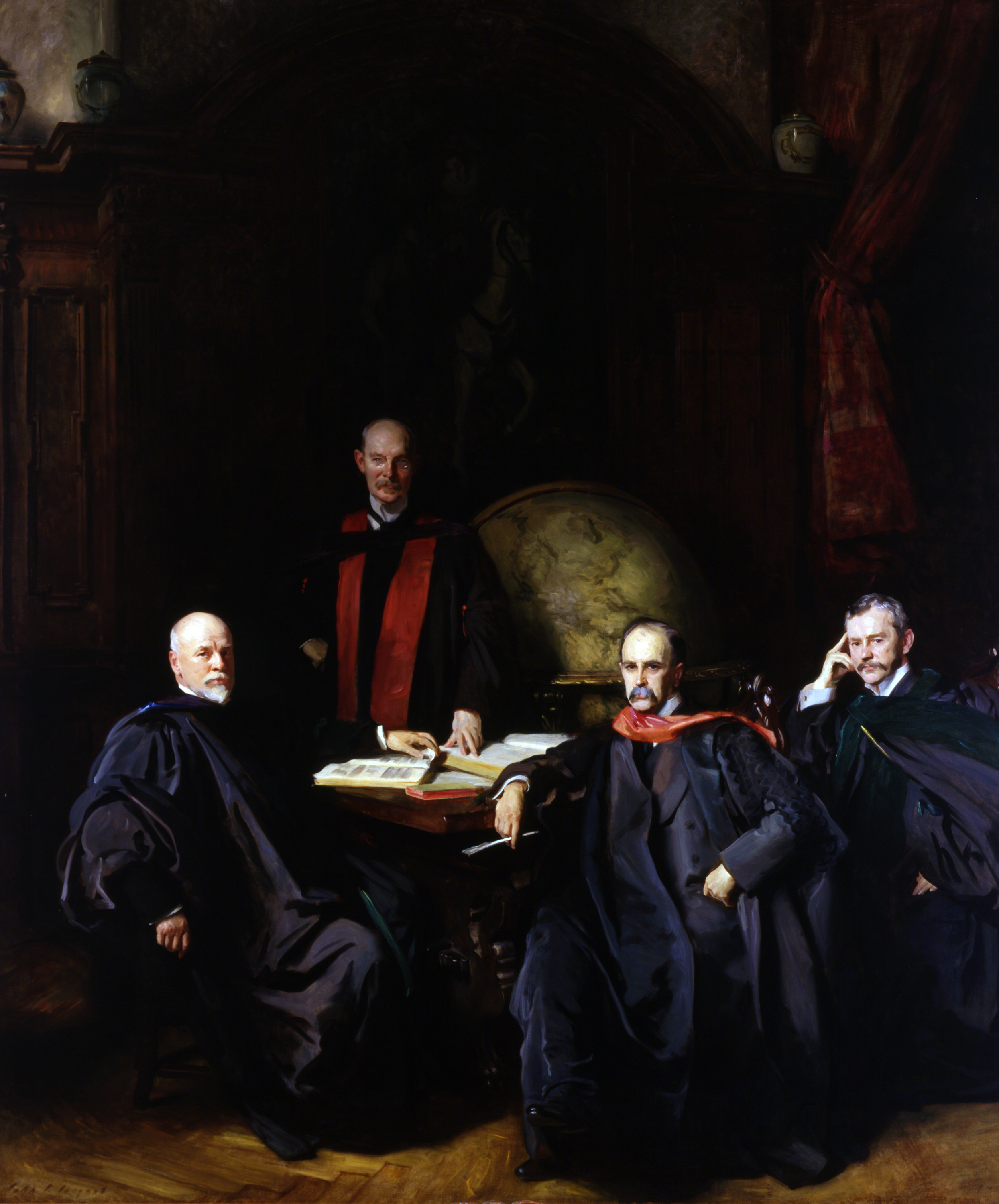
The Hopkins "Big Four" far right figure is Howard Kelly

From 1886 to 1888, Kelly traveled to England, Scotland, and Germany to observe abdominal and pelvic surgeons at work. When he was in Leipzig in 1886, he was introduced to the palpation of female ureters by Max Saenger. In Berlin in 1888, he worked with pathologist Rudolf Virchow to determine the best way to catheterize ureters. Then, in Prague in 1888, Czech medical doctor Karel Pawlik showed him how to catheterize ureters using a speculum and how to conduct an air cystoscopy. In 1888, he returned to the University of Pennsylvania, to become an associate professor of obstetrics under the recommendation of William Osler.

=== Medical career at Hopkins ===
In 1889, Osler recruited Kelly to become chair of gynecological surgery of the Johns Hopkins School of Medicine. Those two, along with two other founding faculty members, William Stewart Halsted and William H. Welch, became known at Hopkins as "The Big Four". After three years in Baltimore, Kelly founded the Howard A. Kelly Hospital, which was active until 1938. Kelly didn't require his patients to pay for surgical fees at Hopkins, but in his private practice, he charged a significant amount for his surgical and medical services.

=== Medical achievements ===
In the early 1890s, Kelly pursued the field of urogynecology and is known for establishing gynecology as its own field of study and through his textbook, Operative Gynecology, established a systematic approach to gynecological medicine and surgery.

Along with "Kelly's stitch", he developed other new surgical techniques and devices.

He identified what became known as "Kelly's sign", a way to find the ureter during surgeries. Because ureters tend to adhere to the peritoneum instead of maintaining its normal position along the psoas muscle during operations, it can be hard to find. Kelly's sign is a technique of applying gentle pressure to the ureters to cause peristalsis, or worm-like muscle contraction to identify the ureter.

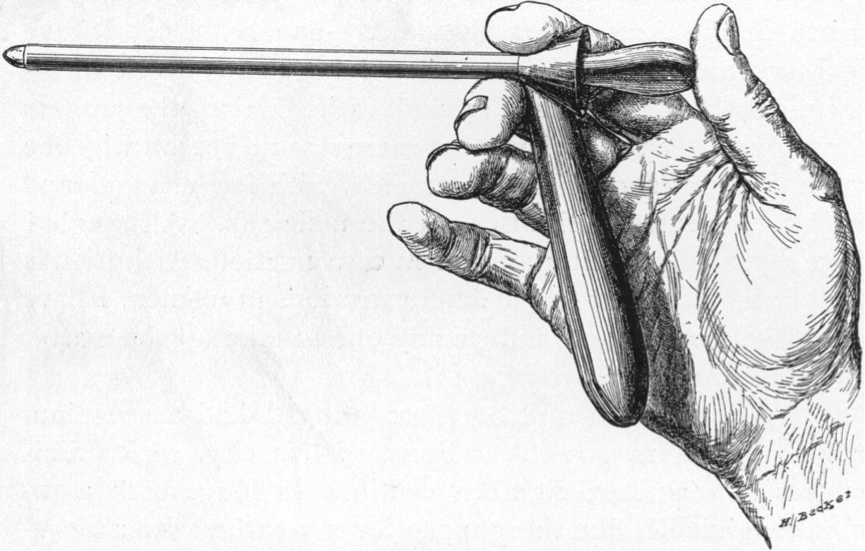
A reduced male cystoscope in holding positions.

Kelly developed better methods for examining the bladder, improving on methods he learned from Pawlik.

He invented the "Kelly speculum" for rectal examinations, as well as "Kelly's small cylindrical specular", a set of devices for vaginal examinations, some of which were specially designed for virgins.

He also invented "Kelly's forceps" or "Kelly's Clamp", curved hemostatic forceps that resemble a pair of scissors. Instead of sharp teeth or the blade of scissors, these forceps have blunt grips. They are used to clamp vessels to control blood flow and are arguably among the most common and best known surgical instruments. There are also subcategories like the tenaculum forceps and the alligator forceps.

To promote safety during surgery, Kelly used nitrous oxide for anesthesia, absorbable sutures during operations, and electrical lights for better lighting during surgery. He was also one of the first surgeons to use an operating suit, clothing made up of sterilized linens. Additionally, in order to minimize the possibility of wound infection, he invented a wound sealing procedure. First, he soaked two layers of sterilized gauze with celluloid and bichloride to secure the dressing to the skin. Then, he dusted the surface with iodoform and boric acid powder. Finally, until the stitches were removed, the wound was not exposed.

During the late 1890s, Kelly became interested in gynecological cancers. To reduce bleeding for cervical and endometrial cancers, he ligated the internal iliac artery, a technique that would come to be used in postpartum hemorrhages.

Newspaper Clipping from North Carolina detailing visit from Dr. Kelly to Zirconia, North Carolina, in search of radium.

Kelly also dabbled with the use of radium in 1904. He used radium to treat uterine hemorrhages and fibroid tumors and published these techniques in the Journal of the American Medical Association in 1914. Newspaper articles published in 1914, detail Kelly's personal visit to zircon mines and prospects in Zirconia, North Carolina. Kelly purportedly "expressed himself as highly pleased with the prospects for radium and took with him a number of specimens of zircon for assaying purposes". Additionally, in 1917, his own clinic had about 5.5 grams of radium and was one of the country's leading centers for radiation therapy for cancer treatment at the time.

=== Medical illustration ===
While Kelly was writing his book Operative Gynecology, he collaborated with the father of medical illustration, Max Broedel. Broedel observed Kelly during surgeries and also took stereographic photographs known as "Stereo Clinics," which were published in the textbook. Kelly remarked that one of his greatest contributions to medicine was bringing Broedel to Baltimore. Kelly encouraged Broedel to investigate the topic by himself and often extended deadlines for his illustrations to allow him time for independent research. Later on, he would also invite Hermann Becker and August Horm to join the illustration team.

=== Educator and author ===
Kelly influenced not only the surgical field but also the field of academia as well. Having felt constrained by his own residency, he encouraged his interns to try many things, and to go abroad and observe, and also subsidized some of his assistants to publish their work. He opposed teaching through lecturing and performing operations in a big amphitheater because he felt that students could see very little of the procedure and instead had small groups of students present while he saw patients and operated on patients.

By the time he reached the end of his career, Kelly had written over 550 articles and books that covered subjects such as appendectomy, the use of radium, electrosurgery, urogynecology, and ureteral catheterization. Additionally, he also had publications about medical history, religion, astronomy, geology, theology, herpetology, and botany.

== Personal life ==
=== Family ===
In 1889, Kelly married a German woman named Olga Elizabeth Laetitia Bredow in Danzig, Germany, daughter of Doctor Justus Bredow. They spent their honeymoon in Paris, France. In Baltimore, they raised nine children together in a five-story, eight-bedroom home with a 100,000-volume library. They also built a summer estate, Liriodendron, in Bel Air, Maryland.

Kelly raised his children in the Episcopal faith, as he was raised. One of his sons, Edmund Kelly, became a doctor.

=== Naturalist ===
Kelly's childhood interest in nature continued into his adult life. He kept several dozen cages filled with different types of reptiles in his house. He also learned how to handle rattlesnakes and harvest their venom. Later on in his career, Kelly received the title of Honorary Curator by The Division of Reptiles and Amphibians at the University of Michigan.

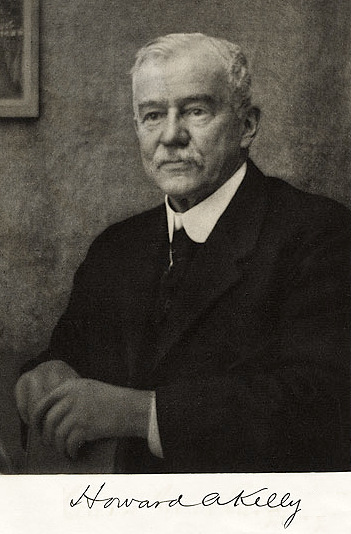

He also studied mycology, including mushroom identification, mycophagy, and research on mycologists. He collected a variety of different fungi and kept a list of species and observations. In 1924, with the help of Louis Krieger, he published a catalog of his mycological library, illustrations, and specimens, which had over 400,000 entries, an archive of artworks, 7000 titles on mushrooms, and replicas of fungi. In 1928, Kelly donated his collection to the Herbarium of the University of Michigan. This collection has been designated as The L. C. C. Krieger Mycological Library and Collections.

He also collected coins, mineral samples, Mexican pottery, oil lamps, and had several shrunken heads.

He also had a log cabin on the Ahmic Lake with its own library, microscopes, and field glasses; there was a seating area on roof and he had a telescope to observe the stars.

=== Religion ===
Kelly was devoted to the Episcopal faith. His religious life began with his mother teaching him about the Bible. As a teenager, Kelly would read the original Greek and Hebrew texts of the Bible and even passed out New Testament scripture to his fellow peers, exhibiting his early attempts at evangelism. As an adult, Kelly kept the Sabbath, read the Bible daily, and wrote books about religion such as A Scientific Man and the Bible.

At the hospital, Kelly also held prayer meetings before every operation, and at home, Kelly gave lengthy sermons to his family members after their Sunday dinners. Furthermore, Kelly prepared sermons for all denominations when ministers or pastors became unavailable on Sundays and supported missionaries. In accordance with his faith, Kelly was a prohibitionist, opposed the use of birth control devices, and endeavored to eliminate prostitution. He wanted to prevent people from being punished for sin and so even provided housing for former prostitutes who needed temporary lodging when they quit their practices and professed Christian beliefs.

One Baltimore columnist who was known for his attacks on anti-intellectualism, H.L. Mencken satirized Kelly's religious devotion: "Before cock-crow in the morning he has got out of bed, held a song and praise service, read two or three chapters in his Greek Old Testament, sung a couple of hymns, cut off six or eight legs, pulled out a pint of tonsils and eyeballs, relieved a dozen patients of their appendices, filled the gallstone keg in the corner, pronounced the benediction, washed up, filled his pockets with tracts, got into a high-speed automobile,...and started off at 50 miles an hour to raid a gambling house and close the red-light district in Emory Grove, Maryland."

=== Death ===
Kelly and his wife died about six hours apart at Union Memorial Hospital on January 12, 1943. Kelly was 84 years old. The joint funeral was held at the Memorial Episcopal Church and they were buried at Woodlawn Cemetery, both in Baltimore.

== Recognition and honors ==
Some of his awards:

- Honorary Degree of Doctor of Laws from the University of Pennsylvania in 1907
- Named an honorary fellow of universities in Edinburgh, Glasgow, Dublin, London, Paris, Rome, Berlin, Leipzig, Bucharest, Vienna, Kiev, and Lima
- Founding member of the American College of Surgeons in 1913
- Named Honorary Curator by the Division Reptiles and Amphibians at the University of Michigan Museum of Zoology
- Johns Hopkins Kelly Gynecologic Oncology Service named after him
- In 1943, a U.S. Liberty ship was christened the Howard A. Kelly.
- The Howard A. Kelly Alumni Society was established to honor Kelly by the physicians and alumni of the Johns Hopkins Gynecology and Obstetrics Department.
- Awarded Order of Leopold (Belgium), the Order of the Cross of Mercy, Serbia, and the Cross of Charity

Other recognition:

- In Bel Air, Maryland, a former portion of his summer estate is named Howard Park, and two nearby thoroughfares are named Atwood Street and Kelly Street.

== Bibliography ==
Some of his many publications:

=== Medical ===
- Operative Gynecology (two volumes, 1898)
- The Vermiform Appendix and its Diseases, with Elizabeth Hurdon, (1905, 1909)
- Walter Reed and Yellow Fever (1906, 1907)
- Medical Gynecology (1908)
- Gynecology and Abdominal Surgery, with Charles P. Noble (1908)
- Myomata of the Uterus, with T. S. Cullen (1909)
- Cyclopedia of American Medical Biography (1912)
- Diseases of the Kidneys, Ureters, and Bladder, with C. F. Burnam, (two volumes, 1914)
- American Medical Biographies with Walter L. Burrage (1920), 2nd edition of Cyclopedia of American Medical Biography
- Gynecology (1928)
- Dictionary of American Medical Biography: Lives of Eminent Physicians of the United States and Canada, from the Earliest Times (1928)

=== Naturalist ===
- American Medical Botanists (1913)
- Lafayette Houghton Bunnell, M.D., Discoverer of the Yosemite (1921)
- Snakes of Maryland (1936)

=== Social ===
- The Influence of Segregation upon Prostitution and upon the Public (1912)

== See also ==
- Works by or about Howard Atwood Kelly at Wikisource
- Howard A. Kelly Collection from Enoch Pratt Free Library at Digital Maryland
- Works by Howard Atwood Kelly at LibriVox (public domain audiobooks)
