= Association of Medical Illustrators =

Medical illustration organization

The Association of Medical Illustrators (AMI) is an international organization based in Illinois that offers certification in the field of medical illustration. A bachelor's degree with a major in art and a minor in the biological sciences, or a major in science with a minor in art, is generally preferred for those considering applying for membership. Membership in the Association also generally requires presentation of a portfolio of artwork and a personal interview.

Membership in the Association is not required in order for a person to claim to be a medical illustrator— the Association provides a set of standards for its members to meet and allows prospective employers to pre-screen candidates on this basis. One of the few preconditions on which an candidate can apply for membership is evidence of five years full-time employment as a medical illustrator, a position which itself may be difficult to achieve without having acquired membership in the Association.

The Association offers venues for its members to offer their services to potential employers, and for employers to search for illustrators. An application for renewal of certification is required every five years in order to maintain membership, and must be accompanied by payment of a fee.
