= Coquille board =

Drawing paper with a pebbled texture

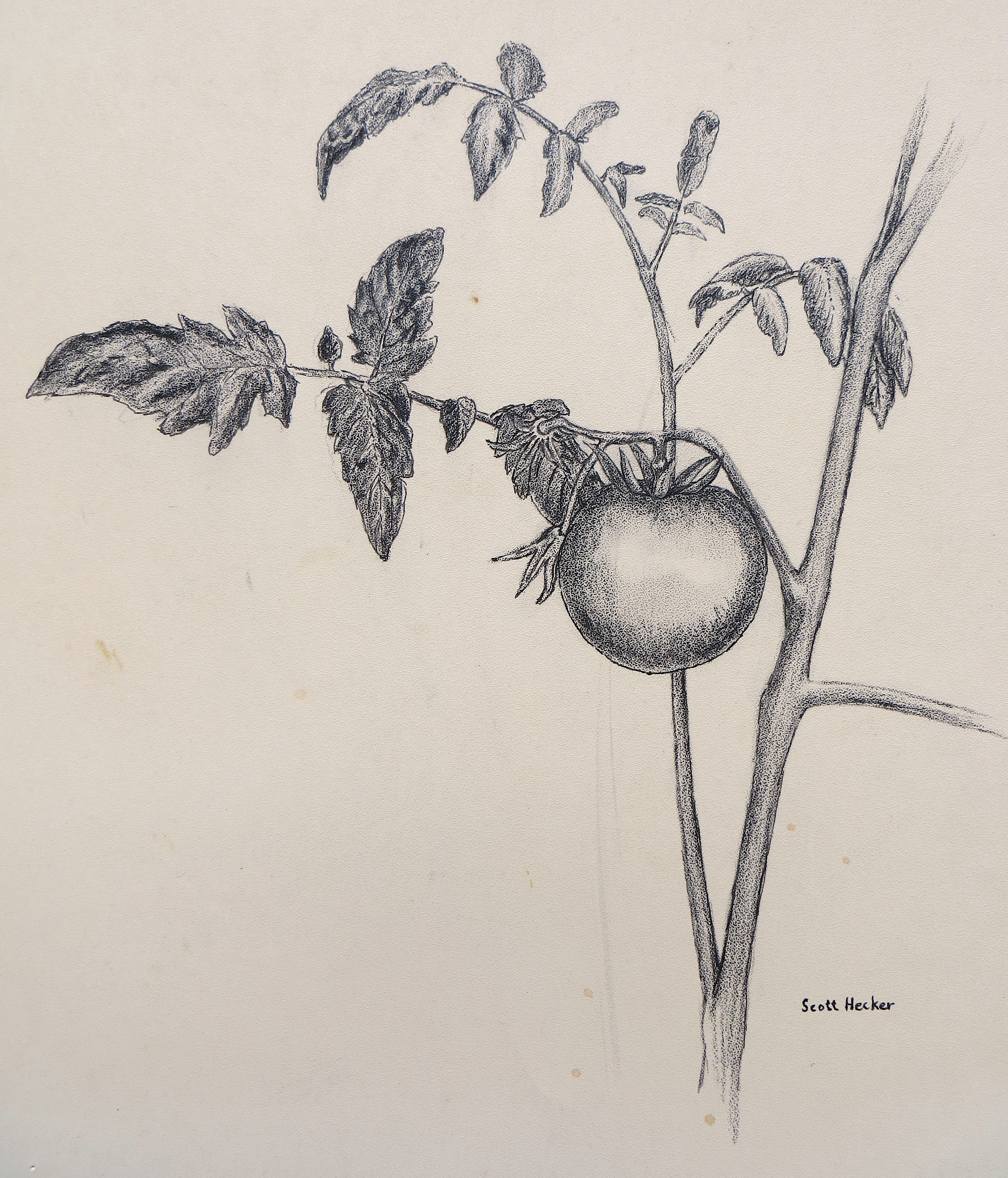
A garden tomato, drawn on coquille or stipple board.

Coquille board, also known as stipple board, is a type of drawing paper with a pebbled texture. The grain is impressed into the uncoated paper during manufacture. Used with a soft lithographic crayon or carbon pencil, coquille produces a shading effect similar to hand stippling in a fraction of the time. The material is especially useful for works to be reproduced in print, such as scientific illustration and cartooning. However, coquille is also delicate and cannot withstand vigorous pressure from an eraser.

It was used extensively during the pulp era to quickly create easily-reproducible print images. By the early 1990's it had been displaced by cheaper halftoning technologies and became difficult to obtain.
