= Christian views on birth control =

Prior to the 20th century, major branches of Christianity, such as Catholicism, Eastern Orthodoxy and Protestantism (including leading Protestant reformers Martin Luther and John Calvin)—generally held a critical perspective of birth control (also known as contraception). Among Christian denominations today, however, there is a large variety of views regarding birth control that range from the acceptance of birth control to only allowing natural family planning to teaching Quiverfull doctrine, which disallows contraception and holds that Christians should have large families.

== Background ==
Many early Church Fathers made statements condemning the use of contraception including John Chrysostom, Jerome, Clement of Alexandria, Hippolytus of Rome, Augustine of Hippo and various others. Among the condemnations is one by Jerome which refers to an apparent oral form of contraception: "Some go so far as to take potions, that they may insure barrenness, and thus murder human beings almost before their conception." Augustine of Hippo, in On Marriage and Concupiscence, states that whoever merely involving lust in intercourse without intending procreation, "although they be called husband and wife, are not; nor do they retain any reality of marriage, but use the respectable name [of marriage] to cover a shame. [...] Sometimes this lustful cruelty, or cruel lust, comes to this, that they even use sterilizing drugs." The phrase "sterilizing drugs" (sterilitatis venena) was widely used in theological and ecclesiastical literatures to condemn any contraceptive acts and birth control. Augustine utilized the biblical story of Onan as a supporting text to denounce contraception.

== Catholic Church ==
The Catechism of the Catholic Church specifies that all sex acts must be both unitive and procreative. In addition to condemning use of artificial birth control as intrinsically evil, non-procreative sex acts such as mutual masturbation and anal sex are ruled out as ways to avoid pregnancy. Casti connubii explains the secondary, unitive, purpose of intercourse. Because of this secondary purpose, married couples have a right to engage in intercourse even when pregnancy is not a possible result:

Nor are those considered as acting against nature who in the married state use their right in the proper manner although on account of natural reasons either of time or of certain defects, new life cannot be brought forth. For in matrimony as well as in the use of the matrimonial rights there are also secondary ends, such as mutual aid, the cultivating of mutual love, and the quieting of concupiscence which husband and wife are not forbidden to consider so long as they are subordinated to the primary end and so long as the intrinsic nature of the act is preserved.

John and Sheila Kippley from the Couple to Couple League say that the statement of Pope Pius XI not only permitted sex between married couples during pregnancy and menopause, but also during the infertile times of the menstrual cycle. Raymond J. Devettere says that the statement is a permit to undertake intercourse during the infertile times when there is "a good reason for it". The mathematical formula for the rhythm method had been formalized in 1930, and in 1932 a Catholic physician published a book titled The Rhythm of Sterility and Fertility in Women promoting the method to Catholics. The 1930s also saw the first U.S. Rhythm Clinic (founded by John Rock) to teach the method to Catholic couples. However, use of the rhythm method in certain circumstances was not formally accepted until 1951, in two speeches by Pope Pius XII.

This method has come to be known as "natural family planning." Some studies suggest that couples who practice NFP enjoy an abundance of healthy advantages, the most notable of which might be a reduced divorce rate amongst couples who use NFP. The Catholic Church continues to uphold the practice of natural family planning since it maintains the unitive aspect of the sexual union while still bolstering an openness to procreation.

=== Current view ===
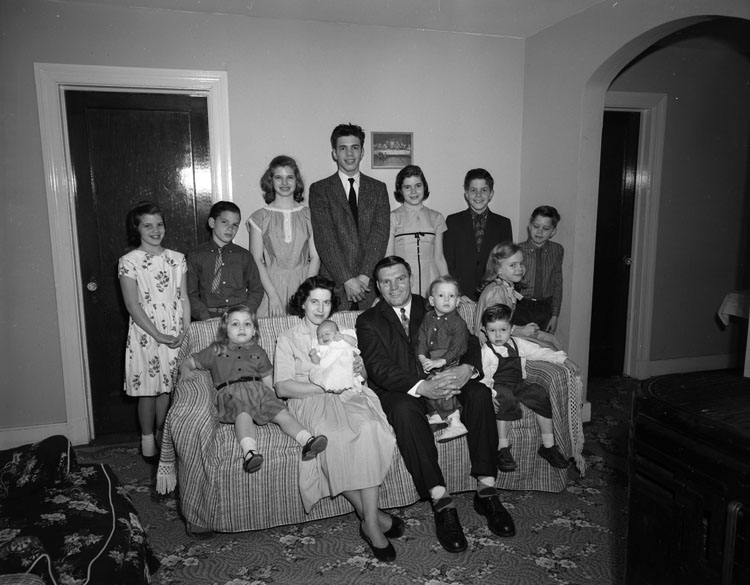
A Catholic family from Virginia, 1959

The Catholic position on contraception was formally explained and expressed by Pope Paul VI's Humanae vitae in 1968. Artificial contraception is considered intrinsically evil, but methods of natural family planning may be used, as they do not usurp the natural way of conception.

In justification of this position, Pope Paul VI said:

Responsible men can become more deeply convinced of the truth of the doctrine laid down by the Church on this issue if they reflect on the consequences of methods and plans for artificial birth control. Let them first consider how easily this course of action could open wide the way for marital infidelity and a general lowering of moral standards. Not much experience is needed to be fully aware of human weakness and to understand that human beings—and especially the young, who are so exposed to temptation—need incentives to keep the moral law, and it is an evil thing to make it easy for them to break that law. Another effect that gives cause for alarm is that a man who grows accustomed to the use of contraceptive methods may forget the reverence due to a woman, and, disregarding her physical and emotional equilibrium, reduce her to being a mere instrument for the satisfaction of his own desires, no longer considering her as his partner whom he should surround with care and affection.

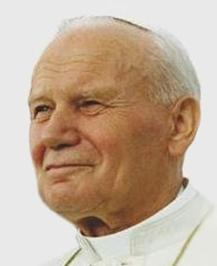
Pope John Paul II clarified Catholic teachings on contraception.

In issuing Humanae vitae, Pope Paul VI relied on the Minority Papal Commission Report of the Pontifical Commission on Birth Control. The minority report argued that:

One can find no period of history, no document of the church, no theological school, scarcely one Catholic theologian, who ever denied that contraception was always seriously evil. The teaching of the Church in this matter is absolutely constant. Until the present century this teaching was peacefully possessed by all other Christians, whether Orthodox or Anglican or Protestant. The Orthodox retain this as common teaching today.

On July 17, 1994, John Paul II clarified the church's position during a meditation said prior to an angelus recitation:

Unfortunately, Catholic thought is often misunderstood ... as if the Church supported an ideology of fertility at all costs, urging married couples to procreate indiscriminately and without thought for the future. But one need only study the pronouncements of the Magisterium to know that this is not so. Truly, in begetting life the spouses fulfill one of the highest dimensions of their calling: they are God's co-workers. Precisely for this reason they must have an extremely responsible attitude. In deciding whether or not to have a child, they must not be motivated by selfishness or carelessness, but by a prudent, conscious generosity that weighs the possibilities and circumstances, and especially gives priority to the welfare of the unborn child. Therefore, when there is a reason not to procreate, this choice is permissible and may even be necessary. However, there remains the duty of carrying it out with criteria and methods that respect the total truth of the marital act in its unitive and procreative dimension, as wisely regulated by nature itself in its biological rhythms. One can comply with them and use them to advantage, but they cannot be "violated" by artificial interference.

In 1997, the Vatican's Pontifical Council for the Family stated:

The Church has always taught the intrinsic evil of contraception, that is, of every marital act intentionally rendered unfruitful. This teaching is to be held as definitive and irreformable. Contraception is gravely opposed to marital chastity; it is contrary to the good of the transmission of life (the procreative aspect of matrimony), and to the reciprocal self-giving of the spouses (the unitive aspect of matrimony); it harms true love and denies the sovereign role of God in the transmission of human life.

A summary of the Scriptural support used by Catholics against contraception can be found in Rome Sweet Home, an autobiography by the Catholic apologists Scott and Kimberly Hahn, both of whom are converts to the Catholic Church from Protestantism. They illustrate the results of the research on contraception conducted by Kimberly Hahn as having a pivotal effect on their lives, notably the fact that the Catholic Church is one of the last few Christian groups to take a clear stance on the issue. Among the Scripture included in the book are the following lines from Psalm 127:3–5:

Sons are indeed a heritage from the Lord, the fruit of the womb a reward. Like arrows in the hand of a warrior are the sons of one's youth. Happy is the man who has his quiver full of them. He shall not be put to shame when he speaks with his enemies at the gate.

Catholic scholar Cormac Burke has written an anthropological (non-religious) evaluation of the effect of contraception on marital love, "Married Love and Contraception", arguing, "contraception does in fact denaturalize the conjugal act, to the extent that, far from uniting the spouses and expressing and confirming the love between them in a unique way, it tends to undermine their love by radically contradicting the full mutual self-giving that this most intimate act of the marital relationship should signify."

The 2008 Congregation for the Doctrine of the Faith's instruction Dignitas Personae reiterates church opposition to contraception, mentioning new methods of interception and contragestion, notably female condoms and morning-after pills, which are also "fall within the sin of abortion and are gravely immoral".

However, Father Tad Pacholczyk of the National Catholic Bioethics Center in Philadelphia, Pennsylvania stated in March 2016 that contraceptives are permissible if the sex is non-consensual, such as events of rape and sexual assault. This same position has been taken by the Bishops of New York State: that it is not sinful for a Catholic health care facility to "dispense emergency contraception medication as part of its compassionate treatment for a rape victim if, after appropriate testing, there is no evidence conception has occurred already" and that it is "advisable" for a rape survivor to immediately seek out pregnancy prevention.

=== Condom controversy ===
In 2003, the BBC's Panorama stated that Catholic bishops in Kenya have taught that HIV can pass through the membrane of the latex rubber from which condoms were made. It was considered untrue according to the World Health Organization.

In an interview on Dutch television in 2004, Belgian Cardinal Godfried Danneels argued that the use of condoms should be supported to prevent AIDS if sex with a person infected with HIV should take place, though it is to be avoided. According to Danneels, "the person must use a condom in order not to disobey the commandment condemning murder, in addition to breaking the commandment which forbids adultery. ... Protecting oneself against sickness or death is an act of prevention. Morally, it cannot be judged on the same level as when a condom is used to reduce the number of births." In 2009, Pope Benedict XVI asserted that handing out condoms is not the solution to combating AIDS and might make the problem worse. He proposed "spiritual and human awakening" and "friendship for those who suffer" as solutions. In 2010, Benedict in an interview which was published in the book Light of the World: The Pope, the Church and the Signs of the Times, when asked whether the Catholic Church were not opposed in principle to the use of condoms, stated:

She [the Catholic Church] of course does not regard it as a real or moral solution, but, in this or that case, there can be nonetheless, in the intention of reducing the risk of infection, a first step in a movement toward a different way, a more human way, of living sexuality.

Benedict cited the example of the use of condoms by male prostitutes as "a first step towards moralisation", even though condoms are "not really the way to deal with the evil of HIV infection". In a statement to explain his saying, the Congregation of the Doctrine of the Faith reaffirmed that the church considered prostitution "gravely immoral":

However, those involved in prostitution who are HIV positive and who seek to diminish the risk of contagion by the use of a condom may be taking the first step in respecting the life of another even if the evil of prostitution remains in all its gravity.

=== Dissent ===
Roderick Hindery reported that a number of Western Catholics have voiced significant disagreement with the church's stance on contraception. Among them, dissident theologian Charles Curran criticized the stance of Humanae vitae on artificial birth control. In 1968, the Canadian Conference of Catholic Bishops issued what many interpreted as a dissenting document, the Winnipeg Statement, in which the bishops recognized that a number of Canadian Catholics found it "either extremely difficult or even impossible to make their own all elements of this doctrine" (that of Humanae vitae). Additionally, in 1969, they reasserted the Catholic principle of primacy of conscience, a principle that they said should be properly interpreted. They insisted, "a Catholic Christian is not free to form his conscience without consideration of the teaching of the magisterium, in the particular instance exercised by the Holy Father in an encyclical letter".

Catholics for Choice stated in 1998 that 96% of U.S. Catholic women had used contraceptives at some point in their lives and that 72% of U.S. Catholics believed that one could be a good Catholic without obeying the church's teaching on birth control. According to a nationwide poll of 2,242 U.S. adults surveyed online in September 2005 by Harris Interactive (they stated that the magnitude of errors cannot be estimated due to sampling errors, non-response, etc.), 90% of U.S. Catholics supported the use of birth control/contraceptives. A survey conducted in 2015 by the Pew Research Center among 5,122 U.S. adults (including 1,016 self-identified Catholics) stated 76% of U.S. Catholics thought that the church should allow Catholics to use birth control.

== Eastern Orthodoxy ==
An official document of the Russian Orthodox Church prohibits contraception except when it is specifically approved by a confessor, does not involve the possibility of aborting a conceived child, is for reasons of inability to raise a child, and is done with spousal consent.

The Greek Orthodox Archdiocese of America have this information about contraception on their website: "Because of the lack of a full understanding of the implications of the biology of reproduction, earlier writers tended to identify abortion with contraception. However, of late a new view has taken hold among Orthodox writers and thinkers on this topic, which permits the use of certain contraceptive practices within marriage for the purpose of spacing children, enhancing the expression of marital love, and protecting health."

Eastern Orthodox believers, on all sides of the issue, tend to believe that contraceptive acceptance is not adequately examined, and that any examination has too often become tied up in identity politics, the more accepting group accusing the categorically opposed group of Roman Catholic influence.

Many Orthodox hierarchs and theologians from around the world lauded Humanae vitae when it was issued. Among these Orthodox leaders, some teach that marital intercourse should be for procreation only, while others do not go as far and hold a view similar to the Catholic position, which allows Natural Family Planning on principle while at the same time opposing artificial contraception.

Other Orthodox Church leaders maintain this interpretation is too narrowly focused on the procreative function of sex, not enough on its unitive function, and thus allow more freedom for contraceptive use among married couples.

Some Orthodox Christians, like Roman Catholics, consider using contraceptives not only a sin, but also a "mortal sin" in the manner of "unnatural carnal sins", along with homosexuality, bestiality, masturbation, etc.

== Oriental Orthodoxy ==
The Coptic Orthodox Church approves of contraception for health and socioeconomic reasons. It is against all abortion except when the mother's life is in danger.

The Ethiopian Orthodox Tewahedo Church is against all forms of hormonal contraception and the only birth control it advocates is abstinence on Orthodox feast days (up to 250 days a year) and when the women are fertile.

== Protestantism ==
As part of the Protestant Reformation, Reformers began to more strongly emphasize the unitive pleasures of marriage. Still, all major early Protestant Reformers, and indeed Protestants in general until the twentieth century, condemned birth control as a contravention of God's procreative purpose for marriage. As scientists advanced birth control methods during the late 19th and early 20th centuries, some Protestants continued to reject them, while other Nonconformists welcomed these advances.

=== Anabaptism ===
==== Mennonites ====
Certain Conservative Mennonites such as Beachy Amish Mennonite fellowships, maintain a prohibition against the use of birth control, though natural family planning is permitted. Old Colony Mennonites, like the Old Order Amish, do not officially allow birth control practices.

The Mennonite Church USA, the General Conference Mennonite Church, and the Rosedale Network of Churches—mainline Anabaptist denominations—have adopted statements indicating approval of modern methods of contraception. For example, while also teaching and encouraging love and acceptance of children, the Conservative Mennonite Conference maintains, "The prevention of pregnancy when feasible by birth control with pre-fertilization methods is acceptable." A study published in 1975 found that only 11% of Mennonites believed use of birth control was "always wrong".

==== Amish ====
Most Amish clearly seem to use some form birth control, a fact that generally is not discussed among the Amish, but indicated by the fact that the number of children systematically increases in correlation with the conservatism of a congregation, the more conservative, the more children. The large number of children is due to the fact that many children are appreciated by the community and not because there is no birth control. Some communities openly allow access to birth control to women whose health would be compromised by childbirth. Especially in recent years, more Amish couples have limited the number of children more than they did traditionally. This trend is more pronounced in communities where few of the men earn their living through farming.

==== Hutterites ====
The Hutterite Brethren use contraception only if it is recommended by a physician.

=== Anglicanism ===
The Anglican Communion, including the Church of England, condemned artificial contraception at the 1908 and 1920 Lambeth Conferences. Later, the Anglican Communion gave approval for birth control in some circumstances at the 1930 Lambeth Conference. At the 1958 Lambeth Conference it was stated that the responsibility for deciding upon the number and frequency of children was laid by God upon the consciences of parents "in such ways as are acceptable to husband and wife".

=== Baptists ===
The Southern Baptist Convention, the largest Baptist denomination in the world and largest Protestant denomination in the United States, initially welcomed the invention of birth control and legalization of abortion, but the rise of the Moral Majority 1980s and increased opposition to abortion led to a more nuanced view which generally approves of contraceptives but rejects abortifacients. In addition, prominent SBC leaders have spoken against a "contraceptive culture", affirming that nothing is inherently wrong with contraceptives, but encouraging couples to still have children and to view them as a blessing instead of an inconvenience.

=== Irvingism ===
The New Apostolic Church, the largest of the Irvingian Churches, teaches:

Family planning is at the discretion of both partners. Nevertheless, the Church opposes contraceptive methods and means that prevent the continued development of an already fertilised human egg cell. Artificial insemination is generally accepted, however, all measures by which life may be destroyed by human selection are rejected.

=== Lutheranism ===
The Evangelical Lutheran Church in America allows for contraception in the event the potential parents do not intend to care for a child. Laestadian Lutheran Churches do not permit the use of birth control. Neither the Lutheran Church–Missouri Synod nor the Wisconsin Evangelical Lutheran Synod has an official position on contraception.

=== Methodism ===
The United Methodist Church holds "each couple has the right and the duty prayerfully and responsibly to control conception according to their circumstances". Its Resolution on Responsible Parenthood states that in order to "support the sacred dimensions of personhood, all possible efforts should be made by parents and the community to ensure that each child enters the world with a healthy body, and is born into an environment conducive to realization of his or her potential". To this end, the United Methodist Church supports "adequate public funding and increased participation in family planning services by public and private agencies".

=== Reformed Churches ===
==== Continental Reformed Churches ====
In 1936, the Christian Reformed Church "adopted an official position against birth control...based on the biblical mandate to be fruitful and multiply, and in keeping with this reasoning the church discouraged birth control and encouraged married couples to produce as many children as is compatible with the physical, spiritual, and mental well being of the mother and children".

In 2003, the CRC synod declared that a married couple's decision whether or not to use birth control is a private, disputable matter. The church urges married couples to consider the size of their families prayerfully and encourages them to be motivated by a desire to glorify God and further his kingdom in their family planning.

==== Presbyterian Churches ====
The Presbyterian Church (USA) supports "full and equal access to contraceptive methods". In a recent resolution endorsing insurance coverage for contraceptives, the church affirmed, "contraceptive services are part of basic health care" and cautioned, "unintended pregnancies lead to higher rates of infant mortality, low birth weight, and maternal morbidity, and threaten the economic viability of families".

==== Congregationalist Churches ====
The Conservative Congregational Christian Conference, a denomination of the Congregationalist tradition, believes that some forms of contraception are abortifacients, a characterization that differs from established medical guidance and FDA standards. The denomination cites "the biblical position of the sacredness of life from conception until natural death" in explaining its opposition.

The United Church of Christ (UCC), a denomination of the Congregationalist tradition, promotes the distribution of condoms in churches and faith-based educational settings. Michael Shuenemeyer, a UCC minister, has stated, "The practice of safer sex is a matter of life and death. People of faith make condoms available because we have chosen life so that we and our children may live."

== Other denominations ==
=== The Church of Jesus Christ of Latter-day Saints ===
The Church of Jesus Christ of Latter-day Saints (LDS Church), the largest denomination of Mormonism, has over the course of its history changed its stance on birth control from condemning it as sinful to permitting it. The LDS Church's current stance is to leave birth control up to the discretion of individual couples: "Decisions about birth control and the consequences of those decisions rest solely with each married couple." The church teaches that sexual intimacy is not only for procreation: "Sexual relations within marriage are not only for the purpose of procreation but also a means of expressing love and strengthening emotional and spiritual ties between husband and wife." The church discourages surgical sterilization for birth control.

=== Jehovah's Witnesses ===
Jehovah's Witnesses allow married couples to use birth control:

Jesus did not command his followers to have or not to have children. Neither did any of Jesus’ disciples issue any such directive. Nowhere does the Bible explicitly condemn birth control. In this matter, the principle outlined at Romans 14:12 applies: "Each of us will render an account for himself to God." Married couples, therefore, are free to decide for themselves whether they will raise a family or not. They may also decide how many children they will have and when they will have them. If a husband and wife choose to use a nonabortive form of contraception to avoid pregnancy, that is their personal decision and responsibility. No one should judge them.

== See also ==
- Catholic theology of the body
- Christianity and abortion
- Religion and HIV/AIDS
