= Cervical mucus method =

Cervical mucus method may refer to a specific method of fertility awareness or natural family planning:

- Billings ovulation method
- Creighton Model FertilityCare System
- TwoDay Method
