= John C. Ford =

American Catholic theologian (1902–1989)

John Cuthbert Ford SJ (December 20, 1902 - January 14, 1989) was an American Catholic moral theologian. His work was widely relied upon by Catholics in the twentieth century for guidance on a wide range of moral questions. He was a professor of moral theology at Weston College in Massachusetts for much of his career, but also taught at Boston College, the Gregorian University in Rome and Catholic University of America. He cofounded the Jesuit academic journal Theological Studies, and together with Gerald Kelly, SJ, he created its regular feature "Notes on Moral Theology". He is best remembered for his role in the Pontifical Commission on Population, Family, and Birth Rate during the 1960s; he helped draft a minority report for this commission which stayed closer to traditional Catholic teaching than the majority report, and Pope Paul VI mostly relied on the minority report when he issued the encyclical Humanae vitae in 1968. Ford also is well known for condemning Allied "obliteration" bombing against Germany a year before the bombings of Hiroshima and Nagasaki, and for his support for Alcoholics Anonymous.

== Life and career ==
=== Biography ===
John Cuthbert Ford was born to Michael Joseph and Johanna Ford on December 20, 1902. He had two sisters, Margeret (Ford) Kieran and Anne Ford. He attended Boston College High School, and entered the Society of Jesus on August 14, 1920.

He completed the Jesuit juniorate at the Shadowbrook house in the Berkshires, was ordained a priest in 1932, and earned a series of degrees: at Weston College, a philosophy A.B. (1928) and a theology S.T.L. (1933); at the Gregorian University a doctorate in moral theology (1937); and a civil law degree from Boston College Law School (1941).

As a Jesuit, he would spend most of his career at Jesuit institutions, especially Weston College, which served as a Jesuit seminary. He become a professor of moral theology at Weston in 1937, and in 1939 he helped found the journal Theological Studies, which would reflect the work of Jesuit theologians in the U.S. He would teach at the Gregorian University in Rome during 1945–47, and at Catholic University of America during 1959–1966, returning to Weston College after both stints away. He retired after 1968, remaining professor emeritus at Weston until his death in 1989.

=== Obliteration bombing ===
During World War II, the general public in the U.S. knew that the Allies were conducting extensive strategic bombing against Germany. Because this bombing campaign was knowingly killing so many civilians, Ford wrote a condemnation of "obliteration bombing" as a strategy in war, which was published as an article in Theological Studies in 1944. Ford did not condemn the war itself, but argued that this kind of bombing was completely incompatible with just war theory because it violated non-combatant immunity; nor could it be justified by the principle of double-effect, because the military goals of the strategic bombing would only be achieved if civilians died. The article was later described by editors of Theological Studies as "perhaps the single most famous article" the journal ever published, especially since the same moral debate became more intense when nuclear bombs were dropped on Hiroshima and Nagasaki just a year after Ford's article was published.

=== Alcoholics Anonymous ===
Ford personally struggled with alcoholism early in his life, and his recovery, helped by Alcoholics Anonymous (AA), led to his attending the Yale Summer School of Alcohol Studies in 1948. He would become a regular lecturer for them, and would meet many of the leaders of the AA movement. He would help to promote AA in his writing and public speaking, and would particularly present AA's work to Catholic audiences as something compatible with Catholic tradition and teachings.

=== Contraception ===
In response to the development of oral contraception, in 1960 Pope John XXIII created the Pontifical Commission on Population, Family, and Birth Rate, often referred to as the Papal Birth Control Commission. The commission would meet regularly for most of the 1960s, and Ford was added to the commission by Pope Paul VI in 1965, (Note: Although it was John XXIII who started the commission, he died in 1963, so it was the next pope, Paul VI, who added John Ford to the commission, and who received the commission's final reports in 1966-67.) thus attending its fourth and fifth rounds of meetings (March 1965 and April–June 1966). In prior meetings, the commission's difficulty in reaching a clear consensus on the morality of the pill led other members (including theologians Bernard Häring and Josef Fuchs) to think that some change or development in Catholic thinking would be necessary. When Ford was added to the commission, he was known to be in favor of strictly adhering to the traditional approach, which would broadly declare use of oral contraception to be inherently wrong. His way of thinking came to be at odds with the majority of the commission. Patrick and Patricia Crowley, founders of the Christian Family Movement, made an influential presentation to the commission reflecting a large survey they had done of Catholic couples who, despite "great sincerity" of their religious convictions, expressed a "strong consensus in favor of change."

Ford was concerned that substantive changes to the teachings outlined in the 1930 encyclical Casti connubii would be a descent down a slippery slope on sexual morality. He also worried that allowing changes would undermine the public credibility of the pope and the bishops on moral issues. Before the 1966 meetings, Ford privately urged Paul VI not to make any reform of the teaching on contraception. Josef Fuchs led the drafting of a report that was supported by a majority of the commission, and Ford led the drafting of a minority report; Fuchs also wrote a "rebuttal report" in response to the minority report. All of these reports were submitted to Paul VI. When Paul VI issued the encyclical Humanae vitae in 1968, he affirmed that the Catholic Church viewed the use of contraception pills as immoral, and noted that he was not following the majority report of the commission. It is still considered a controversial encyclical.
