= Josef Fuchs (theologian) =

German Jesuit theologian (1912–2005)

The Reverend Josef Fuchs SJ
- Born: 5 July 1912; Bergisch Gladbach, Germany
- Died: 9 March 2005 (aged 92); Cologne, Germany

Ecclesiastical career
- Religion: Christianity (Roman Catholic)
- Church: Latin Church
- Ordained: 1937 (priest)

Academic background
- Education: University of Münster
- Influences: Odon Lottin; Karl Rahner; Bruno Schüller

Academic work
- Discipline: Theology
- Sub-discipline: Moral theology
- Institutions: Pontifical McGill University
- Doctoral students: Klaus Demmer; James F. Keenan; Dionigi Tettamanzi
- Influenced: Charles Curran; Richard A. McCormick

Josef Fuchs SJ (1912–2005) was a German Roman Catholic theologian and Jesuit priest of the 20th century.

== Life ==
Born 5 July 1912, Josef Fuchs was a German Jesuit priest, who taught at the Gregorian University in Rome for almost thirty years. In the 1950s, Fuchs's Natural Law and De Castitate were the standard texts for moral theology courses. Fuchs' theology focuses mostly on moral objectivity.

While serving on the Pontifical Commission on Population, Family, and Birth from 1963 to 1966, Fuchs experienced an intellectual conversion on two levels: his understanding on the issue of artificial means of birth control within marriage and his understanding of natural law, appropriating the theological anthropology of fellow Jesuit Karl Rahner. This set the stage for Fuchs' work to achieve in moral theology what Rahner had accomplished in systematic theology. Fuchs chaired a theological commission on contraception, the majority report of which was rejected by Pope Paul VI in the encyclical Humanae vitae.

Father James Keenan SJ, who studied under Fuchs, has claimed that Fuchs was one of those who provided the foundations for the moral theology of the Second Vatican Council. Deacon James Keating, conversely, sees Fuchs's views as conflicting with key points of Pope John Paul II's moral theology, and Keating stated in 2004 that he expected Fuchs's influence on future moral theologians to be minor.

Fuchs died in Cologne on 9 March 2005.

== Works (available in English) ==
- Christian Morality: The Word Becomes Flesh
- Moral Demands and Personal Obligations
- Personal Responsibility and Christian Morality
- « King Kong » Virginie Despente a`
