= Claude Dupuy (bishop) =

French Catholic priest, Archbishop of Albi

Claude Marie Joseph Dupuy
- Archbishop
- Archdiocese: Albi, Toulouse, France
- Installed: 4 December 1961
- Term ended: 15 June 1974
- Predecessor: Jean-Emmanuel Marquès
- Successor: Robert-Joseph Coffy

Personal details
- Born: 13 September 1901 Chevrières, Loire, France
- Died: 13 February 1989 (aged 87)
- Denomination: Catholic

Ordination history of Claude Dupuy
History
Priestly ordination
- Date: 20 March 1926
Episcopal consecration
- Principal consecrator: Cardinal Pierre-Marie Gerlier
- Co-consecrators: Bishop Etienne Bornet Bishop Alfred-Jean-Félix Ancel
- Date: 27 April 1955
Episcopal succession
Bishops consecrated by Claude Dupuy as principal consecrator
- Cardinal Bernard Panafieu: 1974

Claude Marie Joseph Dupuy (13 September 1901 – 13 February 1989) was a French Catholic priest who became Archbishop of Albi, which encompasses the department of Tarn in southern France. He held office at a time of social unrest and declining interest in the priesthood. In 1966 he was an episcopal member of the Pontifical Commission on Birth Control. After his retirement in 1974 due to health problems he returned his award of the Legion of Honour in protest against the law on abortion.

== Early years ==
Claude Marie Joseph Dupuy was born in Chevrières, Loire on 13 September 1901. His older brother died in 1916 during the Battle of the Somme when he was preparing to become a priest. This may have inspired Claude Dupuy to become a priest. He studied at the Séminaire universitaire de Lyon. He was ordained a priest on 20 March 1926. He received a doctorate in theology with a thesis on the "Triumph of the Cross", an apologetic work on Savonarola.

== Priest and Bishop ==
In 1928 Dupuy was appointed vicar of the working-class Izieux parish of Saint-Chamond, Loire, and iron and coal region. In 1946 Cardinal Pierre-Marie Gerlier called him to manage diocesan works. He was named diocesan chaplain of students, and was placed in charge of the press and the Semaine religieuse journal. From 1953 he was vicar-general of the archdiocese of Lyon and part of Rhône Nord. On 7 March 1955 he was appointed Auxiliary Bishop of Lyon and Titular Bishop of Selia. He was ordained Titular Bishop of Selia on 27 April 1955.

== Archbishop ==
On 4 December 1961 Dupuy was appointed Archbishop of Albi. As archbishop Dupuy instituted the Council of the Presbytery, the Diocesan Committee of Pastoral Care and many diocesan commissions. He placed great emphasis on collegiality, delegating authority and insisting that the work of the diocese be shared between the bishop and the priests. In the spirit of ecumenism he twinned the diocese with the Anglican Diocese of Chester in 1972. The diocese struggled during his time in office with a decline in priests, and in 1963 he had to drop Sunday services in the smaller rural parishes. He also consolidated urban and rural parishes. However, he built new places of worship in the growing suburbs of Albi, Castres and Graulhet. He was involved in social issues, including mining conflicts in 1962–63, returnees from Algeria, the threatened closure of the Saut-du-Tarn steel plant in 1968 and the other social disturbances of 1968.

Dupuy was an episcopal member of the Pontifical Commission on Birth Control. He was named to the fifth and final session of the Commission, which started in April 1966 and lasted almost three months until the end of June. This was the session where decisions were to be made. Dupuy was responsible for the "pastoral approaches" letter. This said "the church remains faithfully attached to the divine imperatives of the unity, stability and fecundity of marriage. It said that procreation was one of the ends of marriage, but that there were other ends including love between the married couple, education and upbringing of children and providing a basic unit for society. On the issue of contraception it said "what is always to be condemned is not the regulation of conception, but an egotistic married life, refusing a creative opening-out of the family circle ... this is the anti-conception that is against the Christian ideal of marriage. The pastoral introduction in French accompanied the draft Document concerning Responsible Parenthood (Schema Documenti de Responsabili Paternitate), the one part of the final report that was leaked. The commission could not reach agreement, and in the end Pope Paul VI set out the official church position in the encyclical Humanae vitae issued on 25 July 1968. The pastoral letter was published in The Tablet on 21 September 1968.

== Last years ==
Dupuy retired on 15 June 1974. He was suffering from heart problems, and in July 1974 moved to the retirement home for priests of the diocese in Vernaison. Towards the end of 1974 he returned the award of the Legion of Honour to President Valéry Giscard d'Estaing in protest against the new law on abortion. Claude Dupuy died on 13 February 1989.

== Sources ==
- Cheney, David M. (2015). "Archbishop Claude Marie Joseph Dupuy". Catholic Hierarchy.
- Kaiser, Robert Blair (29 October 1987). Encyclical That Never Was. A&C Black. ISBN 978-0-7220-3405-7.
- Klopsch, Louis; Talmage, Thomas De Witt; Sandison, George Henry (1975). Christian Herald. Christian Herald.
- McClory, Robert (1998). Rome et la contraception: histoire secrète de l'encyclique Humanae vitae (in French). Editions de l'Atelier. ISBN 978-2-7082-3342-3.
- Nelidoff, Philippe (1974). "Mgr Claude Dupuy". Archives diocésaines d'Albi 1D9 SR Albi 1962-1974 (in French). Archived from the original on 7 February 2015.
- Smith, Janet E (1 January 1991). Humanae Vitae, a Generation Later. CUA Press. ISBN 978-0-8132-0740-7.
