= Arcanum (encyclical) =

1880 encyclical by Pope Leo XIII

Arcanum Divinae Latin for 'mystery of the divine (Note: More fully, Latin: Arcanum divinae sapientia consilium, lit. 'The hidden design of the divine wisdom')' Encyclical of Pope Leo XIII
- Signature date: 10 February 1880
- Subject: On Christian marriage
- Number: 4 of 85 of the pontificate
- Text: In English

Arcanum (also known as Arcanum Divinae) is an encyclical issued on 10 February 1880 by Pope Leo XIII, on the topic of Christian marriage.

The encyclical was considered the forerunner to Pope Pius XI's 1930 Casti connubii and Pope Paul VI's 1968 Humanae vitae. Arcanum outlines the rule of marriage in the late 19th century, and goes through those actions which weaken the marriage sacrament, such as polygamy and divorce. The encyclical also posits the Church as a protector of marriage, rather than one interfering in the marital relationship.

== Summary ==
Pope Leo XIII began Arcanum by recalling the history of marriage, established in the Old Testament when God created man and woman:

We record what is to all known, and cannot be doubted by any, that God, on the sixth day of creation, having made man from the slime of the earth, and having breathed into his face the breath of life, gave him a companion, whom He miraculously took from the side of Adam when he was locked in sleep.

According to Leo, the institution of marriage was corrupted over the years by Gentiles and the Jewish nation. Polygamy and divorce both became accepted practice such as men being allowed to violate their vows by having sexual relations outside of marriage. Parents were also allowed to buy and sell marriageable girls.

=== Excellence of marriage ===
Leo stated in the Arcanum that all of these practices were condemned by Christ who raised marriage to the dignity of a sacrament.

By the command of Christ, it not only looks to the propagation of the human race, but to the bringing forth of children for the Church […]

The Church, always and everywhere, has so used her power with reference to the marriages of Christians that men have seen clearly how it belongs to her as of native right; not being made hers by any human grant, but given divinely to her by the will of her Founder.

That the judgment of the Council of Jerusalem reprobated licentious and free love, we all know; as also that the incestuous Corinthian was condemned by the authority of blessed Paul. Again, in the very beginning of the Christian Church were repulsed and defeated, with the like unremitting determination, the efforts of many who aimed at the destruction of Christian marriage, such as the Gnostics, Manichaeans, and Montanists; and in our own time Mormons, St. Simonians, phalansterians, and communists.

Not only […] was marriage instituted for the propagation of the human race, but also that the lives of husbands and wives might be made better and happier.

Almost since its inception, the Church had been at odds with the State about the sanctity of marriage. Leo believed that the civil institution of marriage could not replace the sacrament of marriage. The placing of marriage under the state as just another civil, contractual institution appeared to be a part of the on-going secular movement by the Freemasons and socialists of Leo's time.

[…] in Christian marriage the contract is inseparable from the sacrament, and that, for this reason, the contract cannot be true and legitimate without being a sacrament as well.

Treating marriage as just another contractual event opened the door for the reckless enablement of divorce. According to the modernists, what was needed was for Christianity "to introduce a more humane code sanctioning divorce".

=== Evils of divorce ===
The evils from divorce were many according to Leo in Arcanum:

- Matrimonial contracts are by it made variable; mutual kindness is weakened;
- Deplorable inducements to unfaithfulness are supplied;
- Harm is done to the education of children;
- Occasion is afforded for the breaking up of homes;
- The seeds of dissension are sown among families;
- The dignity of womanhood is lessened and brought low, and women run the risk of being deserted after having ministered to the pleasures of men.

The Romans of old are said to have shrunk with horror from the first example of divorce.

Due to marriage's relation to the circumstances of life, marriage was something "about which the State rightly makes strict inquiry and justly promulgates decrees". In spite of that state's interest in marriage, marriage had a spiritual element and Leo saw that many of his predecessors had to stand up to the princes and emperors of their times who tried to relax the bonds of marriage:

[…] the decrees of Nicholas I against Lothair; of Urban II and Paschal II against Philip I of France; of Celestine III and Innocent III against Alphonsus of Leon and Philip II of France; of Clement VII and Paul III against Henry VIII; and, lastly, of Pius VII, that holy and courageous pontiff, against Napoleon I, at the height of his prosperity and in the fullness of his power.

=== Mixed marriages ===
Though later popes would place conditions on mixed marriages, during the 19th century, those marriages – according to Leo – were considered part of the on-going rationalist attack on this sacrament:

Care also must be taken that they do not easily enter into marriage with those who are not Catholics; for, when minds do not agree as to the observances of religion, it is scarcely possible to hope for agreement in other things […] [T]hey give occasion to forbidden association and communion in religious matters; endanger the faith of the Catholic partner; are a hindrance to the proper education of the children; and often lead to a mixing up of truth and falsehood, and to the belief that all religions are equally good.

=== Summary of Arcanum from The Catholic Encyclopedia ===
From source here:

Arcanum taught that since family life is the germ of society, and marriage is the basis of family life, the healthy condition of civil no less than of religious society depends on the inviolability of the marriage contract.

The argument of the encyclical runs as follows: The mission of Christ was to restore man in the supernatural order. That should benefit man also in the natural order; first, the individual; and then, as a consequence, human society. Having laid down this principle, the encyclical deals with Christian marriage which sanctifies the family, i.e. the unit of society.

The divinely instituted marriage contract initially had two properties: unity and indissolubility. Through human weakness and willfulness it was corrupted in the course of time; polygamy destroyed its unity, and divorce its indissolubility. Christ restored the original idea of human marriage, and to sanctify more thoroughly this institution He raised the marriage contract to the dignity of a sacrament. Mutual rights and duties were secured to husband and wife; mutual rights and duties between parents and children were also asserted: to the former, authority to govern and the duty of training; to the latter, the right to parental care and the duty of reverence.

Christ instituted his church to continue his mission to men. The church has always asserted the unity and indissolubility of marriage, the rights and duties of husband, wife, and children. She has also maintained that, the natural contract in marriage having been raised to the dignity of a sacrament, these two are henceforth one and the same thing so that there cannot be a marriage contract amongst Christians which is not a sacrament.

Hence, while admitting the right of civil authority to regulate the civil concerns and consequences of marriage, the church has always claimed exclusive authority over the marriage contract and its essentials, since it is a sacrament. The encyclical shows by the light of history that for centuries the church exercised authority, and the civil power admitted that authority. But human weakness and willfulness began to throw off the bridle of Christian discipline in family life; civil rulers began to disown the authority of the church over the marriage tie; and rationalism sought to sustain them by establishing the principle that the marriage contract is not a sacrament at all, or at least that the natural contract and the sacrament are separable and distinct things. Hence arose the idea of the dissolubility of marriage and divorce, superseding the unity and indissolubility of the marriage bond.

The encyclical points to the consequences of that departure in the breaking up of family life, and its evil effects on society at large. It points out as a consequence, that the church, in asserting its authority over the marriage contract, has shown itself not the enemy but the best friend of the civil power and the guardian of civil society.

In conclusion, the encyclical commissions all bishops to oppose civil marriage, and it warns the faithful against the dangers of mixed marriages.

== See also ==
- List of encyclicals of Pope Leo XIII
- Christian views on marriage
