= Natural family planning =

Family planning methods approved by the Roman Catholic Church

Background
- Type: Behavioral
- First use: Ancient (calendar-based contraceptive methods, lactational amenorrhea method (LAM)); Mid-1930s (Basal body temperature (BBT)); 1950s (Billings ovulation method)

Failure rates ( First six months: LAM; Per year: symptoms- and calendar-based)
- Perfect use: LAM: 0.5%; Symptoms based: 1–3%; Calendar based: 5–9%; %
- Typical use: LAM: 2%; Symptoms based: 2–25%; Calendar based: 25%; %

Usage
- Reversibility: Yes
- User reminders: Dependent upon strict user adherence to method
- Clinic review: None

Advantages and disadvantages
- STI protection: No
- Period advantages: Prediction
- Benefits: Personal self-awareness, no side effects, can aid pregnancy achievement, in accord with Catholic teachings, no blocks that affect intercourse

Natural family planning (NFP) comprises the family planning methods approved by the Catholic Church and some Protestant denominations for both achieving and postponing or avoiding pregnancy. In accordance with the church's teachings regarding sexual behavior, NFP excludes the use of other methods of birth control, which it refers to as "artificial contraception".

Periodic abstinence, the crux of NFP, is deemed moral by the Church for avoiding or postponing pregnancy for just reasons. When used to avoid pregnancy, couples may engage in sexual intercourse during a woman's naturally occurring infertile times such as during portions of her ovulatory cycle. Various methods may be used to identify whether a woman is likely to be fertile; this information may be used in attempts to either avoid or achieve pregnancy.

Effectiveness can vary widely, depending on the method used, whether the users were trained properly, and how carefully the couple followed the protocol. Pregnancy can result in up to 25% of the user population per year for users of the symptoms-based or calendar-based methods, depending on the method used and how carefully it was practised.

Natural family planning has shown very weak and contradictory results in pre-selecting the sex of a child.

== History ==
=== Pre-20th century ===
In ancient history, some Christian writers were against abstinence to prevent childbirth and some allowed it. Possibly the earliest Christian writing about periodic abstinence was by Clement of Alexandria. He wrote, "Let the Educator (Christ) put us to shame with the word of Ezekiel: 'Put away your fornications' [Ezekiel 43:9]. Why, even unreasoning beasts know enough not to mate at certain times. To indulge in intercourse without intending children is to outrage nature, whom we should take as our instructor."

In the year 388, Augustine of Hippo wrote against the Manichaeans: "Is it not you who used to counsel us to observe as much as possible the time when a woman, after her purification, is most likely to conceive, and to abstain from cohabitation at that time...?" The Manichaeans believed that it was immoral to create any children, thus (by their belief system), trapping souls in mortal bodies. Augustine condemned them for their use of periodic abstinence during fertile periods: "From this it follows that you consider marriage is not to procreate children, but to satiate lust." About the year 401, Augustine wrote "Of the Good of Marriage" in which he affirmed married couples have the option of having sex without either of them intending procreation: "For, whereas that natural use, when it pass beyond the compact of marriage, that is, beyond the necessity of begetting, is pardonable in the case of a wife, damnable in the case of an harlot; that which is against nature is execrable when done in the case of an harlot, but more execrable in the case of a wife."

Thomas Aquinas wrote in Summa Contra Gentiles: "Hence it is clear that every emission of the semen is contrary to the good of man, which takes place in a way whereby generation is impossible; and if this is done on purpose, it must be a sin. I mean a way in which generation is impossible in itself as is the case in every emission of the semen without the natural union of male and female: wherefore such sins are called 'sins against nature.' But if it is by accident that generation cannot follow from the emission of the semen, the act is not against nature on that account, nor is it sinful; the case of the woman being barren would be a case in point."

Protestant Reformers such as Martin Luther and John Calvin were opposed to unnatural birth control. Centuries later, John Wesley, the leader of the Methodist movement said that unnatural birth control could destroy one's soul.

If the Manichaeans had an accurate idea of the fertile portion of the menstrual cycle, such knowledge died with them. Documented attempts to prevent pregnancy by practicing periodic abstinence do not appear again until the mid-19th century, when various calendar-based methods were developed "by a few secular thinkers". The Roman Catholic Church's first recorded official approval of periodic abstinence from 1853, where a ruling of the church's Sacred Penitentiary addressed the topic. Distributed to confessors, the ruling stated that couples who had, on their own, begun the practice of periodic abstinence—if they had "grave reasons"—were not sinning by doing so.

In the Catholic Church, a grave/significant reason for using NFP can include social, economical, medical and other analogous reasons that may motivate a couple to practise it to postpone pregnancy. The church holds that the motivations behind NFP should not be selfish or self-centered.

In 1880, the Sacred Penitentiary reaffirmed the 1853 ruling and went slightly further. It suggested that, in cases where the couple was already practising artificial birth control and could not be dissuaded to cease attempting birth regulation, the confessor might morally teach them of periodic abstinence.

=== Early 20th century ===
In 1905, Theodoor Hendrik van de Velde, a Dutch gynecologist, showed that women only ovulate once per menstrual cycle. In the 1920s Japanese gynecologist Kyusaku Ogino and Austrian Hermann Knaus independently made the discovery that ovulation occurs about fourteen days before the next menstrual period. Ogino used his discovery to develop a formula for use in aiding infertile women to time intercourse to achieve pregnancy.

In 1930, John Smulders, a Roman Catholic physician from the Netherlands, used Knaus and Ogino's discoveries to create the rhythm method. Smulders published his work with the Dutch Roman Catholic medical association, and this was the official rhythm method promoted over the next several decades. While maintaining procreation as the primary function of intercourse, the December 1930 encyclical Casti connubii by Pope Pius XI gave recognition to a secondary—unitive—purpose of sexual intercourse. This encyclical stated that, as long as the couple does not deliberately choose the infertile periods to avoid offspring, there was no moral stain associated with having marital intercourse at times when "new life cannot be brought forth". This referred primarily to conditions such as current pregnancy and menopause. In 1932, a Catholic physician published a book titled The Rhythm of Sterility and Fertility in Women describing the method, and the 1930s also saw the first U.S. Rhythm Clinic (founded by John Rock) to teach the method to Catholic couples. It was during this decade that Rev. Wilhelm Hillebrand, a Catholic priest in Germany, developed a system for avoiding pregnancy based on basal body temperature.

=== 20th century to present day ===
A minority of Catholic theologians continued to doubt the morality of periodic abstinence. Some historians consider two speeches delivered by Pope Pius XII in 1951 to be the first unequivocal acceptance of periodic abstinence by the Catholic Church. The 1950s also saw another major advance in fertility awareness knowledge: Dr. John Billings discovered the relationship between cervical mucus and fertility while working for the Melbourne Catholic Family Welfare Bureau. Billings and several other physicians studied this sign for a number of years, and by the late 1960s had performed clinical trials and begun to set up teaching centers around the world.

The Vatican II Constitution on the Church in the Modern World document declared: "While not making the other purposes of matrimony of less account, the true practice of conjugal love, and the whole meaning of the family life which results from it, have this aim: that the couple be ready with stout hearts to cooperate with the love of the Creator and the Savior. Who through them will enlarge and enrich His own family day by day" (50). Beyond that the council of bishops was told to leave to the Pontifical Commission on Birth Control the task of advising Pope Paul VI on the issue. 64 of the 68 Commission members who voted recommended allowing other means of contraception, but Paul VI determined otherwise.

Humanae Vitae, published in 1968 by Pope Paul VI, addressed a pastoral directive to scientists: "It is supremely desirable [...] that medical science should by the study of natural rhythms succeed in determining a sufficiently secure basis for the chaste limitation of offspring." This is interpreted as favoring the then-new, more reliable symptoms-based fertility awareness methods over the rhythm method. Just a few years later, in 1971, the first organization to teach a symptothermal method, using both mucus and temperature observations, was started. Now called Couple to Couple League International, this organization was founded by John and Sheila Kippley, lay Catholics, along with Dr. Konald Prem. During the following decade, other now-large Catholic organizations were formed: Family of the Americas (1977), and the Creighton Model as part of the Pope Paul VI Institute (1985), both mucus-based systems of NFP.

Use of the term natural family planning to describe calendar-based methods is considered incorrect by the United States Conference of Catholic Bishops, which considers such methods "inaccurate". Some organizations have considered calendar-based methods to be forms of NFP. For example, in 1999 the Institute for Reproductive Health at Georgetown University developed the Standard Days Method (SDM), which is more effective than the rhythm method. SDM is promoted by Georgetown University as a form of natural family planning.

== Prevalence ==
It is estimated that 2–3% of the world's reproductive age population relies on periodic abstinence to avoid pregnancy. However, what portion of this population should be considered NFP users is unclear. Some Catholic sources consider couples that violate the religious restrictions associated with natural family planning to not be NFP users.

There is little data on the worldwide use of natural family planning. In Brazil, NFP is the third most popular family planning method. The "safe period" method of fertility awareness is the most common family planning method used in India, although condoms are used by some. Of all American women surveyed nationally in 2002, only 0.9% were using "periodic abstinence" (defined as "calendar rhythm" and "natural family planning") compared to 60.6% using other contraceptive methods. In Italy, where the vast majority of citizens claims to be Catholic, NFP methods are rarely taught.

In 2002, Sam and Bethany Torode, then a Protestant Christian couple, published a book advocating NFP use. Many NFP clinics and teaching organizations are associated with the Catholic Church, as well as the Church of Jesus Christ of Latter-day Saints (LDS Church) and some members of the Muslim faith.

Some fundamental Christians espouse Quiverfull theology, eschewing all forms of birth control, including natural family planning.

== Contraception ==
Some proponents of NFP differentiate it from other forms of birth control by labeling them artificial birth control. Other NFP literature holds that natural family planning is distinct from contraception. Proponents justify this classification system by saying that NFP has unique characteristics not shared by any other method of birth regulation except for abstinence. NFP is open to life, it alters neither the fertility of the woman nor the fecundity of a particular sex act; NFP can be used to both avoid or achieve pregnancy.

The Catholic Church has often said that it considers the use of contraception not to conform with God's will for Catholic marriage, in that it interrupts the procreative aspect of the sexual union, making it unnatural and counter to what God has outlined for married couples. Pope John Paul II said in Love and Responsibility that an integral aspect of the love between husband and wife is the openness to the real potential of becoming a parent, or becoming a parent of another, whenever the spouses give of themselves in the sexual embrace. Edward Sri makes an additional commentary on Love and Responsibility in Men, Women, and the Mystery of Love, claiming the openness to life within marriage bolsters an emotional intimacy to supplement physical intimacy.

Claims about how contraception can negatively impact fidelity within marriage are supported by a 2021 study of more than 2,000 married women, some of whom practised NFP within their marriage and some of whom practised contraception. The study found that women who practised NFP were 58% less likely than their peers who used contraception to get divorced. "Although there are lower odds of divorce among NFP users, the reason might be due to their religiosity."

== Methods ==
There are three main types of NFP: the symptoms-based methods, the calendar-based methods, and the breastfeeding or lactational amenorrhea method. Symptoms-based methods rely on biological signs of fertility, while calendar-based methods estimate the likelihood of fertility based on the length of past menstrual cycles.

Clinical studies by the Guttmacher Institute found that periodic abstinence resulted in a 25.3 percent failure under typical conditions, though it did not differentiate between symptom-based and calendar-based methods.

=== Symptoms-based ===
Some methods of NFP track biological signs of fertility. When used outside of the Catholic concept of NFP, these methods are often referred to simply as fertility awareness-based methods rather than NFP. The three primary signs of a woman's fertility are her basal body temperature (BBT), her cervical mucus, and her cervical position. Computerized fertility monitors, such as Lady-Comp, may track basal body temperatures, hormonal levels in urine, changes in electrical resistance of a woman's saliva, or a mixture of these symptoms.

From these symptoms, a woman can learn to assess her fertility without use of a computerized device. Some systems use only cervical mucus to determine fertility. Two well-known mucus-only methods are the Billings ovulation method and the Creighton Model FertilityCare System. If two or more signs are tracked, the method is referred to as a symptothermal method. Two popular symptothermal systems are taught by the Couple to Couple League and the Fertility Awareness Method (FAM) with Toni Weschler. A study completed in Germany in 2007 found that the symptothermal method has a method effectiveness of 99.6%.

A study by the World Health Organization involving 869 fertile women from Australia, India, Ireland, the Philippines, and El Salvador found that 93% could accurately interpret their body's signals regardless of education and culture.

A symptohormonal method of NFP developed at Marquette University uses the ClearBlue Easy fertility monitor and cycle history to determine the fertile window. The monitor measures estrogen and LH to determine the peak day. This method is also applicable during postpartum, breastfeeding, and perimenopause, and requires less abstinence than other NFP methods. Some couples prefer this method because the monitor reading is objective and is not affected by sleep quality as BBT can be.

=== Calendar-based ===
Calendar-based methods determine fertility based on a record of the length of previous menstrual cycles. They include the Rhythm Method and the Standard Days Method. The Standard Days method was developed and proven by the researchers at the Institute for Reproductive Health of Georgetown University. CycleBeads, unaffiliated with religious teachings, is a visual tool based on the Standard Days method. According to the Institute of Reproductive Health, when used as birth control, CB has a 95% effectiveness rating. Computer programs are available to help track fertility on a calendar.

=== Lactational amenorrhea ===
The lactational amenorrhea method (LAM) is a method of avoiding pregnancy based on the natural postpartum infertility that occurs when a woman is amenorrheic and fully breastfeeding. The rules of the method help a woman identify and possibly lengthen her infertile period.

== Debates ==
Roderick Hindery reported that a number of Western Catholics have voiced significant disagreement with the Church's stance on contraception. In 1968, the Canadian Conference of Catholic Bishops issued what many interpreted as a dissenting document, the Winnipeg Statement, in which the bishops recognized that a number of Canadian Catholics found it "either extremely difficult or even impossible to make their own all elements of this doctrine" (that of Humanae vitae). Additionally, in 1969, they reasserted the Catholic principle of primacy of conscience, a principle that they said should be properly interpreted. They insisted that "a Catholic Christian is not free to form his conscience without consideration of the teaching of the magisterium, in the particular instance exercised by the Holy Father in an encyclical letter." Catholics for a Free Choice claimed in 1998 that 96% of U.S. Catholic women had used contraceptives at some point in their lives and that 72% of U.S. Catholics believed that one could be a good Catholic without obeying the church's teaching on birth control. According to a nationwide poll of 2,242 U.S. adults surveyed online in September 2005 by Harris Interactive (they stated that the magnitude of errors cannot be estimated due to sampling errors, non-response, etc.), 90% of U.S. Catholics supported the use of birth control/contraceptives. A survey conducted in 2015 by the Pew Research Center among 5,122 U.S. adults (including 1,016 self-identified Catholics) stated 76% of U.S. Catholics thought that the Church should allow Catholics to use birth control.

In 2003, the BBC's Panorama claimed that church officials had taught that HIV could pass through the latex rubber membrane of a condom. It was considered not true according to the World Health Organization, despite a 2000 report by the National Institutes of Health (NIH) stating that consistent use of latex condoms reduced the risk of HIV transmission by approximately 85% relative to risk when unprotected, which is not 100% safe.

In an interview on Dutch television in 2004, Belgian Cardinal Godfried Danneels argued that the use of condoms should be supported to prevent AIDS if sex with a person infected with HIV should take place, though it is to be avoided. According to Danneels, "the person must use a condom in order not to disobey the commandment condemning murder, in addition to breaking the commandment which forbids adultery. [...] Protecting oneself against sickness or death is an act of prevention. Morally, it cannot be judged on the same level as when a condom is used to reduce the number of births." In 2009, Pope Benedict XVI asserted that handing out condoms was not the solution to combating AIDS and actually made the problem worse. He proposed "spiritual and human awakening" and "friendship for those who suffer" as solutions.

Artificial family planning proponent Stephen D. Mumford claimed that the primary motivation behind the church's continued opposition to contraceptive use is the impossibility to make changes without spoiling papal authority with regards to papal infallibility. Mumford gives as an example the citation made by dissident theologian August Bernhard Hasler of a minority report co-authored by Pope John Paul II prior to his papacy:

If it should be declared that contraception is not evil in itself, then we should have to concede frankly that the Holy Spirit had been on the side of the Protestant churches in 1930 (when the encyclical Casti connubii was promulgated), in 1951 (Pius XII's address to the midwives), and in 1958 (the address delivered before the Society of Hematologists in the year the pope died). It should likewise have to be admitted that for a half century the Spirit failed to protect Pius XI, Pius XII, and a large part of the Catholic hierarchy from a very serious error. This would mean that the leaders of the Church, acting with extreme imprudence, had condemned thousands of innocent human acts, forbidding, under pain of eternal damnation, a practice which would now be sanctioned. The fact can neither be denied nor ignored that these same acts would now be declared licit on the grounds of principles cited by the Protestants, which popes and bishops have either condemned or at least not approved.

It is said that none of the instances cited falls under the domain of papal infallibility; the pope is not considered infallible except in the rare, solemn occasions when he is speaking ex cathedra. According to M. R. Gagnebet, though the encyclical Humanae vitae is considered by some to be a non-infallible document, "the doctrinal authority of the Pope and the Bishops is not limited to infallible teaching. The duty of obedience is not restricted to definitions of faith".

Theological opposition has come from some denominations of Protestant Christianity. The Reformed theologian John Piper's Desiring God ministry states of NFP, "There is no reason to conclude that natural family planning is appropriate but that 'artificial' (non-abortive) means are not." Eastern Orthodox couple Sam and Bethany Torode, former advocates of NFP-only, have redacted their position to include barrier methods and explain their current theology this way:

We also see honest congruity with the language of the body by saying "no" to conception with our bodies (via barrier methods or sensual massage) when our minds and hearts are also saying "no" to conception. We don't believe this angers God, nor that it leads to the slippery slope of relativism or divorce. We strongly disagree with the idea that this is a mortal sin [...] It's a theological attack on women to always require that abstinence during the time of the wife's peak sexual desire (ovulation) for the entire duration of her fertile life, except for the handful of times when she conceives.

Traditionalist Catholic priest Francis Ripley criticizes the concept:

The use of the term "Natural Family Planning" has come under sharp attack from traditional Catholic writers in recent years because it implies the right of the couple to "plan" their family; whereas the Catholic norm is to let God plan one's family and to accept the children when (and if) God gives them—as a blessing from Him on the marital union and on society.

== See also ==
- Fertility monitor
- Billings ovulation method
- Calendar-based contraceptive methods
- Catholic teachings on sexual morality
- Couple to Couple League
- New feminism
- Theology of the Body
