= Couple to Couple League =

US-based non-profit organization

The Couple to Couple League is an international non-profit organization based in Cincinnati, Ohio, dedicated to teaching and promoting Natural Family Planning. Specifically, CCL promotes the sympto-thermal method of fertility awareness, and also promotes exclusive and continued breastfeeding. CCL views natural family planning as "a way of life, not just a method of birth regulation", and includes moral and religious values from a Roman Catholic point of view in its publications and classes.

== History ==
The Couple to Couple League was founded in 1971 by John and Sheila Kippley, and lay Catholics, with the help of Dr. Konald Prem. The League was the first organization to teach a symptoms-based method of fertility awareness that relied on all three primary fertility signs: temperature, mucus, and cervical position. CCL has grown to be the largest natural family planning provider in the United States, teaching the sympto-thermal method to almost 8,000 couples in 2004.

In addition to various chapters throughout the United States, CCL has a presence in 23 other countries. CCL focuses on countries where English or Spanish is an official language.

== Structure ==
CCL has 16 paid employees, all working at their headquarters building in Cincinnati, Ohio. In 2006, the financial rating organization Charity Navigator gave CCL a 4-star (the highest) rating for "organizational efficiency", but due to several years of declining programming expenditures, they decided to give a 1-star rating for "organizational capacity".

CCL recruits married couples who are current members of the organization as teaching couples. Teaching couples undergo training and a certification process at no further cost to themselves. Teaching couples are required to agree with and live by the moral and religious beliefs advocated by CCL. While teaching couples are volunteers who receive no compensation, their students are being charged a fee to cover materials used in the class, and a one-year membership with the Couple to Couple League. The membership includes a subscription to CCL's bi-monthly magazine and counseling or assistance in interpreting sympto-thermal charts.

Classes normally contain moral and religious content, but teachers will sometimes honor requests for private classes with no religious information.

== Publicity ==
CCL has volunteers called Promoters or Public Relations Representatives who work to increase the visibility of the organization. Like teachers, promoters are required to agree with and live by certain moral and religious requirements. Family Foundations, a bi-monthly magazine, is used both as a communication tool with CCL's current supporters and as an evangelizing tool. CCL also uses the Internet as a tool for spreading its message. In addition to ccli.org, the url birthcontrol.org redirects to the organization's website.

== Systems being taught ==
While CCL strongly encourages use of their sympto-thermal method, they also teach mucus-only and temperature-only systems. In addition, their materials contain information on a calendar-based method and a proposal for a cervical-position only system. CCL believes that by teaching all these methods, couples have more freedom in choosing a natural method with which they feel most comfortable.

CCL also teaches and promotes ecological breastfeeding, a stricter variant of LAM. Like LAM, ecological breastfeeding provides guidelines for identifying and extending the natural period of infertility caused by breastfeeding. The Seven Standards of ecological breastfeeding were developed by Sheila Kippley. The first edition of her book Breastfeeding and Natural Child Spacing was published in 1969. CCL was recognized as an authoritative source of information on breastfeeding amenorrhea in a magazine published by La Leche League, an international breastfeeding support organization. The popular fertility awareness writer Katie Singer has written about the important role Sheila Kippley and CCL have played in conducting and promoting research on lactational amenorrhea.

== See also ==
- Billings ovulation method
- Creighton Model Fertility Care System
- Fertility awareness
