= John Michael Haas =

American Catholic moral theologian and bioethicist

John Michael Haas is an American Catholic moral theologian, bioethicist, educator, and author. He served as president of The National Catholic Bioethics Center from 1996 to 2019 and later as president emeritus and senior fellow. He has held the John Cardinal Krol Chair of Moral Theology at Saint Charles Borromeo Seminary and has served in advisory and appointed roles related to Catholic bioethics, including appointments to the Pontifical Academy for Life.

== Education ==
Haas received a Ph.D. in moral theology from The Catholic University of America and a Licentiate in Moral Theology from the University of Fribourg. He also studied at the University of Chicago Divinity School and LMU Munich.

== Career ==
Haas taught moral theology at the Pontifical College Josephinum and at Saint Charles Borromeo Seminary. From 1990 to 1996, he was the inaugural holder of the John Cardinal Krol Chair of Moral Theology at Saint Charles Borromeo Seminary.

In 1996, Haas became president of The National Catholic Bioethics Center, an organization based in Philadelphia that provides Catholic bioethical analysis and consultation. He served in that role for more than twenty-two years, retiring from the presidency in 2019.

In 2019, Archbishop Charles J. Chaput appointed Haas to the John Cardinal Krol Chair of Moral Theology at Saint Charles Borromeo Seminary.

== Ecclesial appointments ==
Haas has served as a consultant to the Committee for Pro-Life Activities and the Health Care Subcommittee of the Committee on Doctrine of the United States Conference of Catholic Bishops.

In 2006, Pope Benedict XVI appointed Haas as an ordinary member of the Pontifical Academy for Life. In 2010, Benedict XVI appointed him to the academy's governing council.

== International Institute for Culture ==
Haas founded the International Institute for Culture in Philadelphia in 1989 and has served as its president.

== Honors ==
In 2019, Haas and his wife, Martha, were named to the Order of St. Gregory the Great during a prayer service in Philadelphia at which local Catholics received papal honors.
