= Humanae vitae and Poland =

Birth control controversy

Humanae vitae and Poland refers to the birth control controversy between the Communist Polish government and the Roman Catholic Church. Humanae vitae was essential for the Church in Poland to continue its struggle with the government.

== Background ==
The Catholic Church in Poland suffered much during German occupation but its persecution continued and even intensified under the Stalinist regimes until 1956. With the change of leadership to Władysław Gomułka, relations improved, but continued to be difficult. Attempts to threaten the Church and paint it as anti-modern and reactionary became more subtle. One element was a governmental campaign for abortion and birth control. This took place against the background of the largest birth rate in Europe. The population grew annually by 500,000 persons. About 57,000 abortions were reported in the first quarter of 1960. The Polish hierarchy responded forcefully, by placing Poland in the millennium year of its Christianisation under the theme "Respect for life".

== Cardinal Wyszyński ==
In the following years, Cardinal Stefan Wyszyński campaigned hard against birth control and abortion, claiming that they are immoral and unnecessary since Poland was large enough to feed not only the existing thirty, but eighty million Poles. Gomułka replied publicly, asking the Church for miraculous means to solve the nation's food and economic problems especially in housing and employment.

- The Polish state accepts that the Church cannot alter its position on birth control, but she should display more understanding for a modern society. Instead she refuses to live in the spirit of coexistence and tolerance and is disloyal to the Polish State.

Gomułka and his government succeeded in large Polish cities like Warsaw, where according to statistics, birth control was very much in fashion. Cardinal Wyszyński was therefore concerned about the "growing fear of professing faith in the Polish countryside and the need to fight for its Catholic social and cultural identity and autonomy" He needed Vatican support and handed Pope Paul VI a letter of thanks for Humanae vitae, signed by Polish physicians including 100 university professors. A second letter to the Pope was signed by 100 large families some of which had more than a dozen children.

For the Church in Poland, birth control, as part of the ongoing struggle with the regime, was not only a matter of theology, it was also a matter of continued Church influence and survival. A change of birth control policy by the Vatican in Humanae vitae could have implied a major loss of face, and a weakening of the hierarchy of the Catholic Church within Poland.

== Bibliography ==
- Micewski, Andrzej (1984). Cardinal Wyszynski, A biography, Harcourt. New York. ISBN 9780151157853.
- Korrespondenz, Herder (1960–1968). Orbis Catholicus. Freiburg.
