= Pontifical Commission on Birth Control =

1960s Vatican committee on birth control

The Pontifical Commission on Birth Control was a committee within the Roman Curia tasked with analyzing the modern impact of birth control on the Roman Catholic Church. The disagreements within the commission ultimately led to the publication of the encyclical Humanae vitae.

== Establishment by John XXIII ==
With the appearance of the first oral contraceptives in 1960, dissenters in the church argued for a reconsideration of the church positions. In 1963 Pope John XXIII established a commission of six European non-theologians to study questions of birth control and population. Neither John XXIII nor Paul VI wanted the almost three thousand bishops and other clerics then in Rome for the Second Vatican Council to address the birth control issue even though many of these bishops expressed their desire to bring this pressing pastoral issue before the council.

== Role of Paul VI ==
After John XXIII's death in 1963, Pope Paul VI added theologians to the commission and over three years expanded it to 72 members from five continents (including 16 theologians, 13 physicians and 5 women without medical credentials, with an executive committee of 16 bishops, including 7 cardinals.)

== Majority report ==
The commission produced a report in 1966, proposing that artificial birth control was not intrinsically evil and that Catholic couples should be allowed to decide for themselves about the methods to be employed. This report was approved by 64 of the 69 members voting. According to this majority report, use of contraceptives should be regarded as an extension of the already accepted cycle method:

The acceptance of a lawful application of the calculated sterile periods of the woman – that the application is legitimate presupposes right motives – makes a separation between the sexual act which is explicitly intended and its reproductive effect which is intentionally excluded.

The tradition has always rejected seeking this separation with a contraceptive intention for motives spoiled by egoism and hedonism, and such seeking can never be admitted. The true opposition is not to be sought between some material conformity to the physiological processes of nature and some artificial intervention. For it is natural to man to use his skill in order to put under human control what is given by physical nature. The opposition is really to be sought between one way of acting which is contraceptive and opposed to a prudent and generous fruitfulness, and another way which is, in an ordered relationship to responsible fruitfulness and which has a concern for education and all the essential, human and Christian values.

== Minority report ==
One commission member, American Jesuit theologian John Ford (with the assistance of American theologian Germain Grisez) drafted a minority report working paper that was signed by Ford and three other theologian priests on the commission, stating that the church should not and could not change its long-standing teaching. Even though intended for the Pope only, the commission's report and two working papers (the minority report and the majority's rebuttal to it) were leaked to the press in 1967, raising public expectations of liberalization.

The rationale for issuing the minority report was spelled out:

If it should be declared that contraception is not evil in itself, then we should have to concede frankly that the Holy Spirit had been on the side of the Protestant churches in 1930 [when Casti connubii was promulgated] and in 1951. It should likewise have to be admitted that for a half a century the Spirit failed to protect Pius XI, Pius XII, and a large part of the Catholic hierarchy from a very serious error. This would mean that the leaders of the church, acting with extreme imprudence, had condemned thousands of innocent human acts, forbidding, under pain of eternal damnation, a practice which would now be sanctioned. The fact can neither be denied nor ignored that these same acts would now be declared licit on the grounds of principles cited by the Protestants, which Popes and Bishops have either condemned, or at least not approved.

== Papal decision ==
However, Paul VI explicitly rejected his commission's recommendations in the text of Humanae vitae, noting the 72-member commission had not been unanimous. Four theologian priests had dissented, and one cardinal and two bishops had voted that contraception was inhonestus – significantly Cardinal Alfredo Ottaviani, the commission's president and Bishop Carlo Colombo, the papal theologian, as well as Archbishop Leo Binz of St. Paul/Minneapolis. Humanae vitae did, however, explicitly allow the modern forms of natural family planning that were then being developed.

In a 2019 BBC podcast on papal infallibility it was argued that Paul VI was bound by his predecessor's ruling in Casti connubii in December 1930, that was itself partly a reply to the Anglican church opinion that was approved at the 1930 Lambeth Conference.

== Members ==
Members of the commission, other than theologian and lay members, were:

- President:
  - Cardinal Alfredo Ottaviani (Italy)
- Vice-presidents:
  - Cardinal Julius Döpfner (Germany)
  - Cardinal John Carmel Heenan (England)
- Cardinal members:
  - Valerian Gracias (India)
  - Joseph Lefèbvre (France)
  - Lawrence Shehan (United States)
  - Leo Joseph Suenens (Belgium)
- Episcopal members:
  - Leo Binz (United States)
  - Carlo Colombo (Italy)
  - John Francis Dearden (United States)
  - Claude Dupuy (France)
  - Thomas Morris (Ireland)
  - José Rafael Pulido Méndez (Venezuela)
  - Joseph Maria Reuss (Germany)
  - Karol Wojtyła (Poland)
  - Jean Baptiste Zoa (Cameroon)

== See also ==
- Catholic theology of sexuality
- Christian views on birth control
- Pontifical commission
