= Klaus Demmer =

The Reverend Klaus Demmer MSC
- Born: May 27, 1931; Münster, Germany
- Died: July 18, 2014 (aged 83); Münster, Germany

Ecclesiastical career
- Religion: Christianity (Roman Catholic)
- Church: Latin Church
- Ordained: 1957 (priest)

Academic background
- Education: Pontifical Gregorian University
- Thesis: (1961)

Academic work
- Discipline: Theology
- Sub-discipline: Moral theology
- Institutions: Pontifical Gregorian University
- Notable students: James F. Keenan

Klaus Demmer, MSC (1931-2014) was a Catholic priest and theologian. Born in Münster, Germany, he was a professor who taught moral theology at the Gregorian University in Rome from 1970 to 2003, and was the first non-Jesuit to do so. He was also a co-founder of the International Academy for Marital Spirituality (INTAMS). He was far better known to European theologians than to Americans or the English-speaking world, but two of his books were translated into English: Shaping the Moral Life: An Approach to Moral Theology (trans. Roberto Dell'Oro, ed. James Keenan, Washington, D.C., 2000), a translation of the manuscript Einführung in die Moraltheologie; and Living the Truth: A Theory of Action (trans. Brian McNeil, Washington D.C., 2010).
