= The National Catholic Bioethics Quarterly =

- Discipline: bioethics, medical ethics
- Language: English
- Edited by: Edward J. Furton

Publication details
- History: 2001-present
- Publisher: National Catholic Bioethics Center (United States)
- Frequency: Quarterly

Standard abbreviations
- ISO 4: Natl. Cathol. Bioeth. Q.

Indexing
- ISSN: 1532-5490 (print); 1938-1646 (web)
- LCCN: 00212875
- OCLC no.: 45407983

Links
- Journal homepage; Online access

The National Catholic Bioethics Quarterly is a peer-reviewed journal that examines ethical, philosophical, and theological questions generated by the continuing progress of modern medicine and technology. It is published by the National Catholic Bioethics Center to foster inquiry on moral issues. The journal is edited by Edward Furton. Online access provided by the Philosophy Documentation Center.

== Awards ==
- 2015
- 2012
- 2010
- 2008
- 2005
- 2003

1st Place for General Excellence in a Scholarly Magazine, Catholic Press Association

== See also ==
- List of ethics journals
