= Creighton Model FertilityCare System =

Natural family planning method

Creighton Model / FertilityCare

Background
- Type: Behavioral
- First use: 1980

Failure rates (first year)
- Perfect use: 0.5%
- Typical use: 3.2%

Usage
- Reversibility: Immediate
- User reminders: Accurate instruction & daily charting are key.
- Clinic review: None

Advantages and disadvantages
- STI protection: No
- Period advantages: Prediction
- Weight gain: No
- Benefits: Low direct cost; no side effects; in accord with Catholic teachings; may be used to aid pregnancy achievement

The Creighton Model FertilityCare System (Creighton Model, FertilityCare, CrMS) is a form of natural family planning which involves identifying the fertile period during a woman's menstrual cycle. The Creighton Model was developed by Thomas Hilgers, the founder and director of the Pope Paul VI Institute. This model, like the Billings ovulation method, is based on observations of cervical mucus to track fertility. Creighton can be used for both avoiding pregnancy and achieving pregnancy.

== Conceptual basis ==
Hilgers describes the Creighton Model as being based on "a standardized modification of the Billings ovulation method (BOM)", which was developed by John and Evelyn Billings in the 1960s. The Billingses issued a paper refuting the claim that the CrMS represents a standardization of the BOM. In their view, these concepts are two different methods and should not be seen as interchangeable.

== Effectiveness ==
For avoiding pregnancy, the perfect-use failure rate of Creighton was 0.5%, which means that for each year that 1,000 couples using this method perfectly, that there are 5 unintended pregnancies. The typical-use failure rate, representing the fraction of couples using this method that actually had an unintended pregnancy, is reported as 3.2%.

For achieving pregnancy, no large clinical trials have been performed comparing ART and NaProTechnology. Only observational one-arm studies have been published so far. In the larger of these three studies, 75% of couples trying to conceive received additional hormonal stimulation such as clomiphene.
