= Lactational amenorrhea =

Post-partum infertility due to breast feeding

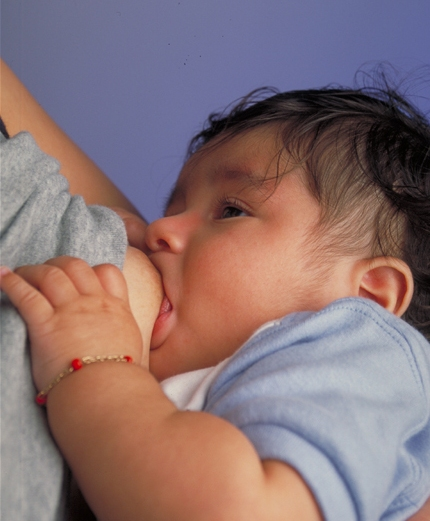
- An infant breastfeeding

Background
- Type: Behavioral
- First use: Prehistory; Ecological method 1971

Failure rates (First six months postpartum)
- Perfect use: <2%
- Typical use: ?

Usage
- Duration effect: Up to 6 months (longer in some cases, with greater failure rate)
- Reversibility: Yes
- User reminders: Adherence to protocols
- Clinic review: None

Advantages and disadvantages
- STI protection: No
- Periods: Absent
- Benefits: No external drugs or clinic visits required

Lactational amenorrhea, also called postpartum infertility, is the temporary postnatal infertility that occurs when a woman is amenorrheic (not menstruating) and fully breastfeeding.

== Physiology ==
=== Hormonal pathways and neuroendocrine control ===
Breastfeeding delays the resumption of normal ovarian cycles by disrupting the pattern of pulsatile release of gonadotropin-releasing hormone (GnRH) from the hypothalamus and hence luteinizing hormone (LH) from the pituitary. The plasma concentrations of follicle-stimulating hormone (FSH) during lactation are sufficient to induce follicle growth, but the inadequate pulsatile LH signal results in a reduced estradiol production by these follicles. When follicle growth and estradiol secretion increase to normal, lactation prevents the generation of a normal preovulatory LH surge and follicles either fail to rupture, or become atretic or cystic. Only when lactation declines sufficiently to allow generation of a normal preovulatory LH surge to occur will ovulation take place with the formation of a corpus luteum of variable normality. Thus lactation delays the resumption of normal ovarian cyclicity by disrupting but not totally inhibiting, the normal pattern of release of GnRH by the hypothalamus. The mechanism of disruption of GnRH release remains unknown.

In women, hyperprolactinemia is often associated with amenorrhea, a condition that resembles the physiological situation during lactation (lactational amenorrhea). Mechanical detection of suckling increases prolactin levels in the body to increase milk synthesis. Excess prolactin may inhibit the menstrual cycle directly, by a suppressive effect on the ovary, or indirectly, by decreasing the release of GnRH.

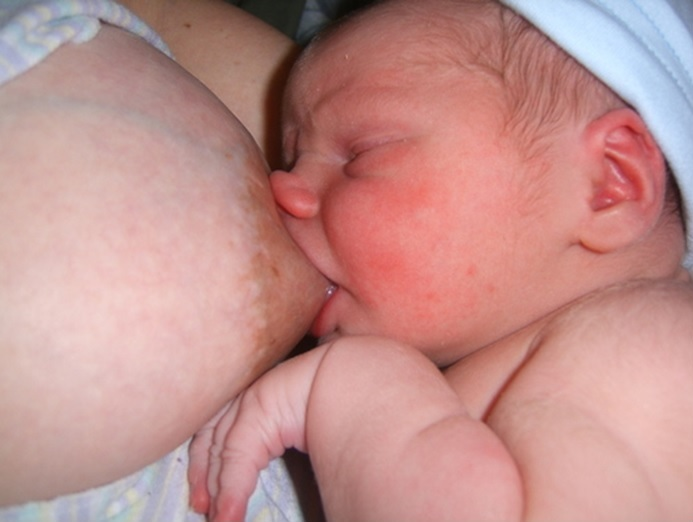
Suckling is a pivotal factor in maintaining lactational amenorrhea postpartum.

=== Suckling stimulus ===
Suckling intensity directly correlates with the duration of the amenorrheal period following birth. Suckling intensity has several dynamic components: frequency of suckling, duration of the suckling bout, and duration of suckling in a 24 hour period. It is not clear which of these plays the most critical role in maintaining amenorrhea. Suckling intensity is highly variable across populations. Studies of U.S. and Scottish women show that at least six bouts per day and 60 minutes of suckling in a 24-hour period will typically sustain amenorrhea. Concurrent studies of !Kung women in Botswana and Gainj women in Papua New Guinea have shown that very frequent, very short suckling bouts of about 3 minutes, 40 to 50 times per day correlate with typical amenorrhea of up to two years postpartum.

When an infant suckles, sensory receptors in the nipple send a signal to the anterior pituitary gland in the brain, which secretes prolactin and oxytocin. Prolactin and oxytocin trigger the release (letdown) of milk and its ejection from the nipple in a positive feedback loop. It was previously thought that prolactin hormone, which is released by the anterior pituitary in response to the direct nerve stimulation of suckling, was responsible for creating the hormonal pathways necessary to sustain amenorrhea. Now, however, it seems that this relationship is one of correlation not causation as prolactin levels in the blood plasma are simply an indicator of suckling frequency. Suckling, and the subsequent release of prolactin, is not directly responsible for postpartum infecundity. Rather it is one mechanism that increases milk production, thereby increasing the metabolic cost of breastfeeding to mothers, which contributes to sustained infecundity.

Suckling as proxy indicator of infecundity rather than a direct, hormonal causal factor is supported in studies contrasting the nursing intensity hypothesis, which says that more intense (prolonged, frequent) breastfeeding will result in a longer period of lactational amenorrhea, and the metabolic load model, which posits that maternal energy availability will be the main factor determining postpartum amenorrhea and the timing of the return of ovarian function.

=== Lactation and energy availability ===
Postpartum ovarian function and the return of fecundity depend heavily on maternal energy availability. This is due to the relatively consistent metabolic costs of milk production across populations, which fluctuate slightly but represent a significant cost to the mother. The metabolic load hypothesis states that women with more available energy or caloric/metabolic resources will likely resume ovarian function sooner, because breastfeeding represents a proportionally lower burden on their overall metabolic function. Women with less available energy experience a proportionally higher burden due to breastfeeding and therefore have less surplus metabolic energy to invest in continued reproduction. The metabolic load model is therefore consistent with the nursing intensity hypothesis, in that more intense nursing increases the relative metabolic burden of breastfeeding on the mother. It also takes into account the overall energy supply of the mother in determining whether she has enough caloric/metabolic resources available to her to make reproduction possible. If net energy supply is high enough, a woman will resume ovarian cycling sooner despite still breastfeeding the current infant.

=== Infecundity ===
Amenorrhea itself is not necessarily an indicator of infecundity, as the return of ovarian cycling is a gradual process and full fecundity may occur before or after first postpartum menses. Additionally, spotting or the appearance of first postpartum menses can be a result of either lochia or estrogen withdrawal and not actual ovulation. Lactational amenorrhea has evolved as a mechanism for preserving the health of the mother. This period of infecundity allows the mother to focus her energy on breastfeeding as well as allow time for her body to heal between births. The frequency and durations of the feedings determine how long the mother will continue to be infecund during breastfeeding. However there is variation across different cultures. The Turkana, Gainj, and Quechua societies all breastfeed on demand until their child is around 2 years old. The timing of returned ovulation for these women is however varied. Because of this, interbirth intervals vary across these three societies.

== Return of fertility ==
Return of menstruation following childbirth varies widely among individuals. This return does not necessarily mean a woman has begun to ovulate again. The first postpartum ovulatory cycle might occur before the first menses following childbirth or during subsequent cycles. A strong relationship has been observed between the amount of suckling and the contraceptive effect, such that the combination of feeding on demand rather than on a schedule and feeding only breast milk rather than supplementing the diet with other foods will greatly extend the period of effective contraception. In fact, it was found that among the Hutterites, more frequent bouts of nursing, in addition to maintenance of feeding in the night hours, led to longer lactational amenorrhea. An additional study that references this phenomenon cross-culturally was completed in the United Arab Emirates (UAE) and has similar findings. Mothers who breastfed exclusively longer showed a longer span of lactational amenorrhea, ranging from an average of 5.3 months in mothers who breastfed exclusively for only two months to an average of 9.6 months in mothers who did so for six months.

Another factor shown to affect the length of amenorrhea was the mother's age. The older a woman was, the longer period of lactational amenorrhea she demonstrated. The same increase in length was found in multiparous women as opposed to primiparous. With regard to the use of breastfeeding as a form of contraception, most women who do not breastfeed will resume regular menstrual cycling within 1.5 to 2 months following parturition. Furthermore, the closer a woman's behavior is to the Seven Standards (see below) of ecological breastfeeding, the later (on average) her cycles will return.

Overall, there are many factors including frequency of nursing, mother's age, parity, and introduction of supplemental foods into the infant's diet among others which can influence return of fecundity following pregnancy and childbirth and thus the contraceptive benefits of lactational amenorrhea are not always reliable but are evident and variable among women. Couples who desire spacing of 18 to 30 months between children can often achieve this through breastfeeding alone, though this is not a foolproof method as return of menses is unpredictable and conception can occur in the weeks preceding the first menses.

Although the first post-partum cycle is sometimes anovulatory (reducing the likelihood of becoming pregnant again before having a post-partum period), subsequent cycles are almost always ovulatory and therefore must be considered fertile. For women exclusively breastfeeding ovulation tends to return after their first menses after the 56 days postpartum time period. Supplementing nutritional intake can lead to an earlier return of menses and ovulation than exclusive breastfeeding. Nursing more frequently for a shorter amount of time was shown to be more successful in prolonging amenorrhea than nursing longer but less frequently. The continuing of breastfeeding, while introducing solids after 6 months, to 12 months were shown to have an efficiency rate of 92.6 – 96.3 percent in pregnancy prevention. Because of this some women find that breastfeeding interferes with fertility even after ovulation has resumed.

The Seven Standards: Phase 1 of Ecological Breastfeeding

1. Breastfeed exclusively for the first six months of life; don't use other liquids and solids, not even water.
2. Pacify or comfort your baby at your breasts.
3. Don't use bottles and don't use pacifiers.
4. Sleep with your baby for night feedings.
5. Sleep with your baby for a daily-nap feeding.
6. Nurse frequently day and night, and avoid schedules.
7. Avoid any practice that restricts nursing or separates you from your baby.

Phase 1 is the time of exclusive breastfeeding and thus usually lasts six to eight months.

== Use as birth control ==
For women who follow the suggestions and meet the criteria (listed below), lactational amenorrhea method (LAM) is >98% effective during the first six months postpartum.

- Breastfeeding must be the infant's only (or almost only) source of nutrition. Feeding formula, pumping instead of nursing, and feeding solids all reduce the effectiveness of LAM.
- The infant must breastfeed at least every four hours during the day and at least every six hours at night.
- The infant must be less than six months old.
- The mother must not have had a period after 56 days post-partum (when determining fertility, bleeding prior to 56 days post-partum can be ignored).
- And to take full advantage of LAM, it is best that the baby's face not be covered when feeding. Routinely covering the baby reduces the baby's access to oxygen and visual contact with the mother, which trains the baby to speed up the suckling process and thus reduces the time period, rendering LAM less effective.

If not combined with barrier contraceptives, spermicides, hormonal contraceptives, or intrauterine devices, LAM may be considered natural family planning by the Roman Catholic Church.

== Cross cultural use of lactational amenorrhea ==
The use of lactational amenorrhea method (LAM) can be seen across the world. It is used in many different societies to varying extents. LAM can be used by itself or in combination with other methods. There are multiple examples of LAM use covered in studies conducted about postpartum birth control methods in various countries and areas of the world. Additionally, the connection between LAM use and infant nutrition and health has been examined in different contexts. Beyond the physiological factors that influence lactational amenorrhea, cross cultural differences can help account for many of the variations in lactational amenorrhea.

In Turkey, exploration of LAM has exposed a distinct lack of knowledge surrounding the connection between lactational amenorrhea and birth control. However, these findings are contrasted with the fact that mothers demonstrated a desire to learn about LAM as a method of contraception. This lack of knowledge is not necessarily evident in other parts of the globe as exemplified in South-Eastern Hungary with the use of post-partum contraceptives. There is an imbalance of birth control method usage postpartum. LAM makes up nearly double the usage of other contraceptive usages. One of the primary factors influencing choice of contraceptive in this area is level of education. A higher level of education correlates to a bigger chance of utilizing effective contraception methods rather than LAM.

Nutrition and health of both the mother and infant are connected to the use of LAM in the international community. By promoting LAM, exclusive breastfeeding for the infant becomes more prominent in order to make LAM as effective as possible. In Egypt, this has been shown to combat poor nutritional practices of mothers. To make sure infants are getting fully enriching breast milk, mothers must take their own nutritional practices seriously, leading to an overall improvement of nutrition. An area in Kenya further provides evidence that there is a substantial link between proper nutrition and LAM, specifically with infants. This exclusive use of breastfeeding has a positive impact on preventing pregnancy as well as reducing child mortality. The promotion of LAM has shown an increase in breast feeding overall, resulting in better prospects of survival for infants.
