= Primacy of conscience =

Concept in Catholic moral theology

Primacy of conscience is a concept in Catholic moral theology that holds that one must obey one's conscience above all else, even the dictates of Catholic dogma, so long as that conscience is "well-formed". A "well-formed" conscience is one that has considered Catholic dogma deeply, seriously, and in good faith.

The concept is cited in Cardinal Newman's Apologia Pro Vita Sua. It found expression in papal teaching in Pope Paul VI's Gaudium et spes, part of the constitutions of Vatican II. It was also expanded upon in the Winnipeg Statement of the Canadian Conference of Catholic Bishops in 1968.

Then-Cardinal Ratzinger, the future Pope Benedict XVI summarised the concept in his Commentary on the Documents of Vatican II, published in 1968:

Over the pope as the expression of the binding claim of ecclesiastical authority there still stands one's own conscience, which must be obeyed before all else, if necessary even against the requirement of ecclesiastical authority.

He went even further in 1969, stating that:

Criticism of papal declarations will be possible and necessary to the degree that they do not correspond with Scripture and the Creed, that is, with the belief of the Church. Where there is neither unanimity in the Church nor clear testimony of the sources, then no binding decision is possible; if one is formally made, then its preconditions are lacking, and therefore the question of its legitimacy must be raised.

== See also ==
- Inward light
