= John and Evelyn Billings =

Australian physicians

John Billings AM, KC*SG
- Born: 5 March 1918; Melbourne, Victoria
- Died: 1 April 2007 (aged 89); Richmond, Victoria
- Education: Xavier College
- Alma mater: University of Melbourne
- Occupation: Physician
- Notable work: Jointly pioneered the natural method of family planning known as the Billings Ovulation Method

Evelyn Livingston Billings AM, DCSG
- Born: Evelyn Livingston Thomas; 8 February 1918
- Died: 16 February 2013 (aged 95); Melbourne, Victoria
- Occupation: Physician
- Notable work: Jointly pioneered the natural method of family planning known as the Billings Ovulation Method

John Billings AM, KC*SG (5 March 1918 – 1 April 2007) and his wife, Evelyn Livingston Billings AM, DCSG (née Thomas; 8 February 1918 – 16 February 2013), were Australian physicians who pioneered the natural method of family planning known initially as the Ovulation Method, then the Ovulation Method Billings, specified by the WHO in 1978 and finally as the Billings Ovulation Method.

== Biography ==
John Billings was born in Melbourne and was educated at Xavier College, and at the University of Melbourne where he received his Doctor of Medicine degree.

In 1953, he began work on a method of natural family planning, involving observation of several indicators of fertility and infertility, gradually focusing on the changes to cervical mucus patterns of sensation. His wife, Evelyn, became involved from 1963. The couple founded the World Organisation of the Ovulation Method Billings (WOOMB) as the body responsible for teaching the method throughout the world.

Although Billings maintained his career as a consulting neurologist to St Vincent's Hospital, he and his wife spent a large part of each year traveling to other countries, and training teachers in the Billings Ovulation Method, lecturing to doctors and students, and establishing teaching centers. The Method pioneered by the Billings was approved by both the Catholic Church and used by the World Health Organization. It was the only natural method accepted by the Chinese Government.

=== Honours ===
In 1969, John Billings was appointed a Knight Commander of the Order of St Gregory the Great (KCSG) by Pope Paul VI. In 2003, Pope John Paul II added a star to this papal knighthood (KC*SG). He was also made a Member of the Order of Australia in 1991.

In 2003, Evelyn Billings was made a Dame Commander of the Order of St Gregory the Great.

=== Death ===
John Billings died, aged 89, on 1 April 2007, at a Richmond aged care centre, survived by his wife, children and large extended family. Evelyn died on 16 February 2013, aged 95, following a brief illness.
