= National Catholic Bioethics Center =

Conservative Catholic think tank

- Headquarters: Philadelphia, Pennsylvania
- President: John A. Di Camillo
- Website: https://ncbcenter.org

The National Catholic Bioethics Center (NCBC) is a not-for-profit research center located in Philadelphia, Pennsylvania, after previous locations in St. Louis (1972–1985) and Boston (1985–2004). Its mission is "to uphold the dignity of the human person in health care and biomedical research, thereby sharing in the ministry of Jesus Christ and his Church." The chairman of the Board of Directors is Gregory M. Aymond, Archbishop of New Orleans. The organization publishes Ethics & Medics monthly and The National Catholic Bioethics Quarterly, as well as books including the Handbook on Critical Life Issues.

== Activities ==
The founding president of the NCBC was Albert S. Moraczewski, O.P. The staff of professional ethicists responds to hundreds of requests each year for advice on moral issues of concern to Catholics and other interested parties, via e-mail, phone, and letter. The Ph.D. ethicists include John M. Haas, Rev. Tadeusz Pacholczyk, and Marie T. Hilliard. The organization also provides moral analysis to the offices of the United States Conference of Catholic Bishops (USCCB) and to the dicasteries of the Holy See (Vatican), although the organization is not itself governed or funded by the Catholic Church.

The activities of the NCBC include education, publications, research, and public policy. The education department administers "The National Catholic Certification Program in Health Care Ethics", a year-long distance learning program that educates candidates in the fundamentals of Catholic medical-moral teaching. The program gives special emphasis to Ethical and Religious Directives for Catholic Health Care Services, a USCCB document designed to guide Catholic health care institutions.
