= TwoDay Method =

Medical method

The TwoDay Method is a Fertility awareness method used to either avoid or achieve pregnancy.

== Background ==
The TwoDay method is a simple fertility awareness method requiring users to check for cervical secretions twice a day. If secretions were not observed for two consecutive days, pregnancy is unlikely on the second. At other times, pregnancy is considered more likely.

With perfect usage, 3.5 out of 100 people will get pregnant in the first year of use and, under typical use, 13.7 out of 100 people will get pregnant in the first year.

== Limitations ==
Similar to other fertility awareness methods, the TwoDay Method requires women to abstain from vaginal sex or use a barrier method on days identified as fertile.
