= James F. Keenan =

Jesuit and moral theologian

The Reverend James F. Kennan SJ
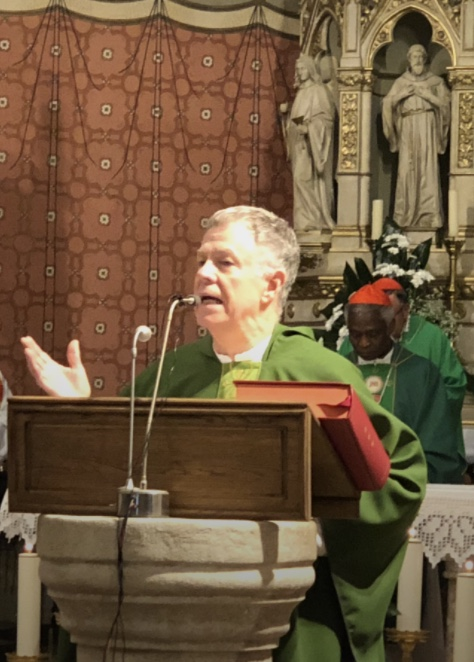
- Education: Fordham University, Weston School of Theology, Gregorian University
- Occupations: Catholic Moral Theologian, bioethicist, writer, university professor
- Title: Canisius Professor of Theology at Boston College

James F. Keenan SJ is an American Jesuit moral theologian, bioethicist, writer, and the Canisius Professor of theology at Boston College.

== Career ==
Keenan has been a Jesuit of the New York Province since 1970 and an ordained priest since 1982. He received his BA from Fordham University in 1976, his MDiv from the Weston School of Theology in 1982. He then received his STL in 1984 and his STD in 1988 from Pontifical Gregorian University in Rome, Italy.

Keenan has taught as an assistant professor of Moral Theology at Fordham University ('87-'91) and Weston Jesuit School of Theology ('91-'99). He taught as Professor of Moral Theology at the Weston Jesuit School of Theology from 1999 to 2005, after which he became a full-time member of the Boston College Theology Department as a professor of Theological Ethics. He is also visiting professor at Pontifical Athenaeum Dharmaram Vidya Kshetram and Pontifical Gregorian University.

== Bioethics ==
Keenan has been actively involved in the field of bioethics and has particular experience with bioethics concerning HIV/AIDS. He teaches such Ethics courses as "The Human Body" and "Ethical Issues of HIV/AIDS" at Boston College. Keenan has been an Advisor to the Global AIDS Interfaith Alliance since 2000, and has been a Group Leader for the Surgeon General's Task Force on Responsible Sexual Conduct (2000–2002), a Convener for the AIDS Study Group, Society of Christian Ethics (1996–2001), and is a director on the board of directors for the Society of Christian Ethics (2001-), among other positions.

== Writings and Editorial Work ==
Keenan is a columnist for Chicago Catholic, the newspaper of the Archdiocese of Chicago.

Keenan has written numerous books on HIV/AIDS and has contributed articles to several books, periodicals, and studies concerning HIV/AIDS, including "Higher Education in a Time of HIV/AIDS" The list includes books such as Catholic Ethicists on HIV/AIDS Prevention published in 2000 (for which he won the Alpha Sigma Nu National Book Award in 2002 ), Moral Wisdom: Lessons and Texts from the Catholic Tradition (2004 - second edition 2009), Paul and Virtue Ethics (co-authored with Daniel Harrington, 2010), and Goodness and Rightness in Thomas Aquinas' Summa Theologiae (1992). Some recent academic essays include "A Reconciling Work in the AIDS Century", "HIV/AIDS: The Expanding Ethical Challenge", "Theological Ethics out of the United States", and "'Ethics' After Augustine. A Survey of His Reception from 430-2000", which is to be published by the Oxford University Press. Keenan has also contributed many articles to such general periodicals as Commonweal, Church, and America - mostly, but not exclusively, concerning either ethics or bioethics. James Keenan is also a Series Editor of Moral Traditions (Georgetown University Press, 1993-).

== Other Awards and Positions ==
- Gasson Chair - Boston College
- Tuohy Chair - John Carroll University
- Board of Directors - Society of Christian Ethics
- Grant and Faculty Fellowship - Association of Theological Schools
- Editorial Board Member of Theological Studies (1991 -)
- Chair - Catholic Theological Coalition on HIV/AIDS Prevention (1997 -)
- Fellow - Center of Theological Inquiry, Princeton University

== Bibliography ==
=== Books ===
- Goodness and Rightness in Thomas Aquinas' Summa Theologiae (1992)
- Catholic Ethicists on HIV/AIDS Prevention (2000)
- Moral Wisdom: Lessons and Texts from the Catholic Tradition (2004 - second edition 2009)
- Paul and Virtue Ethics (co-authored with Daniel Harrington, 2010)
- University Ethics: How Colleges Can Build and Benefit from a Culture of Ethics (2015)
- Keenan, James F. & Mark McGreevy, eds. (2019). Street homelessness and Catholic theological ethics. Maryknoll, New York: Orbis Books.

=== Articles, chapters and other contributions ===
- "A Reconciling Work in the AIDS Century"
- "HIV/AIDS: The Expanding Ethical Challenge"
- "Theological Ethics out of the United States"
- "Ethics" in After Augustine. A Survey of His Reception from 430-2000
