= Tadeusz Pacholczyk =

American neuroscientist

Tadeusz Pacholczyk (born 1964) is an American Roman Catholic priest, neuroscientist and writer.

== Biography ==
Pacholczyk grew up in Tucson, Arizona to a Polish family. His father Andrzej Pacholczyk was a professor of astrophysics at the University of Arizona. He earned his doctorate in neuroscience from Yale University where he determined the gene sequence for the human norepinephrine transporter, which demonstrated significant amino-acid identity with the GABA transporter, thus identifying a new gene family for neurotransmitter transporter proteins. He did post-doctoral research at Harvard University and Massachusetts General Hospital where his work focused on structural studies of the Na,K-ATPase.

In 1999, he was ordained a priest, after studying in Rome. He quickly became a church spokesman on beginning-of-life and end-of-life issues. He is a proponent of the teachings of the Catholic Church in opposition to human cloning and embryonic stem cell research. (See Declaration on the Production and the Scientific and Therapeutic Use of Human Embryonic Stem Cells.) He has testified before state legislatures and been quoted in the press. Pacholczyk writes a nationally syndicated column, titled "Making Sense of Bioethics," that appears in numerous Catholic diocesan newspapers in the United States and has been reprinted in newspapers in Canada, England, Poland, and Australia. He has written on a broad range of medical ethics issues, including ethical prescription and use of opioids, use of performance-enhancing drugs in professional athletics, animal/human hybrids, artificial nutrition and hydration, conscience rights for health care providers and patients, in vitro fertilization, palliative and hospice care, and physician-assisted suicide. Since 2001, he has given several hundred presentations and invited lectures, and continues to speak widely on contemporary bioethical themes throughout the U.S., Canada, and Europe. In July 2020, he was appointed by United States Secretary of Health and Human Services Alex Azar to serve on the National Institute of Health Human Fetal Tissue Research Ethics Advisory Board.

As of 2026, Pacholczyk is a priest of the Diocese of Fall River, Massachusetts. He served as the director of education from 2003 to 2023, and as senior ethicist until 2026 at The National Catholic Bioethics Center in Philadelphia, whose long-time president, John Haas (retired 2019), served as an ordinary member of the Pontifical Academy for Life.

=== Opposing physician-assisted suicide ===
On October 7, 2012, Pacholczyk wrote a piece in the Wall Street Journal titled "Please Step Back From the Assisted-Suicide Ledge" in which he notes, "If physician-assisted suicide really represents a good choice, we need to ask: Why should only physicians be able to participate?" He follows the rhetorical question to its conclusion by noting, "Why should doctors have a monopoly on undermining public trust? Police and lifeguards could help out too."

=== Sexual Orientation Change Efforts ===
On October 22, 2018, Pacholczyk wrote a piece in the Catholic Herald titled "Sexual Orientation: Hope for restoration and healing with SOCE" (Sexual Orientation Change Efforts). He describes the measured conclusion of a review by Peter Sprigg, Senior Fellow for Policy Studies at the Family Research Council in Washington, D.C. of six studies published between 2000 and 2018 which concludes that SOCE "can be effective for some clients in bringing about significant change in some components of sexual orientation", and that "few harms were reported".

=== Ethical oversight of human scientific research ===
In December 2001, Pacholczyk testified before the Massachusetts Senate that "embryonic human life is inviolable and deserving of unconditional respect." On January 10, 2020, he wrote a piece in The Boston Pilot titled "The Foxes and the Henhouse" in which he discusses the production of two gene-edited human babies in China, and the apparent inability of the scientific establishment to provide adequate ethical regulation and oversight of research involving embryonic humans.

=== COVID-19 ===
Pacholczyk has written and commented about the ethics of COVID-19 vaccines and COVID-19 treatments. His writings and comments have addressed issues such as the rationing of medical care (such as ventilators), whether and when prisoners should be given priority to receive vaccinations for COVID-19, whether public health officials can make it mandatory for people to receive a vaccine, and whether medical treatments and vaccines derived from cell lines derived from aborted fetuses are ethical.
