= Winnipeg Statement =

Canadian Catholic Bishop's statement on the use of contraception

The Winnipeg Statement is the Canadian Conference of Catholic Bishops' statement on Pope Paul VI's 1968 papal encyclical Humanae vitae from a plenary assembly held in St. Boniface, Winnipeg, Manitoba. Published on September 27, 1968, it explains the bishops' rejection of the encyclical, which concerns human life and the regulation of birth (such as by birth control).

== Summary ==
Published two months after Humanae vitae, the Winnipeg Statement was an attempt by the Canadian Conference of Catholic Bishops to address widespread concern within the church about the prohibition of all forms of artificial contraception, and to counsel its members on how to respond to those who have difficulty accepting the directives.

It recognized that "a certain number of Catholics", in spite of being bound by the encyclical, find it "either extremely difficult or even impossible to make their own all elements of this doctrine". These

should not be considered, or consider themselves, shut off from the body of the faithful. But they should remember that their good faith will be dependent on a sincere self-examination to determine the true motives and grounds for such suspension of assent and on continued effort to understand and deepen their knowledge of the teaching of the Church.

With regard to those in that situation, "the confessor or counsellor must show sympathetic understanding and reverence for the sincere good faith of those who fail in their effort to accept some point of the encyclical."

Paragraph 26 stated:

In accord with the accepted principles of moral theology, if these persons have tried sincerely but without success to pursue a line of conduct in keeping with the given directives, they may be safely assured that, whoever honestly chooses that course which seems right to him does so in good conscience [emphasis added].

In its conclusion, the document referred to the moment of the publication of the encyclical as an "hour of crisis", but added:

The unity of the Church does not consist in a bland conformity in all ideas, but rather in a union of faith and heart, in submission to God's will and a humble but honest and ongoing search for the truth. ... We stand in union with the Bishop of Rome the successor of Peter, the sign and contributing cause of our unity with Christ and with one another. But this very union postulates such a love of the Church that we can do no less than to place all of our love and all of our intelligence at its service. If this sometimes means that in our desire to make the Church more intelligible and more beautiful we must, as pilgrims do, falter in the way or differ as to the way, no one should conclude that our common faith is lost or our loving purpose blunted.

== Reception ==
Although many episcopal conferences published statements regarding Humanae vitae, it is the Canadian bishops' statement which has been the subject of the most controversy, as has been widely interpreted as a loophole whereby Catholics may feel permitted to use birth control. Central to the debate is the role and importance of personal religious freedom of conscience.

=== Support ===
Some see the statement as an honest pastoral attempt to maintain unity of the Church in Canada. As Bishop Alexander Carter (then President of the Canadian Conference of Catholic Bishops) explained,

We faced the necessity of making a statement which many felt could not be a simple 'Amen,' a total and formal endorsement of the doctrine of the encyclical – we had to reckon with the fact of widespread dissent from some points of his teaching among the Catholic faithful, priests, theologians, and probably some of our own number.

Supporters contend that the Canadian bishops were merely trying to defend those who had not matured sufficiently in their faith, and that they were simply upholding the established doctrine expressed in Dignitatis humanae, the Vatican II Declaration on Religious Freedom. They argue that it was this document which compelled the bishops "to support the need for personal freedom when dealing with the Church's rejection of artificial contraception ... [and to insist] that married couples could only form their consciences in an atmosphere free of coercion."

Some have claimed that the statement was accepted "with satisfaction" by Pope Paul VI. Although this allegation is strongly disputed, it is worth noting that the Holy See has not published an official condemnation of the Winnipeg Statement, per se.

=== Opposition ===
The statement was met with immediate and vocal opposition, which found root especially among conservative practicing Catholic anti-abortion activists. The objections of opponents to the statement are perhaps best summarized in the writings of Vincent Foy, who contends, among other things, that the Winnipeg Statement:

- is tantamount to blasphemy, has increased dissent in the church, and is an act of disobedience to the Holy See
- has fostered support for homosexuality, the ordination of women, the "fundamental option", and abortion
- is a major factor in the crisis of vocations to the priesthood and religious life
- has facilitated anti-life and immoral government legislation
- has deprived spouses of married love, has pitted spouses against one another, has made faithful Catholic couples feel betrayed and unsupported, and has been the cause of many marital breakups
- permits extra-marital sex, and has led to a lowered respect for women
- has not only adversely affected married life in Canada but in many other countries
- has led to the killing of countless persons through abortifacient pills and devices

Foy further alleges that Cardinal Gerald Emmett Carter, one of the authors, partially repudiated the wording of the most controversial paragraph of the statement, writing in a private letter that "I am not prepared to defend paragraph 26 totally. In a sense, the phraseology was misleading and could give the impression that the bishops were saying that one was free to dissent at will from the Pope's teaching".

== Reiteration in 1969 ==
In view of calls for the Canadian bishops to officially retract the Winnipeg Statement, they issued a year later a statement in which they declared: "Nothing could be gained and much lost by an attempt to rephrase what we have said in Winnipeg. We stand squarely behind our position but we feel it is our duty to insist on a proper interpretation of that position." They added:

We wish to reiterate our positive conviction that a Catholic Christian is not free to form his conscience without consideration of the teaching of the magisterium, in the particular instance exercised by the Holy Father in an encyclical letter. It is false and dangerous to maintain that because this encyclical has not demanded "the absolute assent of faith", any Catholic may put it aside as if it had never appeared. On the contrary, such teaching in some ways imposes a great burden of responsibility on the individual conscience.

The Catholic knows that he or she may not dissent from teaching proposed as infallible. With regard to such teaching one may seek only to understand, to appreciate, to deepen one's insights.

In the presence of other authoritative teaching, exercised either by the Holy Father or by the collectivity of the bishops one must listen with respect, with openness and with the firm conviction that a personal opinion, or even the opinion of a number of theologians, ranks very much below the level of such teaching. The attitude must be one of desire to assent, a respectful acceptance of truth which bears the seal of God's Church.

In 1998, the Canadian bishops voted by secret ballot on a resolution to retract the Winnipeg Statement. It did not pass.

Calls for retraction continue, though some see the Canadian bishops' December 1, 1973, document, Statement on the Formation of Conscience, as evidence that they were trying to distance themselves from the Winnipeg Statement.

In 2008, the Canadian bishops issued a pastoral letter titled "Liberating Potential" that was unquestioned as being in full conformity with Humanae vitae, and invited all to "discover or rediscover" its message. Critics of the Winnipeg Statement saw the new document as counterbalancing what it called the "heretical" earlier statement.

Also in 2008, Canadian bishops unanimously stated that they were opposed to the appointment of the abortion provider and pro-choice advocate Henry Morgentaler to the Order of Canada, directly quoting from the Compendium of Social Doctrine. Moreover, the bishops generally advocate pro-life views through the Catholic Organization for Life and Family, the official episcopal agency dedicated to life issues.

== See also ==
- Christian views on birth control
