= Casti connubii =

1930 papal encyclical by Pius XI

Casti connubii Latin for 'Of chaste wedlock' Encyclical of Pope Pius XI
- Signature date: 31 December 1930
- Subject: On marriage
- Number: 18 of 31 of the pontificate
- Text: In Latin; In English

Casti connubii (Latin: "of chaste wedlock") is a papal encyclical promulgated by Pope Pius XI on 31 December 1930 in response to the Lambeth Conference of the Anglican Communion. It stressed the sanctity of marriage, prohibited Catholics from using any form of artificial birth control, and reaffirmed the prohibition on abortion. It also explained the authority of church doctrine on moral matters, and advocated that civil governments follow the lead of the church in this area.

== Topics ==
Casti connubii was a response to the Lambeth Conference of 1930 in which the Anglican Communion approved the use of birth control in limited circumstances. It covered four major topics: the sanctity of marriage, opposition to eugenics, positions on birth control and the purpose of sexuality, and reaffirmation of the prohibition on abortion.

=== Sanctity of marriage ===
Pope Pius XI's encyclical references and confirms Arcanum (1880) on Christian marriage by Pope Leo XIII. Catholic doctrine has always considered matrimony to be a most holy state of life for those called to the married life (see Thomas Aquinas in the Summa Theologica; or Augustine of Hippo's On the Goods of Marriage). This encyclical reaffirms that marriage is a sacrament, and a means to sanctifying grace.

The encyclical also affirms the church's opposition to adultery and divorce, and its support of wives as homemakers. It calls for wives to be obedient to their husbands, while commanding husbands to love their wives as "Christ loved His Church".

This ... does not deny or take away the liberty which fully belongs to the woman both in view of her dignity as a human person, and in view of her most noble office as wife and mother and companion; nor does it bid her obey her husband's every request if not in harmony with right reason or with the dignity due to wife; ... For if the man is the head, the woman is the heart, and as he occupies the chief place in ruling, so she may and ought to claim for herself the chief place in love.

=== Opposition to eugenics ===
Casti connubii speaks out against the eugenics laws, then popular, that forbade those deemed 'unfit' from marrying and having children: "Those who act in this way are at fault in losing sight of the fact that the family is more sacred than the State and that men are begotten not for the earth and for time, but for Heaven and eternity."

He also expresses a strong sentiment in favor of good breeding and even goes as far as to say "that which is of a Eugenic indication may and must be accepted."

It also took a strong stand against forced sterilizations. Pius XI stated that if no crime has taken place and there is no cause present for grave punishment, magistrates have no direct power over the bodies of their subjects. He cited Thomas Aquinas:

St. Thomas teaches this when inquiring whether human judges for the sake of preventing future evils can inflict punishment, he admits that the power indeed exists as regards certain other forms of evil, but justly and properly denies it as regards the maiming of the body.

=== Birth control and the purpose of sexuality ===
Prior to this encyclical, it was believed by some Catholics that the only licit reason for sexual intercourse was an attempt to create children. At the time, there was no official church position on any non-procreative purposes of intercourse. Casti connubii does repeat several times that the conjugal act is intrinsically tied with procreation:

... any use whatsoever of matrimony exercised in such a way that the act is deliberately frustrated in its natural power to generate life is an offense against the law of God and of nature, and those who indulge in such are branded with the guilt of a grave sin.

However, Casti connubii also acknowledges the unitive aspect of intercourse as licit:

Nor are those considered as acting against nature who in the married state use their right in the proper manner although on account of natural reasons either of time or of certain defects, new life cannot be brought forth. For in matrimony as well as in the use of the matrimonial rights there are also secondary ends, such as mutual aid, the cultivating of mutual love, and the quieting of concupiscence which husband and wife are not forbidden to consider so long as they are subordinated to the primary end and so long as the intrinsic nature of the act is preserved.

Casti connubii also reaffirms the dignity of the human conjugal act as distinct from the conjugal acts of animals, by its volitive nature; that is, the act is not merely biological but rooted in the will and therefore a personal act.

The 'natural reasons of time or of certain defects' are universally accepted as meaning menopause and infertility. This paragraph thus means menopausal and infertile couples may morally engage in intercourse, even though there is no possibility of children resulting from the act.

The 'natural reasons of time' is interpreted by some to also mean the infertile portion of a woman's menstrual cycle. The practice of avoiding pregnancy by abstaining from sexual relations when the woman is fertile (natural family planning) was first addressed in rulings by the Sacred Penitentiary in 1853 and 1880, which declared the practice moral. However, a few Catholic theologians continued to hold that such practices were equivalent to contraception and thus immoral, and some historians consider two 1951 speeches by Pope Pius XII to be the first explicit church acceptance of natural family planning. The church's view of contraception was explored further in the 1968 encyclical Humanae vitae by Pope Paul VI, and by Pope John Paul II's lecture series later entitled Theology of the Body.

=== Abortion ===
This encyclical repeats the church's condemnation of abortion in all circumstances. It also draws a connection between contracepting couples and couples that have abortions: "... those wicked parents who seek to remain childless, and failing in this, are not ashamed to put their offspring to death."

== Reactions and impact ==
In a 1932 article published in The Nation, Margaret Sanger gave her personal reaction to the encyclical, saying that it was an obstacle to general approval of the birth-control movement by political leaders unwilling to oppose the leadership of the church. She also asserts that it is "illogical, not in accord with science, and definitely against social welfare and race improvement".

Casti connubii is most noted for its anti-contraception position. Unlike major Protestant denominations, the Catholic Church has continued its opposition to artificial birth control. This encyclical, along with Humanae vitae, has come to represent that stance.

== Bibliography ==
- "The encyclical Casti connubii". Vatican website.
