= Humanae vitae =

1968 encyclical by Pope Paul VI

Humanae vitae Latin for 'Of Human Life' Encyclical of Pope Paul VI
- Signature date: 25 July 1968
- Subject: About birth control
- Number: 7 of 7 of the pontificate
- Text: In Latin; In English

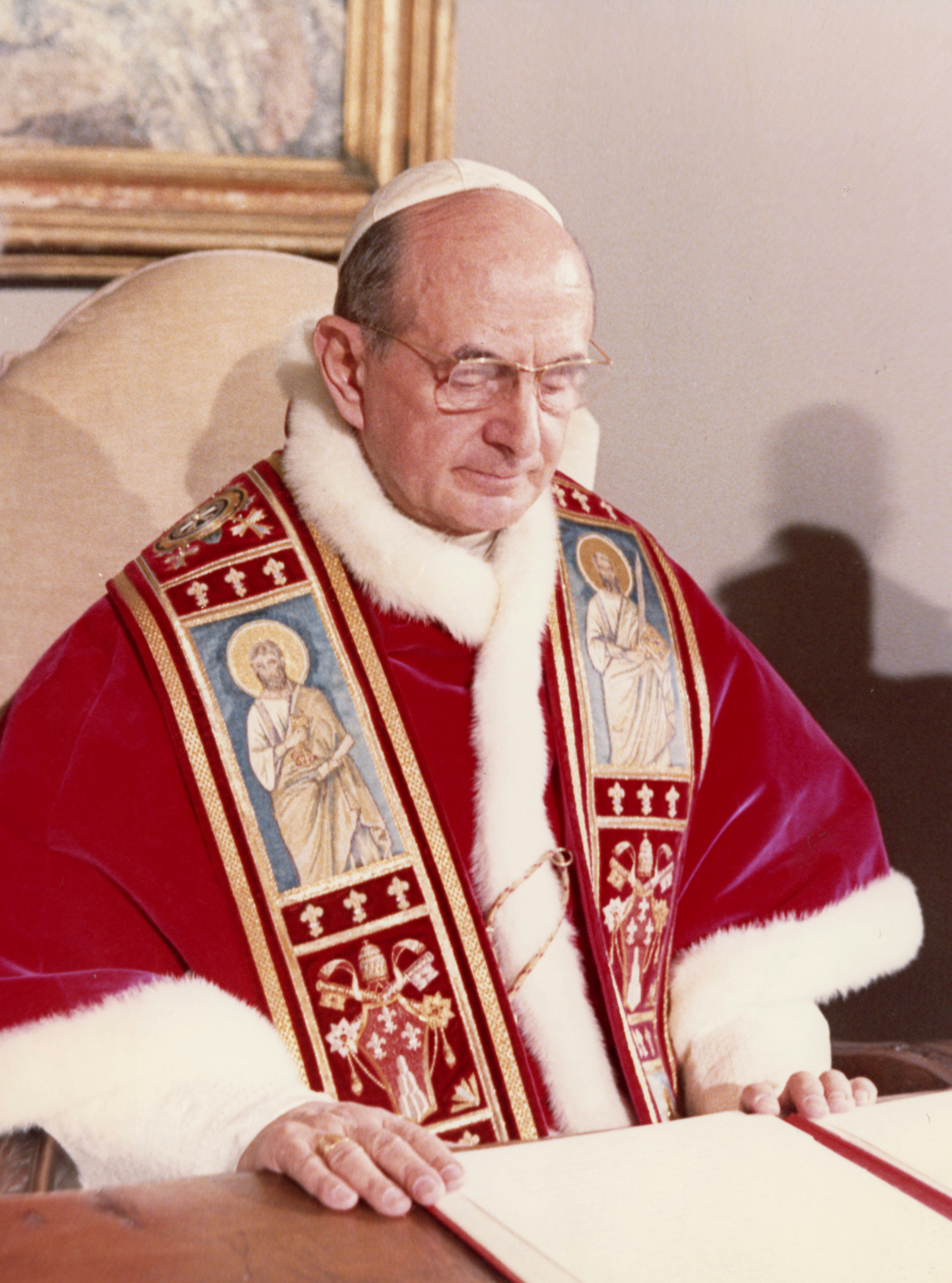
Pope Paul VI signed Humanae vitae on 25 July 1968.

Humanae vitae (Latin, meaning 'Of Human Life') is an encyclical written by Pope Paul VI and dated 25 July 1968. The text was issued at a Vatican press conference on 29 July. Subtitled On the Regulation of Birth, it re-affirmed the teaching of the Catholic Church regarding married love, responsible parenthood, and the rejection of artificial contraception. In formulating his teaching he explained why he did not accept the conclusions of the Pontifical Commission on Birth Control established by his predecessor, Pope John XXIII, a commission he himself had expanded.

Mainly because of its restatement of the Church's opposition to artificial contraception, the encyclical was politically controversial. It solidified a traditional interpretation of Church moral teaching on the sanctity of life in the context of human intervention in fertility and the procreative and unitive nature of Catholic conjugal relations.

It was the last of Paul's seven encyclicals.

== Summary ==
=== Affirmation of traditional teaching ===
In this encyclical Paul VI reaffirmed the Catholic Church's view of marriage and marital relations and a continued condemnation of "artificial" birth control. Referencing two papal committees and numerous independent experts examining new developments in artificial birth control, Paul VI built on the teachings of his predecessors, especially Pius XI, Pius XII and John XXIII, all of whom had insisted on the divine obligations of the marital partners in light of their partnership with God the creator.

=== Doctrinal basis ===
Paul VI himself, even as commission members issued their personal views over the years, always reaffirmed the teachings of the Church, repeating them more than once in the first years of his pontificate.

To Pope Paul VI, marital relations were much more than a union of two people. In his view, they constitute a union of the loving couple with a loving God, in which the two persons generate the matter for the body, while God creates the unique soul of a person. For this reason, Paul VI teaches in the first sentence of Humanae vitae, that the "transmission of human life is a most serious role in which married people collaborate freely and responsibly with God the Creator." This is divine partnership, so Paul VI does not allow for arbitrary human decisions, which may limit divine providence. According to Paul VI, marital relations are a source of great joy, but also of difficulties and hardships. The question of human procreation with God, exceeds in the view of Paul VI specific disciplines such as biology, psychology, demography or sociology. According to Paul VI, married love takes its origin from God, who is love, and from this basic dignity, he defines his position:

Love is total – that very special form of personal friendship in which husband and wife generously share everything, allowing no unreasonable exceptions and not thinking solely of their own convenience. Whoever really loves his partner loves not only for what he receives, but loves that partner for the partner's own sake, content to be able to enrich the other with the gift of himself.

The encyclical opens with an assertion of the competency of the magisterium of the Catholic Church to decide questions of morality. It then goes on to observe that circumstances often dictate that married couples should limit the number of children, and that the sexual act between husband and wife is still worthy even if it can be foreseen not to result in procreation. Nevertheless, it is held that the sexual act must retain its intrinsic relationship to the procreation of human life.

Every action specifically intended to prevent procreation is forbidden, except in medically necessary circumstances. Therapeutic means necessary to cure diseases are exempted, even if a foreseeable impediment to procreation should result, but only if infertility is not directly intended. This is held to directly contradict the moral order which was established by God. Abortion, even for therapeutic reasons, is absolutely forbidden, as is sterilization, even if temporary. Therapeutic means which induce infertility are allowed (e.g., hysterectomy), if they are not specifically intended to cause infertility (e.g., the uterus is cancerous, so the preservation of life is intended). If there are well grounded reasons (arising from the physical or psychological condition of husband or wife, or from external circumstances), natural family planning methods (abstaining from intercourse during certain parts of the menstrual cycle) are allowed, since they take advantage of a faculty provided by nature.

The acceptance of artificial methods of birth control is then claimed to result in several negative consequences, among them a general lowering of moral standards resulting from sex without consequences, and the danger that men may reduce women to being a mere instrument for the satisfaction of [their] own desires; finally, abuse of power by public authorities, and a false sense of autonomy.

=== Appeal to natural law and conclusion ===
Public authorities should oppose laws which undermine natural law; scientists should further study effective methods of natural birth control; doctors should further familiarize themselves with this teaching, in order to be able to give advice to their patients, and priests must spell out clearly and completely the Church's teaching on marriage. The encyclical acknowledges that "perhaps not everyone will easily accept this particular teaching", but that "it comes as no surprise to the church that she, no less than her Divine founder is destined to be a sign of contradiction." Noted is the duty of proclaiming the entire moral law, "both natural and evangelical." The encyclical also points out that the Roman Catholic Church cannot "declare lawful what is in fact unlawful", because she is concerned with "safeguarding the holiness of marriage, in order to guide married life to its full human and Christian perfection." This is to be the priority for his fellow bishops and priests and lay people. Paul VI predicted that future progress in social cultural and economic spheres would make marital and family life more joyful, provided God's design for the world was faithfully followed. The encyclical closes with an appeal to observe the natural laws of the most high God. "These laws must be wisely and lovingly observed."

== History ==
=== Origins ===
There had been a long-standing general Christian prohibition on contraception and abortion, with such Church Fathers as Clement of Alexandria and Saint Augustine condemning the practices. It was not until the 1930 Lambeth Conference that the Anglican Communion allowed for contraception in limited circumstances. Mainline Protestant denominations have since removed prohibitions against artificial contraception. In a partial reaction, Pope Pius XI wrote the encyclical Casti connubii (Of Chaste Wedlock) in 1930, reaffirming the Catholic Church's belief in various traditional Christian teachings on marriage and sexuality, including the prohibition of artificial birth control even within marriage. Casti connubii is against contraception and regarding natural family planning allowed married couples to use their nuptial rights "in the proper manner" when because of either time or defects, new life could not be brought forth.

=== The commission of John XXIII ===
With the appearance of the first oral contraceptives in 1960, dissenters in the Church argued for a reconsideration of the Church positions. In 1963 Pope John XXIII established a commission of six European non-theologians to study questions of birth control and population. It met once in 1963 and twice in 1964. As Vatican Council II was concluding, Pope Paul VI enlarged it to fifty-eight members, including married couples, laywomen, theologians and bishops. The last document issued by the council (Gaudium et spes) contained a section titled "Fostering the Nobility of Marriage" (1965, nos. 47–52), which discussed marriage from the personalist point of view. The "duty of responsible parenthood" was affirmed, but the determination of licit and illicit forms of regulating birth was reserved to Pope Paul VI. In the spring of 1966, following the close of the council, the commission held its fifth and final meeting, having been enlarged again to include sixteen bishops as an executive committee. The commission was only consultative but it submitted a report approved by a majority of 64 members to Paul VI. It proposed the approval of artificial contraception without distinction of the various means. A minority of four members opposed this report and issued a parallel report to the Pope. Arguments in the minority report, against change in the church's teaching, were that a loosening of contraception restrictions would mean the Catholic Church would "have to concede frankly that the Holy Spirit had been on the side of the Protestant churches in 1930" (when Casti connubii was promulgated), and that "it should likewise have to be admitted that for a half a century the Spirit failed to protect Pius XI, Pius XII, and a large part of the Catholic hierarchy from a very serious error."

After two more years of study and consultation, the pope issued Humanae vitae, which removed any doubt that the Church views hormonal anti-ovulants as contraceptive. He explained why he did not accept the opinion of the majority report of the commission (1968, #6). Arguments were raised in the decades that followed that his decision has never passed the condition of "reception" to become church doctrine.

=== Drafting of the encyclical ===
In his role as Theologian of the Pontifical Household, Mario Luigi Ciappi advised Pope Paul VI during the drafting of Humanae vitae. Ciappi, a doctoral graduate of the Pontificium Athenaeum Internationale Angelicum, the future Pontifical University of Saint Thomas Aquinas, Angelicum, served as professor of dogmatic theology there and was Dean of the Angelicum's Faculty of Theology from 1935 to 1955.

According to George Weigel, Paul VI named Archbishop Karol Wojtyła (later Pope John Paul II) to the commission, but Polish government authorities would not permit him to travel to Rome. Wojtyła had earlier defended the church's position from a philosophical standpoint in his 1960 book Love and Responsibility. Wojtyła's position was strongly considered and it was reflected in the final draft of the encyclical, although much of his language and arguments were not incorporated. Weigel attributes much of the poor reception of the encyclical to the omission of many of Wojtyła's arguments.

In 2017, anticipating the 50th anniversary of the encyclical, four theologians led by Mgr. Gilfredo Marengo, a professor of theological anthropology at the Pontifical John Paul II Institute for Studies on Marriage and Family, launched a research project he called "a work of historical-critical investigation without any aim other than reconstructing as well as possible the whole process of composing the encyclical". Using the resources of the Vatican Secret Archives and the Congregation for the Doctrine of the Faith, they hope to detail the writing process and the interaction between the commission, publicity surrounding the commission's work, and Paul's own authorship.

== Highlights ==
=== Faithfulness to God's design ===
13. Men rightly observe that a conjugal act imposed on one's partner without regard to his or her condition or personal and reasonable wishes in the matter, is no true act of love, and therefore offends the moral order in its particular application to the intimate relationship of husband and wife. If they further reflect, they must also recognize that an act of mutual love which impairs the capacity to transmit life which God the Creator, through specific laws, has built into it, frustrates His design which constitutes the norm of marriage, and contradicts the will of the Author of life. Hence to use this divine gift while depriving it, even if only partially, of its meaning and purpose, is equally repugnant to the nature of man and of woman, and is consequently in opposition to the plan of God and His holy will. But to experience the gift of married love while respecting the laws of conception is to acknowledge that one is not the master of the sources of life but rather the minister of the design established by the Creator. Just as man does not have unlimited dominion over his body in general, so also, and with more particular reason, he has no such dominion over his specifically sexual faculties, for these are concerned by their very nature with the generation of life, of which God is the source. "Human life is sacred—all men must recognize that fact," Our predecessor Pope John XXIII recalled. "From its very inception it reveals the creating hand of God."

—

=== Lawful therapeutic means ===
15. [...] the Church does not consider at all illicit the use of those therapeutic means necessary to cure bodily diseases, even if a foreseeable impediment to procreation should result therefrom — provided such impediment is not directly intended.

=== Recourse to infertile periods ===
16. [...] If therefore there are well-grounded reasons for spacing births, arising from the physical or psychological condition of husband or wife, or from external circumstances, the Church teaches that married people may then take advantage of the natural cycles immanent in the reproductive system and engage in marital intercourse only during those times that are infertile, thus controlling birth in a way which does not in the least offend the moral principles which We have just explained.

=== Concern of the Church ===
18. It is to be anticipated that perhaps not everyone will easily accept this particular teaching. There is too much clamorous outcry against the voice of the Church, and this is intensified by modern means of communication. But it comes as no surprise to the Church that it, no less than its divine Founder, is destined to be a "sign of contradiction." The Church does not, because of this, evade the duty imposed on it of proclaiming humbly but firmly the entire moral law, both natural and evangelical. Since the Church did not make either of these laws, it cannot be their arbiter—only their guardian and interpreter. It could never be right for the Church to declare lawful what is in fact unlawful, since that, by its very nature, is always opposed to the true good of man. In preserving intact the whole moral law of marriage, the Church is convinced that it is contributing to the creation of a truly human civilization. The Church urges man not to betray his personal responsibilities by putting all his faith in technical expedients. In this way it defends the dignity of husband and wife. This course of action shows that the Church, loyal to the example and teaching of the divine Savior, is sincere and unselfish in its regard for men whom it strives to help even now during this earthly pilgrimage "to share God's life as sons of the living God, the Father of all men".

=== Developing countries ===
23. We are fully aware of the difficulties confronting the public authorities in this matter, especially in the developing countries. In fact, We had in mind the justifiable anxieties which weigh upon them when We published Our encyclical letter Populorum Progressio. But now We join Our voice to that of Our predecessor John XXIII of venerable memory, and We make Our own his words: "No statement of the problem and no solution to it is acceptable which does violence to man's essential dignity; those who propose such solutions base them on an utterly materialistic conception of man himself and his life. The only possible solution to this question is one which envisages the social and economic progress both of individuals and of the whole of human society, and which respects and promotes true human values." No one can, without being grossly unfair, make divine Providence responsible for what clearly seems to be the result of misguided governmental policies, of an insufficient sense of social justice, of a selfish accumulation of material goods, and finally of a culpable failure to undertake those initiatives and responsibilities which would raise the standard of living of peoples and their children.

== Reception ==
=== Galileo affair comparison ===
Cardinal Leo Joseph Suenens, a moderator of the ecumenical council, questioned "whether moral theology took sufficient account of scientific progress, which can help determine, what is according to nature. I beg you my brothers let us avoid another Galileo affair. One is enough for the Church." In an interview in Informations Catholiques Internationales on 15 May 1969, he criticized the Pope's decision again as frustrating the collegiality defined by the council, calling it a non-collegial or even an anti-collegial act. He was supported by Vatican II theologians such as Karl Rahner, Hans Küng, several Episcopal conferences, e.g. the Episcopal Conference of Austria, Germany, and Switzerland, as well as several bishops, including Christopher Butler, who called it one of the most important contributions to contemporary discussion in the Church.

=== Open dissent ===
The publication of the encyclical marks the first time in the twentieth century that open dissent from the laity about teachings of the Church was voiced widely and publicly. The teaching has been criticized by development organizations and others who claim that it limits the methods available to fight worldwide population growth and struggle against HIV/AIDS. Within two days of the encyclical's release, a group of dissident theologians, led by Rev. Charles Curran, then Catholic University of America, issued a statement stating, "spouses may responsibly decide according to their conscience that artificial contraception in some circumstances is permissible and indeed necessary to preserve and foster the value and sacredness of marriage."

=== Dutch Catechism ===
The Dutch Catechism of 1966, based on the Dutch bishops' interpretation of the just completed Vatican Council, and the first post-Council comprehensive Catholic catechism, noted the lack of mention of artificial contraception in the council. "As everyone can ascertain nowadays, there are several methods of regulating births. The Second Vatican Council did not speak of any of these concrete methods [...] This is a different standpoint than that taken under Pius XI some thirty years ago which was also maintained by his successor [...] we can sense here a clear development in the Church, a development, which is also going on outside the Church."

=== Ecumenical reactions ===
Ecumenical reactions were mixed. Liberal and Moderate Lutherans and the World Council of Churches were disappointed. Eugene Carson Blake criticised the concepts of nature and natural law, which, in his view, still dominated Catholic theology, as outdated. This concern dominated several articles in Catholic and non-Catholic journals at the time. Patriarch Athenagoras I stated his full agreement with Pope Paul VI: "He could not have spoken in any other way."

=== Responses by region ===
==== Canada ====
Two months later, the controversial Winnipeg Statement issued by the Canadian Conference of Catholic Bishops stated that those who cannot accept the teaching should not be considered shut off from the Catholic Church, and that individuals can in good conscience use contraception as long as they have first made an honest attempt to accept the difficult directives of the encyclical.

==== Soviet Union ====
In the Soviet Union, Literaturnaya Gazeta, a publication of Soviet intellectuals, included an editorial and statement by Russian physicians against the encyclical.

==== Latin America ====
In Latin America, much support developed for the Pope and his encyclical. As World Bank President Robert McNamara declared at the 1968 Annual Meeting of the International Monetary Fund and the World Bank Group that countries permitting birth control practices will get preferential access to resources, doctors in La Paz, Bolivia, called it insulting that money should be exchanged for the conscience of a Catholic nation. In Colombia, Cardinal Aníbal Muñoz Duque declared, "if American conditionality undermines Papal teachings, we prefer not to receive one cent". The Senate of Bolivia passed a resolution, stating that Humanae vitae can be discussed in its implications on individual consciences, but is of greatest significance because it defends the rights of developing nations to determine their own population policies. The Jesuit Journal Sic dedicated one edition to the encyclical with supportive contributions. However, against eighteen insubordinate priests, professors of theology at Pontifical Catholic University of Chile, and the ensuing conspiracy of silence practiced by the Chilean Episcopate, which had to be censured by the Nuncio in Santiago at the behest of Cardinal Gabriel-Marie Garrone, prefect of the Congregation for Catholic Education, triggering eventually a media conflict with El Diario Ilustrado, Plinio Corrêa de Oliveira expressed his affliction with the lamentations of Jeremiah: "O ye all that pass through the way…" (Lamentations 1:12, King James Bible).

=== Responses by individuals ===
==== Cardinal Martini ====
In the book "Nighttime conversations in Jerusalem. On the risk of faith.", well-known liberal Cardinal Carlo Maria Martini accused Paul VI of deliberately concealing the truth, leaving it to theologians and pastors to fix things by adapting precepts to practice: "I knew Paul VI well. With the encyclical, he wanted to express consideration for human life. He explained his intention to some of his friends by using a comparison: although one must not lie, sometimes it is not possible to do otherwise; it may be necessary to conceal the truth, or it may be unavoidable to tell a lie. It is up to the moralists to explain where sin begins, especially in the cases in which there is a higher duty than the transmission of life."

==== Karol Wojtyła ====
The future Pope John Paul II (at the time Archbishop of Krakow Karol Wojtyła) asked Paul VI to apply papal infallibility in docendo (in teaching) to the encyclical, equating it with the authority of a dogma. Paul VI and John XXIII did not. Wojtyła himself declared the encyclical part of the ordinary and universal magisterium of the Roman Catholic Church.

==== Pope Paul VI ====
Pope Paul VI was troubled by the encyclical's reception in the West. Acknowledging the controversy, Paul VI in a letter to the Congress of German Catholics (30 August 1968), stated: "May the lively debate aroused by our encyclical lead to a better knowledge of God's will." In March 1969, he had a meeting with one of the main critics of Humanae vitae, Cardinal Leo Joseph Suenens. Paul heard him out and said merely, "Yes, pray for me; because of my weaknesses, the Church is badly governed." To jog the memory of his critics, he also put in their minds the experience of no less a figure than Peter: "[n]ow I understand St Peter: he came to Rome twice, the second time to be crucified", – herewith directing their attention to his rejoicing in glorifying the Lord. Increasingly convinced, that "the smoke of Satan entered the temple of God from some fissure", Paul VI reaffirmed, on 23 June 1978, weeks before his death, in an address to the College of Cardinals, his Humanae vitae: "following the confirmations of serious science", and which sought to affirm the principle of respect for the laws of nature and of "a conscious and ethically responsible paternity".

==== Padre Pio ====
In his last letter to Pope Paul VI, Christian mystic and canonized saint Padre Pio called Humanae vitae "clear and decisive words".

== Legacy ==
Polls have shown that many self-identified Catholics use artificial means of contraception, and that very few use natural family planning. However, John L. Allen Jr. wrote in 2008: "Three decades of bishops' appointments by John Paul II and Benedict XVI, both unambiguously committed to Humanae Vitae, mean that senior leaders in Catholicism these days are far less inclined than they were in 1968 to distance themselves from the ban on birth control, or to soft-pedal it. Some Catholic bishops have brought out documents of their own defending Humanae Vitae." Developments in fertility awareness since the 1960s have also given rise to natural family planning organizations such as the Billings Ovulation Method, Couple to Couple League and the Creighton Model FertilityCare System, which actively provide formal instruction on the use and reliability of natural methods of birth control.

=== Pope John Paul I ===
John Paul the First's views on Humanae vitae have been debated. Journalist John L. Allen Jr. claims that "it's virtually certain that John Paul I would not have reversed Paul VI's teaching, particularly since he was no doctrinal radical. Moreover, as Patriarch in Venice some had seen a hardening of his stance on social issues as the years went by." According to Allen, "it is reasonable to assume that John Paul I would not have insisted upon the negative judgment in Humanae Vitae as aggressively and publicly as John Paul II did, and probably would not have treated it as a quasi-infallible teaching. It would have remained a more 'open' question". Other sources take a different view and note that during his time as Patriarch of Venice that "Luciani was intransigent with his upholding of the teaching of the Church and severe with those, through intellectual pride and disobedience paid no attention to the Church's prohibition of contraception", though while not condoning the sin, he was tolerant of those who sincerely tried and failed to live up to the Church's teaching. Raymond and Lauretta's book The Smiling Pope, The Life & Teaching of John Paul I states that "if some people think that his compassion and gentleness in this respect implies he was against Humanae Vitae one can only infer it was wishful thinking on their part and an attempt to find an ally in favor of artificial contraception."

=== Pope John Paul II ===
After he became pope in 1978, John Paul II continued on the Catholic Theology of the Body of his predecessors with a series of lectures, entitled Theology of the Body, in which he talked about an "original unity between man and women", purity of heart (on the Sermon on the Mount), marriage and celibacy and reflections on Humanae vitae, focusing largely on responsible parenthood and marital chastity.

In 1981, the Pope's Apostolic exhortation, Familiaris consortio, restated the Church's opposition to artificial birth control stated previously in Humanae vitae.

John Paul II readdressed some of the same issues in his 1993 encyclical Veritatis splendor. He reaffirmed much of Humanae vitae, and specifically described the practice of artificial contraception as an act not permitted by Catholic teaching in any circumstances. The same encyclical also clarifies the use of conscience in arriving at moral decisions, including in the use of contraception. However, John Paul also said, "It is not right then to regard the moral conscience of the individual and the magisterium of the Church as two contenders, as two realities in conflict. The authority which the magisterium enjoys by the will of Christ exists so that the moral conscience can attain the truth with security and remain in it." John Paul quoted Humanae vitae as a compassionate encyclical, "Christ has come not to judge the world but to save it, and while he was uncompromisingly stern towards sin, he was patient and rich in mercy towards sinners".

Pope John Paul's 1995 encyclical Evangelium vitae ('The Gospel of Life') affirmed the Church's position on contraception and multiple topics related to the culture of life.

=== Pope Benedict XVI ===
On 12 May 2008, Benedict XVI accepted an invitation to talk to participants in the International Congress organized by the Pontifical Lateran University on the 40th anniversary of Humanae vitae. He put the encyclical in the broader view of love in a global context, a topic he called "so controversial, yet so crucial for humanity's future." Humanae vitae became "a sign of contradiction but also of continuity of the Church's doctrine and tradition... What was true yesterday is true also today." The Church continues to reflect "in an ever new and deeper way on the fundamental principles that concern marriage and procreation." The key message of Humanae vitae is love. Benedict states, that the fullness of a person is achieved by a unity of soul and body, but neither spirit nor body alone can love, only the two together. If this unity is broken, if only the body is satisfied, love becomes a commodity.

=== Pope Francis ===
On 16 January 2015, Pope Francis said to a meeting with families in Manila, insisting on the need to protect the family: "The family is [...] threatened by growing efforts on the part of some to redefine the very institution of marriage, by relativism, by the culture of the ephemeral, by a lack of openness to life. I think of Blessed Paul VI. At a time when the problem of population growth was being raised, he had the courage to defend openness to life in families. He knew the difficulties that are there in every family, and so in his Encyclical he was very merciful towards particular cases, and he asked confessors to be very merciful and understanding in dealing with particular cases. But he also had a broader vision: he looked at the peoples of the earth and he saw this threat of the destruction of the family through the privation of children [original Spanish: destrucción de la familia por la privación de los hijos]. Paul VI was courageous; he was a good pastor and he warned his flock of the wolves who were coming."

A year before, on 1 May 2014, Pope Francis, in an interview given to Italian newspaper Corriere della Sera, expressed his opinion and praise for Humanae vitae: "Everything depends on how Humanae vitae is interpreted. Paul VI himself, in the end, urged confessors to be very merciful and pay attention to concrete situations. But his genius was prophetic, he had the courage to take a stand against the majority, to defend moral discipline, to exercise a cultural restraint, to oppose present and future neo-Malthusianism. The question is not of changing doctrine, but of digging deep and making sure that pastoral care takes into account situations and what it is possible for persons to do."
