= Billings ovulation method =

Fertility awareness method

Background
- Type: Behavioral
- First use: developed in 1950s

Failure rates (first year)
- Perfect use: 0.5–3%
- Typical use: 1–22%

Usage
- Reversibility: immediate
- User reminders: Accurate teaching and daily charting are essential.
- Clinic review: None

Advantages and disadvantages
- STI protection: No
- Period advantages: Prediction
- Weight gain: No
- Benefits: Low cost, no prerequisites for use, no side effects, can aid pregnancy achievement
- Risks: Effectiveness is unclear

The Billings ovulation method is a method in which women use their vaginal mucus to determine their fertility. It does not rely on the presence of ovulation, but identifies patterns of potential and obvious infertility within the cycle. Its effectiveness is not very clear.

== Evidence ==
Typical use of this method is associated with a pregnancy rate of 1–22%. A World Health Organization study found that 15% is caused by a conscious departure from method rules. The percentage of people who stop using the method after a year is 1–24%. Perfect use has been estimated to result in pregnancy in 0.5–3%. Some studies of perfect use excluded those who could not detect secretions that represented fertility.

== Fertility ==
An observation chart

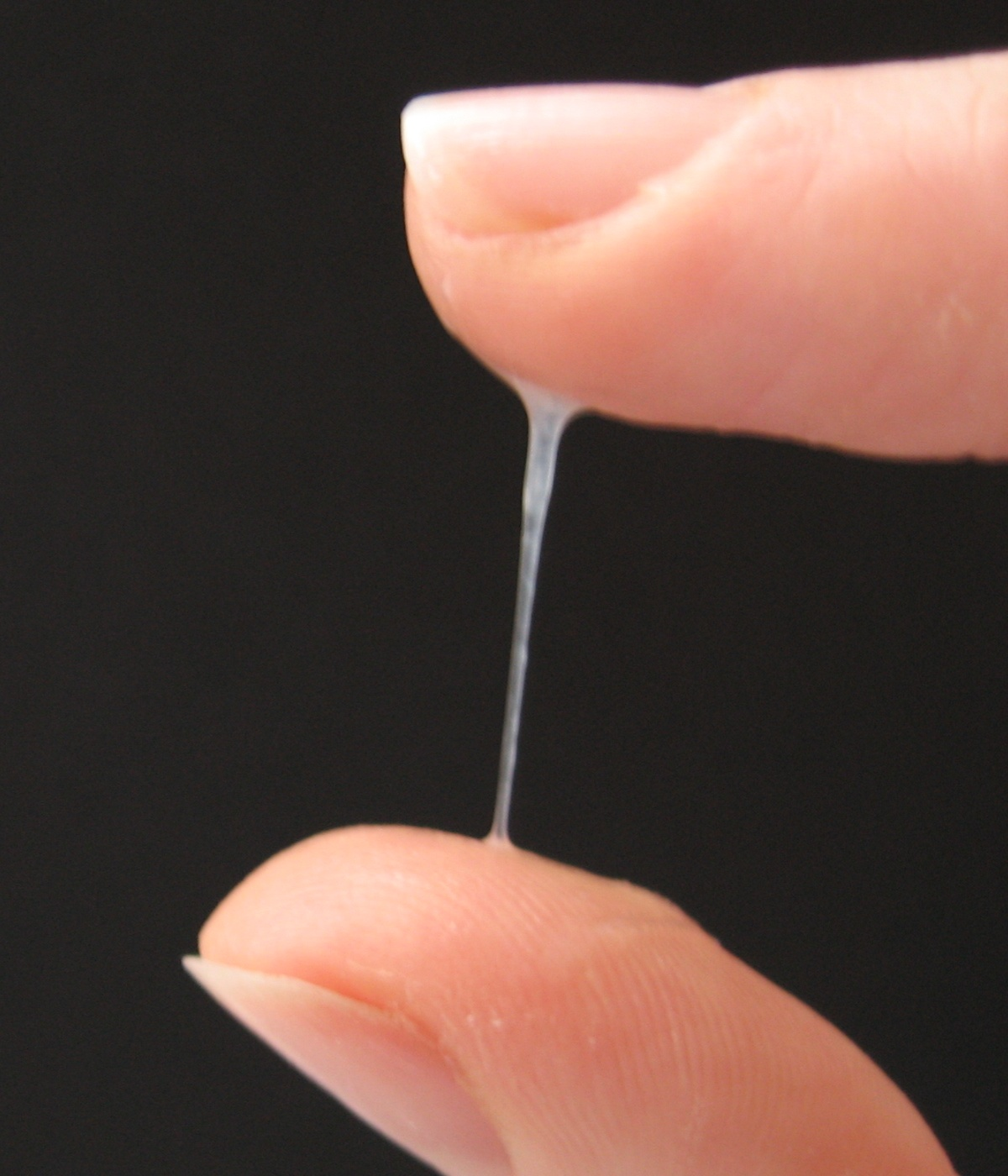
Cervical mucus

- A woman typically ovulates at only one time during her cycle (except those with hyperovulation), and an unfertilized ovum can survive for only 12–24 hours.
- Cervical mucus enabling healthy sperm cells to navigate the genital tract is necessary for fertility.
- Most commonly, spermatozoa live only one to three days in the presence of fertile mucus, with survival up to five days being rare. The possibility of pregnancy from sperm survival longer than five days has been compared to "the chances of winning a huge lottery."
- Menstruation will occur about 2 weeks after ovulation.
- A ten-year study of 45,280 subfertile couples in China found that 32.1% of women were able to achieve pregnancy and live birth through the use of Billings.

== Function ==
In the days leading up to ovulation, the cervix responds to estrogen by producing mucus capable of sustaining sperm survival. This mucus leaves the vagina as the woman is in an upright position. The mucus is observed through the sensation at the vulva and by looking at any cervical secretions. Daily charting of these observations will reveal either an unchanging pattern indicating infertility or a changing pattern of sensation and discharge indicating fertility. Both of these patterns follow the hormonal patterns which control sperm survival and conception.

== History ==
The first recorded observations of the relationship between cervical mucus and survival of spermatozoa come from the mid-19th century. The topic was not systematically studied, however, for almost another century. In 1948, Erik Odeblad was studying mycoplasms in the female genital tract. During the course of his studies, he noticed that cervical mucus changed in a predictable pattern through the course of a woman's cycle. He continued his study of the cervix.

John Billings (1918–2007) was involved with the development of the Billings ovulation method.
