= Human body temperature =

Typical temperature range found in humans

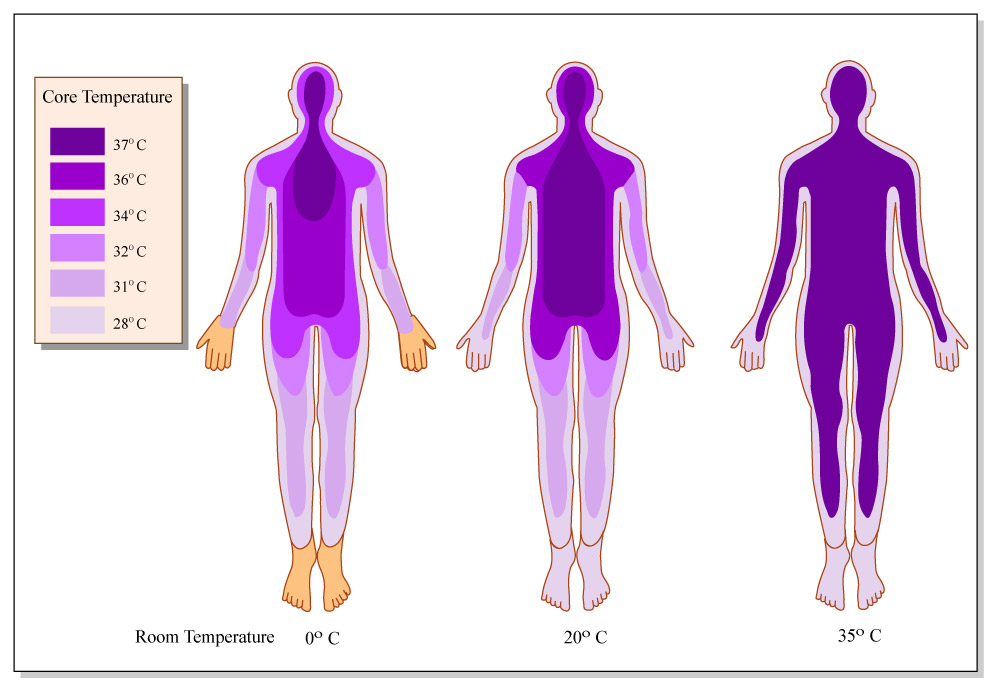
Human body temperature at a variety of room temperatures.

Normal human body temperature (normothermia, euthermia) is the typical temperature range found in humans, generally given as 36.5–37.5 °C (97.7–99.5 °F).

Human body temperature varies. It depends on sex, age, time of day, exertion level, health status (such as illness and menstruation), what part of the body the measurement is taken at, state of consciousness (waking, sleeping, sedated), and emotions. Body temperature is kept in the normal range by a homeostatic function known as thermoregulation, in which adjustment of temperature is triggered by the central nervous system.

== Methods of measurement ==
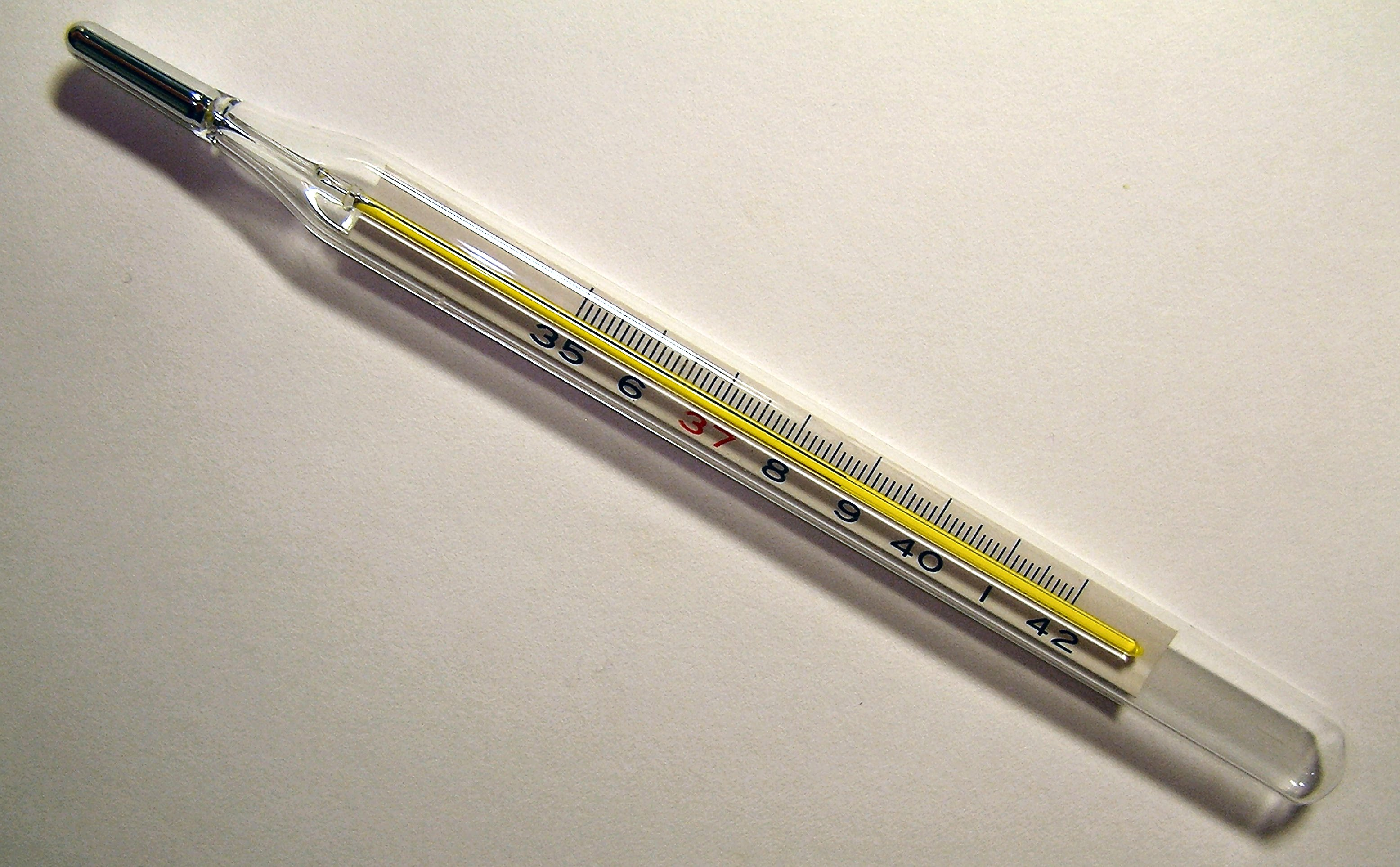
A medical thermometer showing a temperature reading of 38.7 °C (101.7 °F)

Taking a temperature is an initial part of a full clinical examination. There are various types of medical thermometers, as well as sites used for measurement, including:

- Under the armpit (axillary temperature)
- In the mouth (oral temperature)
- In the rectum (rectal temperature)
- In the ear (tympanic temperature)
- On the skin of the forehead over the temporal artery
- Using heat flux sensors

=== Variation ===
Diurnal variation in body temperature, ranging from about 37.5 °C (99.5 °F) from 10 a.m. to 6 p.m., and falling to about 36.4 °C (97.5 °F) from 2 a.m. to 6 a.m. (Based on figure in entry for 'Animal Heat' in 11th edition of the Encyclopædia Britannica, 1910)

Temperature control (thermoregulation) is a homeostatic mechanism that keeps the organism at optimum operating temperature, as the temperature affects the rate of chemical reactions. In humans, the average internal temperature is widely cited as 37 °C (98.6 °F), a "normal" temperature established in the 1800s. Newer studies show that average internal temperature for men and women is 36.4 °C (97.5 °F). Temperatures cycle regularly through the day, as controlled by the person's circadian rhythm. The lowest temperature occurs about two hours before the person normally wakes up. Temperatures also change according to activities and external factors.

Normal body temperature may also differ as much as 0.5 °C (0.90 °F) from one day to the next.

Normal human body temperature varies slightly from person to person and by the time of day. Consequently, each type of measurement has a range of normal temperatures. The range for normal human body temperatures, taken orally, is 36.8 ± 0.5 °C (98.2 ± 0.9 °F). This means that any oral temperature between 36.3 and 37.3 °C (97.3 and 99.1 °F) is likely to be normal.

The normal human body temperature is often stated as 36.5–37.5 °C (97.7–99.5 °F). In adults a review of the literature has found a wider range of 33.2–38.2 °C (91.8–100.8 °F) for normal temperatures, depending on the gender and location measured.

Reported values vary depending on how it is measured: oral (under the tongue): 36.8 ± 0.4 °C (98.2 ± 0.7 °F), internal (rectal, vaginal): 37.0 °C (98.6 °F). A rectal or vaginal measurement taken directly inside the body cavity is typically slightly higher than oral measurement, and oral measurement is somewhat higher than skin measurement. Other places, such as under the arm or in the ear, produce different typical temperatures. While some people think of these averages as representing normal or ideal measurements, a wide range of temperatures has been found in healthy people. The body temperature of a healthy person varies during the day by about 0.5 °C (0.9 °F) with lower temperatures in the morning and higher temperatures in the late afternoon and evening, as the body's needs and activities change. Other circumstances also affect the body's temperature. The core body temperature of an individual tends to have the lowest value in the second half of the sleep cycle; the lowest point, called the nadir, is one of the primary markers for circadian rhythms. The body temperature also changes when a person is hungry, sleepy, sick, or cold.

=== Natural rhythms ===
Body temperature normally fluctuates over the day following circadian rhythms, with the lowest levels around 4 a.m. and the highest in the late afternoon, between 4:00 and 6:00 p.m. (assuming the person sleeps at night and stays awake during the day). Therefore, an oral temperature of 37.3 °C (99.1 °F) would, strictly speaking, be a normal, healthy temperature in the afternoon but not in the early morning. An individual's body temperature typically changes by about 0.5 °C (0.9 °F) between its highest and lowest points each day.

Body temperature is sensitive to many hormones, so women have a temperature rhythm that varies with the menstrual cycle, called a circamensal rhythm. A woman's basal body temperature rises sharply after ovulation, as estrogen production decreases and progesterone increases. Fertility awareness programs use this change to identify when a woman has ovulated to achieve or avoid pregnancy. During the luteal phase of the menstrual cycle, both the lowest and the average temperatures are slightly higher than during other parts of the cycle. However, the amount that the temperature rises during each day is slightly lower than typical, so the highest temperature of the day is not very much higher than usual. Hormonal contraceptives both suppress the circamensal rhythm and raise the typical body temperature by about 0.6 °C (1.1 °F).

Temperature also may vary with the change of seasons during each year. This pattern is called a circannual rhythm. Studies of seasonal variations have produced inconsistent results. People living in different climates may have different seasonal patterns.

It has been found that physically active individuals have larger changes in body temperature throughout the day. Physically active people have been reported to have lower body temperatures than their less active peers in the early morning and similar or higher body temperatures later in the day.

With increased age, both average body temperature and the amount of daily variability in the body temperature tend to decrease. Elderly people may have a decreased ability to generate body heat during a fever, so even a somewhat elevated temperature can indicate a serious underlying cause in geriatrics. One study suggested that the average body temperature has also decreased since the 1850s. The study's authors believe the most likely explanation for the change is a reduction in inflammation at the population level due to decreased chronic infections and improved hygiene.

=== Measurement methods ===
Temperature by measurement technique
| Method | Women | Men |
|---|---|---|
| Oral | 33.2–38.1 °C (91.8–100.6 °F) | 35.7–37.7 °C (96.3–99.9 °F) |
| Rectal | 36.8–37.1 °C (98.2–98.8 °F) | 36.7–37.5 °C (98.1–99.5 °F) |
| Tympanic | 35.7–37.5 °C (96.3–99.5 °F) | 35.5–37.5 °C (95.9–99.5 °F) |
| Axillary | 35.5–37.0 °C (95.9–98.6 °F) | |

Different methods used for measuring temperature produce different results. The temperature reading depends on which part of the body is being measured. The typical daytime temperatures among healthy adults are as follows:

- Temperature in the rectum (rectal), vagina, or in the ear (tympanic) is about 37.5 °C (99.5 °F)
- Temperature in the mouth (oral) is about 36.8 °C (98.2 °F)
- Temperature under the arm (axillary) is about 36.5 °C (97.7 °F)

Generally, oral, rectal, gut, and core body temperatures, although slightly different, are well-correlated.

Oral temperatures are influenced by drinking, chewing, smoking, and breathing with the mouth open. Mouth breathing, cold drinks or food reduce oral temperatures; hot drinks, hot food, chewing, and smoking raise oral temperatures.

Each measurement method also has different normal ranges depending on sex.

=== Infrared thermometer ===
As of 2016, reviews of infrared thermometers have found them to be of variable accuracy. This includes tympanic infrared thermometers in children.

=== Variations due to outside factors ===
Sleep disturbances also affect temperatures. Normally, body temperature drops significantly at a person's normal bedtime and throughout the night. Short-term sleep deprivation produces a higher temperature at night than normal, but long-term sleep deprivation appears to reduce temperatures. Insomnia and poor sleep quality are associated with smaller and later drops in body temperature. Similarly, waking up unusually early, sleeping in, jet lag and changes to shift work schedules may affect body temperature.

== Concept ==
=== Fever ===
A temperature setpoint is the level at which the body attempts to maintain its temperature. When the setpoint is raised, the result is a fever. Most fevers are caused by infectious disease and can be lowered, if desired, with antipyretic medications.

An early morning temperature higher than 37.3 °C (99.1 °F) or a late afternoon temperature higher than 37.7 °C (99.9 °F) is normally considered a fever, assuming that the temperature is elevated due to a change in the hypothalamus's setpoint. Lower thresholds are sometimes appropriate for elderly people. The normal daily temperature variation is typically 0.5 °C (0.90 °F), but can be greater among people recovering from a fever.

An organism at optimum temperature is considered afebrile, meaning "without fever". If temperature is raised, but the setpoint is not raised, then the result is hyperthermia.

=== Hyperthermia ===
Hyperthermia occurs when the body produces or absorbs more heat than it can dissipate. It is usually caused by prolonged exposure to high temperatures. The heat-regulating mechanisms of the body eventually become overwhelmed and unable to deal effectively with the heat, causing the body temperature to climb uncontrollably. Hyperthermia at or above about 40 °C (104 °F) is a life-threatening medical emergency that requires immediate treatment. Common symptoms include headache, confusion, and fatigue. If sweating has resulted in dehydration, then the affected person may have dry, red skin.

In a medical setting, mild hyperthermia is commonly called heat exhaustion or heat prostration; severe hyperthermia is called heat stroke. Heatstroke may come on suddenly, but it usually follows the untreated milder stages. Treatment involves cooling and rehydrating the body; fever-reducing drugs are useless for this condition. This may be done by moving out of direct sunlight to a cooler and shaded environment, drinking water, removing clothing that might keep heat close to the body, or sitting in front of a fan. Bathing in tepid or cool water, or even just washing the face and other exposed areas of the skin, can be helpful.

With fever, the body's core temperature rises to a higher temperature through the action of the part of the brain that controls the body temperature; with hyperthermia, the body temperature is raised without the influence of the heat control centers.

=== Hypothermia ===
In hypothermia, body temperature drops below that required for normal metabolism and bodily functions. In humans, this is usually due to excessive exposure to cold air or water, but it can be deliberately induced as a medical treatment. Symptoms usually appear when the body's core temperature drops by 1–2 °C (1.8–3.6 °F) below normal temperature.

=== Basal body temperature ===
Basal body temperature is the lowest temperature attained by the body during rest (usually during sleep). It is generally measured immediately after awakening and before any physical activity has been undertaken, although the temperature measured at that time is somewhat higher than the true basal body temperature. In women, temperature differs at various points in the menstrual cycle, and this can be used in the long term to track ovulation both to aid conception or avoid pregnancy. This process is called fertility awareness.

=== Core temperature ===
Core temperature, also called core body temperature, is the operating temperature of an organism, specifically in deep structures of the body such as the liver, in comparison to temperatures of peripheral tissues. Core temperature is normally maintained within a narrow range so that essential enzymatic reactions can occur. Significant core temperature elevation (hyperthermia) or depression (hypothermia) over more than a brief period of time is fatal.

Temperature examination in the heart, using a catheter, is the traditional gold standard measurement used to estimate core temperature (oral temperature is affected by hot or cold drinks, ambient temperature fluctuations as well as mouth-breathing). Since catheters are highly invasive, the generally accepted alternative for measuring core body temperature is through rectal measurements. Rectal temperature is expected to be approximately 1 °F (0.56 °C) higher than an oral temperature taken on the same person at the same time. Ear thermometers measure temperature from the tympanic membrane using infrared sensors and also aim to measure core body temperature, since the blood supply of this membrane is directly shared with the brain. However, this method of measuring body temperature is not as accurate as rectal measurement and has a low sensitivity for fever, failing to determine three or four out of every ten fever measurements in children. Ear temperature measurement may be acceptable for observing trends in body temperature but is less useful in consistently identifying and diagnosing fever.

Until recently, direct measurement of core body temperature required either an ingestible device or surgical insertion of a probe. Therefore, a variety of indirect methods have commonly been used as the preferred alternative to these more accurate albeit more invasive methods. The rectal or vaginal temperature is generally considered to give the most accurate assessment of core body temperature, particularly in hypothermia. In the early 2000s, ingestible thermistors in capsule form were produced, allowing the temperature inside the digestive tract to be transmitted to an external receiver; one study found that these were comparable in accuracy to rectal temperature measurement. More recently, a new method using heat flux sensors have been developed. Several research papers show that its accuracy is similar to the invasive methods.

=== Internal variation ===
Measurement within the body finds internal variation temperatures as different as 21.5 °C (70.7 °F) for the radial artery and 31.1 °C (88.0 °F) for the brachial artery. It has been observed that "chaos" has been "introduced into physiology by the fictitious assumption of a constant blood temperature".

== Temperature variation ==
=== Hot ===
- 44 °C (111.2 °F) or more – Almost certainly death will occur; however, people have been known to survive up to 46.5 °C (115.7 °F).
- 43 °C (109.4 °F) – Normally death, or there may be serious brain damage, convulsions, and shock. Cardio-respiratory collapse will likely occur.
- 42 °C (107.6 °F) – Subject may turn red. They may become comatose, be in severe delirium, and convulsions can occur.
- 41 °C (105.8 °F) – (Medical emergency) – Fainting, severe headache, dizziness, confusion, hallucinations, delirium, and drowsiness can occur. There may also be palpitations and breathlessness.
- 40 °C (104 °F) – Fainting, dehydration, weakness, headache, breathlessness, and dizziness may occur as well as profuse sweating.
- 39 °C (102.2 °F) – Severe sweating, and red. Fast heart rate and breathlessness. There may be exhaustion accompanying this. Children and people with epilepsy may suffer convulsions at this temperature.
- 38 °C (100.4 °F) – (Classed as hyperthermia if not caused by a fever) – Feeling hot, sweating, feeling thirsty, feeling very uncomfortable.
- 37.6 °C (99.7 °F) — Classed as a slight fever. May lose appetite, feeling hot, feeling uncomfortable, feeling thirsty.

=== Normal ===
- 36.5–37.5 °C (97.7–99.5 °F) is a typically reported range for normal body temperature.

=== Cold ===
- 35.5 °C (95.9 °F) – Feeling cold, mild to moderate shivering. This can be a normal body temperature for sleeping.
- 35 °C (95 °F) – Threshold for hypothermia. Intense shivering, numbness and bluish/grayness of the skin. There is the possibility of heart irritability.
- 34 °C (93.2 °F) – Severe shivering, loss of movement of fingers, blueness, and confusion. Some behavioral changes may take place.
- 33 °C (91.4 °F) – Moderate to severe confusion, sleepiness, depressed reflexes, progressive loss of shivering, slow heartbeat, shallow breathing. Shivering may stop. The subject may be unresponsive to certain stimuli.
- 32 °C (89.6 °F) – (Medical emergency) – Hallucinations, delirium, complete confusion, extreme sleepiness that is progressively becoming comatose. Shivering is absent. Reflex may be absent or very slight.
- 31 °C (87.8 °F) – Comatose, very rarely conscious. No or slight reflexes. Very shallow breathing and slow heart rate. Possibility of serious heart rhythm problems.
- 28 °C (82.4 °F) – Severe heart rhythm disturbances are likely and breathing may stop at any time. The person may appear to be dead.
- 24–26 °C (75.2–78.8 °F) or less – Death usually occurs due to irregular heart beat or respiratory arrest; however, some patients have been known to survive with body temperatures lower than 12.7 °C (54.9 °F). The lowest recorded core temperature from a patient with accidental hypothermia who survived without neurological sequelae is 11.8 °C (53.2 °F).

There are non-verbal corporal cues that can hint at an individual experiencing a low body temperature, which can be used for those with dysphasia or infants. Examples of non-verbal cues of coldness include stillness and being lethargic, unusual paleness of skin among light-skinned people, and, among males, shrinkage, and contraction of the scrotum.

== Effect of environment ==
Environmental conditions, primarily temperature and humidity, affect the ability of the mammalian body to thermoregulate. The psychrometric temperature, of which the wet-bulb temperature is the main component, largely limits thermoregulation. It was thought that a wet-bulb temperature of about 35 °C (95 °F) was the highest sustained value consistent with human life.

A 2022 study on the effect of heat on young people found that the critical wet-bulb temperature at which heat stress can no longer be compensated, T_{wb,crit}, in young, healthy adults performing tasks at modest metabolic rates mimicking basic activities of daily life was much lower than the 35 °C (95 °F) usually assumed, at about 30.55 °C (86.99 °F) in 36–40 °C (97–104 °F) humid environments, but progressively decreased in hotter, dry ambient environments.

At low temperatures the body thermoregulates by generating heat, but this becomes unsustainable at extremely low temperatures.

== Historical understanding ==
In the 19th century, most books quoted "blood heat" as 98 °F, until a study published the mean (but not the variance) of a large sample as 36.88 °C (98.38 °F). Subsequently, that mean was widely quoted as "37 °C or 98.4 °F" until editors realized 37 °C is equal to 98.6 °F, not 98.4 °F. The 37 °C value was set by German physician Carl Reinhold August Wunderlich in his 1868 book, which put temperature charts into widespread clinical use. Dictionaries and other sources that quoted these averages did add the word "about" to show that there is some variance, but generally did not state how wide the variance is.
