= Anovulation =

Failure to ovulate during a menstrual cycle

- Specialty: Gynecology

Anovulation is when the ovaries do not release an oocyte during a menstrual cycle. Therefore, ovulation does not take place. However, a woman who does not ovulate at each menstrual cycle is not necessarily going through menopause. Chronic anovulation is a common cause of infertility.

In addition to the alteration of menstrual periods and infertility, chronic anovulation can cause or exacerbate other long-term problems, such as hyperandrogenism or osteopenia. It plays a central role in the multiple imbalances and dysfunctions of polyendocrine metabolic ovarian syndrome (PMOS).

During the first two years after menarche 50% of the menstrual cycles could be anovulatory cycles.

It is possible to restore ovulation using appropriate medication, and ovulation is successfully restored in approximately 90% of cases. The first step is the diagnosis of anovulation. The identification of anovulation is not easy; contrary to what is commonly believed, women undergoing anovulation still have (more or less) regular periods. In general, women only notice that there is a problem once they have started trying to conceive.

Temperature charting is a useful way of providing early clues about anovulation, and can help gynaecologists in their diagnosis.

== Signs and symptoms ==
Anovulation is usually associated with specific symptoms. They are not necessarily all displayed simultaneously. Amenorrhea (absence of menstruation) occurs in about 20% of women with ovulatory dysfunction. Infrequent and light menstruation occurs in about 40% of women with ovulatory dysfunction. Another potential symptom is irregular menstruation, where five or more menstrual cycles a year are five or more days shorter or longer than the length of the average cycle. Absence of mastodynia (breast pain or tenderness) occurs in about 20% of women with ovulatory problems. Also possible is increased body mass and facial hair, which is relatively easy to treat, and is often associated with polyendocrine metabolic ovarian syndrome (PMOS).

=== Associated conditions ===
For most women, alteration of menstrual periods is the principal indication of chronic anovulation. Ovulatory menstrual periods tend to be regular and predictable in terms of cycle length, duration and heaviness of bleeding, and other symptoms. Ovulatory periods are often accompanied by midcycle symptoms such as mittelschmerz or premenstrual symptoms. In contrast, anovulation usually manifests itself as irregularity of menstrual periods, that is, unpredictable variability of intervals, duration, or bleeding. Anovulation can also cause cessation of periods (secondary amenorrhea) or excessive bleeding (dysfunctional uterine bleeding). Mittelschmerz and premenstrual symptoms tend to be absent or reduced when a woman is anovulatory.

== Causes ==
Hormonal imbalance is the most common cause of anovulation and is thought to account for about 70% of all cases. About half the women with hormonal imbalances do not produce enough follicles to ensure the development of an ovule, possibly due to poor hormonal secretions from the pituitary gland or the hypothalamus. The pituitary gland controls most other hormonal glands in the human body. Therefore, any pituitary malfunctioning affects other glands under its influence, including the ovaries. This occurs in around 10% of cases. The pituitary gland is controlled by the hypothalamus. In 10% of cases, alterations in the chemical signals from the hypothalamus can easily seriously affect the ovaries. There are other hormonal anomalies with no direct link to the ones mentioned above that can affect ovulation. For instance, women with hyper- or hypothyroidism sometimes have ovulation problems. Thyroid dysfunction can halt ovulation by upsetting the balance of the body's natural reproductive hormones.

Currently, the four main causes of ovulatory disorders are polyendocrine metabolic ovarian syndrome (PMOS), hypogonadotropic hypogonadism (HA), primary ovarian insufficiency (POI), and hyperprolactinemia.

=== Polyendocrine metabolic ovarian syndrome ===
Women with PMOS make up the greatest portion of anovulatory women in clinical practice. The criteria for a PMOS diagnosis is referred to as the Rotterdam criteria and consists of:

1. oligoovulation and/or anovulation
2. excess androgen activity
3. polycystic ovaries (by gynecologic ultrasound)

=== Hypogonadotropic hypogonadism ===
Hypothalamic causes of hypogonadotropic hypogonadism (HA) include functional hypothalamic amenorrhea (FHA) and isolated gonadotropin-releasing hormone (GnRH) deficiency. Laboratory findings of low serum estradiol and low FSH are associated with the decrease in hypothalamic secretion of GnRH.

A rare form of HA that presents as primary amenorrhea can be due to a congenital deficiency of GnRH knows as idiopathic hypogonadotropic hypogonadism or, Kallmann syndrome if it is associated with anosmia. Infiltrative disease or tumors affecting the hypothalamus and pituitary can result in HA.

FHA accounts for around 10–15% of all cases of anovulation. Weight loss or anorexia can lead to FHA by causing a hormonal imbalance, leading to irregular ovulation (dysovulation). It is possible that this mechanism evolved to protect the mother's health. A pregnancy where the mother is weak could pose a risk to the baby's and mother's health. On the other hand, excess weight can also create ovarian dysfunctions. Dr Barbieri of Harvard Medical School has indicated that cases of anovulation are quite frequent in women with a BMI (body mass index) over 27 kg/m2.

=== Primary ovarian insufficiency ===
POI was previously referred to as premature ovarian failure (POF) and diagnosed when menopause occurred before age 40 but occurs in only 1 percent of all women. The ovaries can stop working in about 5% of cases. This may be because the ovaries do not contain eggs. However, a complete blockage of the ovaries is rarely a cause of infertility. Blocked ovaries can start functioning again without a clear medical explanation. In some cases, the egg may have matured properly, but the follicle may have failed to burst (or the follicle may have burst without releasing the egg). This is called luteinized unruptured follicle syndrome (LUFS). Physical damage to the ovaries, or ovaries with multiple cysts, may affect their ability to function. This is called ovarian dystrophy.

=== Hyperprolactinemia ===
Hyperprolactinemia anovulation makes up 5 to 10 percent of women with anovulation. Hyperprolactinemia inhibits gonadotropin secretion by inhibiting GnRH. Hyperprolactinemia can be confirmed by several measurements of serum prolactin.

== Diagnosis ==
=== Fertility awareness and LH measurement ===
Symptoms-based methods of fertility awareness may be used to detect ovulation or to determine that cycles are anovulatory. Charting of the menstrual cycle may be done by hand, or with the aid of various fertility monitors. Records of one of the primary fertility awareness signs—basal body temperature—can detect ovulation by identifying the shift in temperature which takes place after ovulation. It is said to be the most reliable way of confirming whether ovulation has occurred.

Women may also use ovulation predictor kits (OPKs) which detect the increase in luteinizing hormone (LH) levels that usually indicates imminent ovulation. For some women, these devices do not detect the LH surge, or high levels of LH are a poor predictor of ovulation; this is particularly common in women with PMOS. In such cases, OPKs and those fertility monitors which are based on LH may show false results, with an increased number of false positives or false negatives. Dr. Freundl from the University of Heidelberg suggests that tests which use LH as a reference often lack sensitivity and specificity.

=== Classification and testing ===
The World Health Organization criteria for classification of anovulation include the determination of oligomenorrhea (menstrual cycle >35 days) or amenorrea (menstrual cycle >6 months) in combination with concentration of prolactin, follicle stimulating hormone (FSH) and estradiol (E2). The patients are classified as WHO1 (15%)—hypo-gonadotropic, hypo-estrogenic, WHO2 (80%)—normo-gonadotropic, normo-estrogenic, and WHO3 (5%)—hyper-gonadotropic, hypo-estrogenic. The vast majority of anovulation patients belong to the WHO2 group and demonstrate very heterogeneous symptoms ranging from anovulation, obesity, biochemical or clinical hyperandrogenism and insulin resistance. This classification system does not include a separate category for anovulation caused by hyperprolactinemia, and experts do not consistently use this system.

Diagnosis of anovulation cause involves hormone level tests, in conjunction with an assessment of associated symptoms. A patient history and physical exam should include history of onset and pattern of oligomenorrhea or amenorrhea, signs of PMOS such as hyperandrogenism and obesity, eating disorders, causes of excessive physical or mental stress, and breast secretions. Patients with symptoms of hyperandrogenism, such as hirsutism, can be tested for serum androgen levels as well as serum total testosterone levels. A 17-hydroprogesterone test may also be conducted if congenital adrenal hyperplasia is suspected. If the differential is broad, hormone serum levels of estradiol, follicle-stimulating hormone (FSH), gonadotropin-releasing hormone (GnRH), anti-Müllerian hormone (AMH), thyroid-stimulating hormone (TSH), and prolactin can be diagnostic since most causes of anovulation are hormonal imbalances. Transvaginal ultrasound may also be used to visualize polycystic ovaries.

== Treatments ==
Treatment should be based on diagnosis of anovulation. Treatment varies based on the 4 most common causes of anovulation: polyendocrine metabolic ovarian syndrome (PMOS), hypogonadotropic hypogonadism (HA), primary ovarian insufficiency (POI), and hyperprolactinemia. Importantly, semen analysis should be carried out of the XY partner to exclude severe XY factors before managing anovulatory subfertility. Overall, in healthy individuals with anovulation, ovulatory disorders may be favorably influenced by a healthy diet such as a higher consumption of monounsaturated fats rather than trans fats, vegetable rather than animal protein sources, high fat dairy, multivitamins, and iron from plants and supplements.

=== Treatment for polyendocrine metabolic ovarian syndrome (PMOS) ===
Treatment for management of anovulation due to PMOS is multifaceted, including weight reduction, ovulation induction agents, insulin-sensitizing agents, gonadotrophins and ovarian drilling. In PMOS patients with overweight or obesity, weight loss is first line treatment. Studies show a reduction in weight as little of 5% by caloric restriction and increased physical activity can re-establish spontaneously ovulation and improve response to ovulation induction therapy if initiated. Weight loss also generally results in improved menstrual regularity and pregnancy rates in women with PMOS.

It is well recognized that insulin resistance can be part of the sequelae of PMOS and if present, contribute to anovulation. Metformin, a biguanide, is a common insulin sensitizer often given to treat women with PMOS. No other insulin sensitizers have evidence of effective and safe use of fertility treatment. Previously, metformin was recommended as treatment for anovulation in polyendocrine metabolic ovarian syndrome, but in the largest trial to date, comparing clomiphene with metformin, clomiphene was more effective than metformin alone. Following this study, the ESHRE/ASRM-sponsored A consensus workshop does not recommend metformin for ovulation stimulation. Subsequent randomized studies have confirmed the lack of evidence for adding metformin to clomiphene.

==== Ovulation induction ====
The main ovulation induction medications include:

- Antiestrogen, causing an inhibition of the negative feedback of estrogen on the pituitary gland, resulting in an increase in secretion of follicle-stimulating hormone. Medications in use for this effect are mainly clomifene citrate and tamoxifen (both being selective estrogen-receptor modulators), as well as letrozole (an aromatase inhibitor).
- Follicle-stimulating hormone (FSH), directly stimulating the ovaries. In women with anovulation, it may be an alternative after 7–12 attempted cycles of pituitary feedback regimens (as evidenced by clomifene citrate), since the latter ones are less expensive and more easy to control.

=== Treatment for hypogonadotropic hypogonadism (HA) ===
In women with hypogonadotropic hypogonadism suspicious for functional hypothalamic amenorrhea, treatment should be centered around weight gain, reducing intensity and frequency of exercise, and stress reduction with psychotherapy or counseling. Athletes and women with anorexia can have reduced GnRH pulsing due to hypothalamic dysfunction due to increased energy requirements without their needs being met calorically and severely reduced caloric intake, respectively. If anovulation persists following lifestyle modifications, ovulation can be induced with pulsatile gonadotrophin-releasing hormone (GnRH) or gonadotrophin (FSH & LH) administration.

=== Treatment for primary ovarian insufficiency (POI) ===
For women with POI that desire pregnancy, ovulation induction strategies should be avoided and assisted reproduction, such as in vitro fertilization (IVF) with donor oocytes, should be offered.

=== Treatment for hyperprolactinemia ===
For anovulatory women with hyperprolactinemia without symptoms, they can forgo treatment and continue with close follow up and medical observation. If symptoms of hyperprolactinemia are present, dopamine agonists, such as bromocriptine, are first line treatment which act by inhibiting production of prolactin by the pituitary and can shrink a prolactin-secretin lesion (i.e. prolactinoma) if present. In rare cases, endoscopic transnasal transsphenoidal surgery and radiotherapy, may be required to resect and shrink a prolactinoma if greater than 10 mm in size. Importantly, individuals should be able to conceive following normalization of serum prolactin levels and shrinking or removal of the tumor.

=== Other treatments ===
Corticosteroids (usually found in anti-inflammatory drugs) can be used to treat anovulation if it is caused by an overproduction of male hormones by the adrenal glands. Corticosteroids are usually used to reduce the production of testosterone.
