= Operating temperature =

Temperature range in which the equipment is expected to function reliably

An operating temperature is the allowable temperature range of the local ambient environment at which an electrical or mechanical device operates. The device will operate effectively within a specified temperature range which varies on the basis of the device's function and application context, and ranges from the minimum operating temperature to the maximum operating temperature (or peak operating temperature). Outside this range of safe operating temperatures the device may fail.

It is one component of reliability engineering.

Similarly, biological systems remain viable in a temperature range that equates to an operating temperature.

== Ranges ==
Most semiconductor devices are manufactured in several temperature grades. Broadly accepted grades are:

- Commercial: 0 to 70 °C (32 to 158 °F)
- Industrial: −40 to 85 °C (−40 to 185 °F)
- Military: −55 to 125 °C (−67 to 257 °F)

Nevertheless, each manufacturer defines its own temperature grades, so designers must pay attention to datasheet specifications. For example, Maxim Integrated uses five temperature grades for its products:

- Full Military: −55 to 125 °C (−67 to 257 °F)
- Automotive: −25 to 125 °C (−13 to 257 °F)
- AEC-Q100 Level 2: −40 to 105 °C (−40 to 221 °F)
- Extended Industrial: −40 to 85 °C (−40 to 185 °F)
- Industrial: −20 to 85 °C (−4 to 185 °F)

The use of such grades ensures that a device is suitable for its application and will withstand the environmental conditions in which it is used. Normal operating temperature ranges are affected by several factors, such as the power dissipation of the device. These factors are used to define a "threshold temperature" of a device, i.e. its maximum normal operating temperature and a maximum operating temperature beyond which the device will no longer function. Between these two temperatures, the device will operate at a non-peak level. For instance, a resistor may have a threshold temperature of 70 °C (158 °F) and a maximum temperature of 155 °C (311 °F), between which it exhibits a thermal derating.

For electrical devices, the temperature of the semiconductor in the device, known as junction temperature, is affected by the ambient temperature, and for integrated circuits is given by the equation
$$T_\text{J} = T_\text{a} + P_\text{D} \times R_\text{ja},$$
in which T_{J} is the junction temperature in °C, T_{a} is the ambient temperature in °C, P_{D} is the power dissipation of the integrated circuit in W, and R_{ja} is the junction to ambient thermal resistance in °C/W.

== Aerospace and military ==
Electrical and mechanical devices used in military and aerospace applications may need to endure greater environmental variability, including temperature range.

In the United States Department of Defense has defined the United States Military Standard for all products used by the United States Armed Forces. A product's environmental design and test limits to the conditions that it will undergo throughout its service life are specified in MIL-STD-810, the Department of Defense Test Method Standard for Environmental Engineering Considerations and Laboratory Tests.

The MIL-STD-810G standard specifies that the "operating temperature stabilization is attained when the temperature of the functioning part(s) of the test item considered to have the longest thermal lag is changing at a rate of no more than 2.0 °C (3.6 °F) per hour". It also specifies procedures to assess the performance of materials to extreme temperature loads.

Military engine turbine blades experience two significant deformation stresses during normal service: creep and thermal fatigue. Creep life of a material is "highly dependent on operating temperature", and creep analysis is thus an important part of design validation. Some of the effects of creep and thermal fatigue may be mitigated by integrating cooling systems into the device's design, reducing the peak temperature experienced by the metal.

== Commercial and retail ==
Commercial and retail products are manufactured to less stringent requirements than those for military and aerospace applications. For example, microprocessors produced by Intel Corporation are manufactured to three grades: commercial, industrial and extended.

Because some devices generate heat during operation, they may require thermal management to ensure they are within their specified operating temperature range; specifically, that they are operating at or below the maximum operating temperature of the device. Cooling a microprocessor mounted in a typical commercial or retail configuration requires "a heatsink properly mounted to the processor, and effective airflow through the system chassis". Systems are designed to protect the processor from unusual operating conditions, such as "higher than normal ambient air temperatures or failure of a system thermal management component (such as a system fan)", though in "a properly designed system, this feature should never become active". Cooling and other thermal management techniques may affect performance and noise level. Noise mitigation strategies may be required in residential applications to ensure that the noise level does not become uncomfortable.

Battery service life and efficacy is affected by operating temperature. Efficacy is determined by comparing the service life achieved by the battery as a percentage of its service life achieved at 20 °C (68 °F) versus temperature. Ohmic load and operating temperature often jointly determine a battery's discharge rate. Moreover, if the expected operating temperature for a primary battery deviates from the typical 10 °C to 25 °C (50 to 77 °F) range, then operating temperature "will often have an influence on the type of battery selected for the application". Energy reclamation from partially depleted lithium sulfur dioxide battery has been shown to improve when "appropriately increasing the battery operating temperature".

== Biology ==
Mammals attempt to maintain a comfortable body temperature under various conditions by thermoregulation, part of mammalian homeostasis. The lowest normal temperature of a mammal, the basal body temperature, is achieved during sleep. In women, it is affected by ovulation, causing a biphasic pattern which may be used as a component of fertility awareness.

In humans, the hypothalamus regulates metabolism, and hence the basal metabolic rate. Amongst its functions is the regulation of body temperature. The core body temperature is also one of the classic phase markers for measuring the timing of an individual's circadian rhythm.

Changes to the normal human body temperature may result in discomfort. The most common such change is a fever, a temporary elevation of the body's thermoregulatory set-point, typically by about 1–2 °C (1.8–3.6 °F). Hyperthermia is an acute condition caused by the body absorbing more heat than it can dissipate, whereas hypothermia is a condition in which the body's core temperature drops below that required for normal metabolism, and which is caused by the body's inability to replenish the heat that is being lost to the environment.
