= Body literacy =

Body literacy is a concept in menstrual and reproductive health referring to the ability to observe, interpret, and understand bodily signs associated with the menstrual cycle and reproductive physiology. The term is commonly associated with menstrual health education, fertility awareness, and health literacy frameworks. Recent scholarship has framed body literacy in relation to systems thinking and health literacy frameworks, including discussions of the menstrual cycle as a physiological indicator of overall health and wellbeing.

The concept is used in menstrual health education to describe knowledge and skills related to menstrual cycles, ovulation, hormonal patterns, and reproductive health decision-making. Some researchers use the related term menstrual literacy to describe understanding of menstruation, menstrual health management, and reproductive anatomy.

Body literacy is frequently discussed alongside fertility awareness-based practices, including menstrual cycle charting and observation of physiological biomarkers such as cervical mucus, basal body temperature, and bleeding patterns. Researchers and educators have described these practices as tools for increasing awareness of reproductive health and facilitating communication with healthcare providers.

== History ==
The term "body literacy" began appearing in menstrual health and fertility awareness communities in the early 2000s. The organization Tathapi, an Indian women’s health resource organization, began using and developing the concept of body literacy as a “medium to scientifically explain the processes of the body, its parts and functions to men, women and children of different age groups” as early as the year 2000. Canadian menstrual health educator Laura Wershler used the term publicly at the Society for Menstrual Cycle Research conference in 2005, later defining it with Geraldine Matus and Megan Lalonde in Femme Fertile magazine.

The concept has since appeared in scholarship related to menstrual health, feminist health movements, and reproductive education. Sociologist Chris Bobel discussed body literacy in the context of menstrual activism and contemporary menstrual health education in New Blood: Third-Wave Feminism and the Politics of Menstruation (2010).

Researchers have also used body literacy frameworks in studies of menstrual inequity and reproductive health communication. A 2022 qualitative study conducted in Barcelona described body literacy as the ability to understand connections between bodily processes, health, and wellbeing, and to participate in healthcare decision-making.

== Relationship to menstrual health and technology ==
Body literacy has been discussed in relation to menstrual tracking applications and digital health technologies. A 2019 study examining menstrual tracking apps argued that many applications provided limited support for menstrual literacy, particularly for adolescent and perimenopausal users.

In the 2020s, the term also began appearing in public-health and government program language. A 2026 United States Title X Family Planning Services funding announcement referenced “body literacy counseling” and “body literacy education” in connection with reproductive health education, fertility awareness-based methods, and chronic disease prevention.
