= Kindara =

Femtech company

Kindara Inc.
- Founded: 2011; 15 years ago
- Founder: Will Sacks and Kati Bicknell
- Headquarters: Boulder, Colorado
- Area served: Global
- Products: Priya Fertility and Ovulation Monitor, Kindara Fertility Charting application, Wink Thermometer
- Website: kindara.com

Kindara is a femtech company headquartered in Colorado that develops apps that help women identify their fertile window. The products are used for women trying to get pregnant, or women who want to track their menstrual cycle for overall health. Their latest product, Priya Fertility and Ovulation Monitor, maximizes a woman's chance of getting pregnancy by identifying her most fertile days.

== Overview ==
Kindara was founded in 2011 by husband-and-wife team Will Sacks and Kati Bicknell. The company launched its free mobile application in 2012. Kindara's mobile application allows women to track signs of fertility, such as basal body temperature, cervical fluid, and the position of the cervix to determine when ovulation is occurring. Kindara also sells a thermometer, Wink, which records basal body temperature and syncs automatically to the Kindara fertility application.

In 2018, Kindara was acquired by the company Prima-Temp.
