= Calendar-based contraceptive methods =

Methods of estimating a woman's fertility

Calendar-based methods are various methods of estimating a woman's likelihood of fertility, based on a record of the length of previous menstrual cycles. Various methods are known as the Knaus–Ogino method and the rhythm method. The standard days method is also considered a calendar-based method, because when using it, a woman tracks the days of her menstrual cycle without observing her physical fertility signs. The standard days method is based on a fixed formula taking into consideration the timing of ovulation, the functional life of the sperm and the ovum, and the resulting likelihood of pregnancy on particular days of the menstrual cycle. These methods may be used to achieve pregnancy by timing unprotected intercourse for days identified as fertile, or to avoid pregnancy by avoiding unprotected intercourse during fertile days.

The first formalized calendar-based method was developed in 1930 by John Smulders, a Catholic physician from the Netherlands. It was based on knowledge of the menstrual cycle. This method was independently discovered by Hermann Knaus (Austria), and Kyusaku Ogino (Japan). This system was a main form of birth control available to Catholic couples for several decades, until the popularization of symptoms-based fertility awareness methods. A new development in calendar-based methods occurred in 2002, when Georgetown University introduced the Standard Days Method. The Standard Days Method is promoted in conjunction with a product called CycleBeads, a ring of colored beads which are meant to help the user keep track of her fertile and non-fertile days.

== Terminology ==
While the terms rhythm method and fertility awareness are not synonymous, some sources do treat them as such. However, fertility awareness is usually used as a broad term that includes tracking basal body temperature and cervical mucus as well as cycle length. The World Health Organization considers the rhythm method to be a specific type of calendar-based method, and calendar-based methods to be only one form of fertility awareness.

More effective than calendar-based methods, systems of fertility awareness that track basal body temperature, cervical mucus, or both, are known as symptoms-based methods. Teachers of symptoms-based methods take care to distance their systems from the poor reputation of the rhythm method. Many consider the rhythm method to have been obsolete for at least 20 years, and some even exclude calendar-based methods from their definition of fertility awareness.

Some sources may treat the terms rhythm method and natural family planning as synonymous. In the early 20th century, the calendar-based method known as the rhythm method was promoted by members of the Catholic Church as the only morally acceptable form of family planning. Methods accepted by this church are referred to as natural family planning (NFP): so at one time, the term "the rhythm method" was synonymous with NFP. Today, NFP is an umbrella term that includes symptoms-based fertility awareness methods and the lactational amenorrhea method as well as calendar-based methods such as rhythm. This overlap between uses of the terms "the rhythm method" and "natural family planning" may contribute to confusion.

The first day of bleeding is considered day one of the menstrual cycle.

== History ==
=== Early methods ===
It is not known if historical cultures were aware of what part of the menstrual cycle is most fertile. In the year 388, Augustine of Hippo wrote of periodic abstinence. Addressing followers of Manichaeism, his former religion, he said, "Is it not you who used to counsel us to observe as much as possible the time when a woman, after her purification, is most likely to conceive, and to abstain from cohabitation at that time...?" If the Manichaieans practiced something like the Jewish observances of menstruation, then the "time... after her purification" would have indeed been when "a woman... is most likely to conceive." Over a century previously, however, the influential Greek physician Soranus had written that "the time directly before and after menstruation" was the most fertile part of a woman's cycle; this inaccuracy was repeated in the 6th century by the Byzantine physician Aëtius. Similarly, a Chinese sex manual written close to the year 600 stated that only the first five days following menstruation were fertile. Some historians believe that Augustine, too, incorrectly identified the days immediately after menstruation as the time of highest fertility.

Written references to a "safe period" do not appear again for over a thousand years. Scientific advances prompted a number of secular thinkers to advocate periodic abstinence to avoid pregnancy: in the 1840s it was discovered that many animals ovulate during estrus. Because some animals (such as dogs) have a bloody discharge during estrus, it was assumed that menstruation was the corresponding most fertile time for women. This inaccurate theory was popularized by physicians Bischoff, Félix Archimède Pouchet, and Adam Raciborski. In 1854, an English physician named George Drysdale correctly taught his patients that the days near menstruation are the least fertile, but this remained the minority view for the remainder of the 19th century.

=== Knaus–Ogino or rhythm method ===
In 1905 Theodoor Hendrik van de Velde, a Dutch gynecologist, showed that women only ovulate once per menstrual cycle. In the 1920s, Kyusaku Ogino, a Japanese gynecologist, and Hermann Knaus, from Austria, working independently, each made the discovery that ovulation occurs about fourteen days before the next menstrual period. Ogino used his discovery to develop a formula for use in aiding infertile women to time intercourse to achieve pregnancy.

In 1930, Johannes Smulders, a Roman Catholic physician from the Netherlands, used Knaus and Ogino's discoveries to create a method for avoiding pregnancy. Smulders published his work with the Dutch Roman Catholic medical association, and this was the official rhythm method promoted over the next several decades. In 1932 a Catholic physician, Dr. Leo J Latz, published a book titled The Rhythm of Sterility and Fertility in Women describing the method, and the 1930s also saw the first U.S. Rhythm Clinic (founded by John Rock) to teach the method to Catholic couples.

=== Later 20th century to present ===
In the first half of the 20th century, most users of the rhythm method were Catholic; they were following their church's teaching that all other methods of birth control were sinful. In 1968 the encyclical Humanae vitae included the statement, "It is supremely desirable... that medical science should by the study of natural rhythms succeed in determining a sufficiently secure basis for the chaste limitation of offspring." This is interpreted as favoring the then-new, more reliable symptoms-based fertility awareness methods over the rhythm method. Currently, many fertility awareness teachers consider the rhythm method to have been obsolete for at least 20 years.

New attention was drawn to calendar-based methods in 2002, when the Institute for Reproductive Health at Georgetown University introduced the Standard Days Method. Designed to be simpler to teach and use than the older rhythm method, the Standard Days Method was initially integrated piloted in 30 family planning programs worldwide. However, only 16 countries scaled up beyond pilots, with limited adoption since.

== Types and effectiveness ==
Most menstrual cycles have several days at the beginning that are infertile (pre-ovulatory infertility), a period of fertility, and then several days just before the next menstruation that are infertile (post-ovulatory infertility). The first day of red bleeding is considered day one of the menstrual cycle. To use these methods, a woman is required to know the length of her menstrual cycles.

Imperfect use of calendar-based methods would consist of not correctly tracking the length of the woman's cycles, thus using the wrong numbers in the formula, or of having unprotected intercourse on an identified fertile day. The discipline required to keep accurate records of menstrual cycles, and to abstain from unprotected intercourse, makes imperfect use fairly common. The typical-use failure rate of calendar-based methods is 25% per year.

=== Rhythm method (Knaus–Ogino method) ===
To find the estimated length of the pre-ovulatory infertile phase, eighteen (18) is subtracted from the length of the woman's shortest cycle. To find the estimated start of the post-ovulatory infertile phase, eleven (11) is subtracted from the length of the woman's longest cycle. A woman whose menstrual cycles ranged in length from 30 to 36 days would be estimated to be infertile for the first 11 days of her cycle (30-19=11), to be fertile on days 12–25, and to resume infertility on day 26 (36-10=26). When used to avoid pregnancy, such fertility awareness-based methods have a typical-use failure rate of 25% per year.

=== Standard days method ===
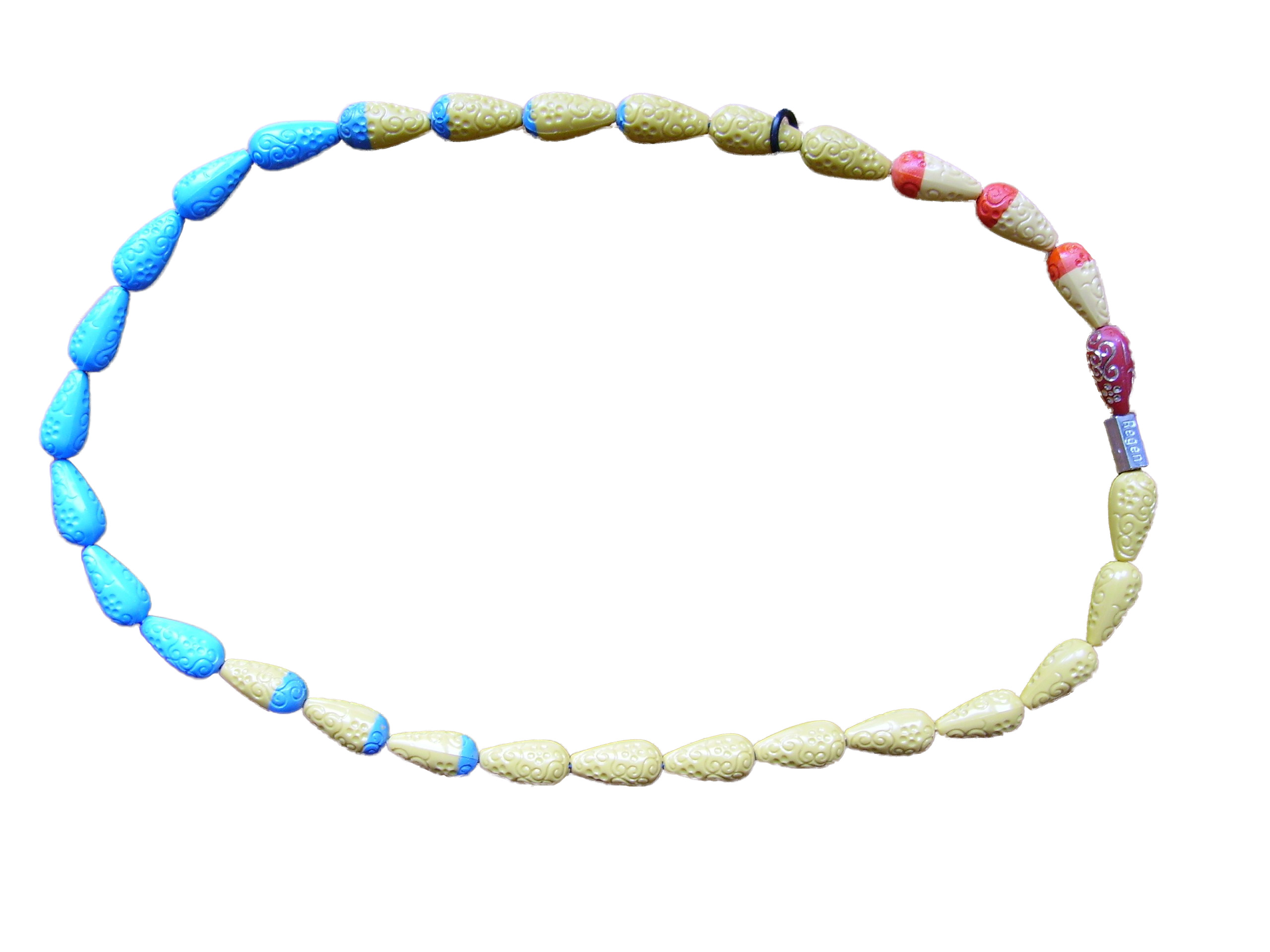
A CycleBeads birth control chain, used for a rough estimate of fertility based on days since menstruation

Developed at Georgetown University's Institute for Reproductive Health, the standard days method is a variation of the rhythm method that has a simpler rule set and is more effective than the Knaus–Ogino method. A product called CycleBeads was developed alongside the method to help the user keep track of estimated high and low fertility points during her menstrual cycle. The standard days method is only effective for women whose cycles are consistently between 26 and 32 days in length; it is estimated that between 50% and 60% of women of reproductive age satisfy this condition. In this system:

- Days 1–7 of a woman's menstrual cycle are considered infertile
- Days 8–19 are considered fertile; considered unsafe for unprotected intercourse
- Day 20 through the end of the cycle are considered infertile.

When used to avoid pregnancy, the standard days method has been estimated to have perfect-use efficacy of 95% and typical-use efficacy of 88%. These figures are based on a 2002 study in Bolivia, Peru, and the Philippines of women of reproductive age having menstrual cycles between 26 and 32 days, and on a 2014 study in Turkey. However, other researchers have criticized the methodology of the first study, have stated that the 95% figure has been presented to the public in misleading ways, and have argued that the true efficacy figures are likely to be much lower. Another meta study indicated that typical-use efficacy ranged between 90% and 82%, a bit lower than the 88% figure originally found.

== Software-based systems ==
Several web-based implementations of the cycle method exist, as well as mobile apps such as Natural Cycles.

== Advantages ==
The Standard Days method (SDM) was introduced as part of family planning programs in developing countries. The method is satisfactory for many women and men. The low cost of the method may also enable it to play a useful role in countries that lack funding to provide other methods of birth control.

== Potential concerns ==
=== Failure rate ===
One concern related to the use of calendar-based methods is their relatively high failure rate, compared to other methods of birth control. Even when used perfectly, calendar-based methods, especially the rhythm method, result in a high pregnancy rate among couples intending to avoid pregnancy. Of commonly known methods of birth control, only the cervical cap and contraceptive sponge have comparably high failure rates. This lower level of reliability of calendar-based methods is because their formulas make several assumptions that are not always true.

The postovulatory (luteal) phase has a normal length of 12 to 16 days, and the rhythm method formula assumes all women have luteal phase lengths within this range. However, many women have shorter luteal phases, and a few have longer luteal phases. For these women, the rhythm method formula incorrectly identifies a few fertile days as being in the infertile period. Roughly 30-50% of women have phases outside this range.

Finally, calendar-based methods assume that all bleeding is true menstruation. However, mid-cycle or anovulatory bleeding can be caused by a number of factors. Incorrectly identifying bleeding as menstruation will cause the method's calculations to be incorrect.

=== Embryonic health ===
It has been suggested that pregnancies resulting from failures of periodic abstinence methods are at increased risk of miscarriage and birth defects due to aged gametes at the time of conception. Other research suggests that timing of conception has no effect on miscarriage rates, low birth weight, or preterm delivery.

=== Destruction of fertilized eggs ===
Philosopher Luc Bovens has suggested that the use of the rhythm method probably results in a large number of abortions, because unprotected intercourse in the infertile periods of the menstrual cycle may still result in conceptions but create zygotes incapable of implanting. Bovens's argument assumes that any and all destruction of fertilized eggs is abortion.
