= Periodic abstinence =

Periodic abstinence may refer to:

- The use of fertility awareness as birth control
- Following the Roman Catholic Church's teachings on natural family planning
