= Small Giant =

The phrase "Small Giant" may refer to:

- the Small Giant Clam, a species of saltwater bivalve
- The Small Giant, a cartoon series
- Small Giant Games, a mobile game company
- a character in Haikyū!!
