= Beamery =

British human resources software company

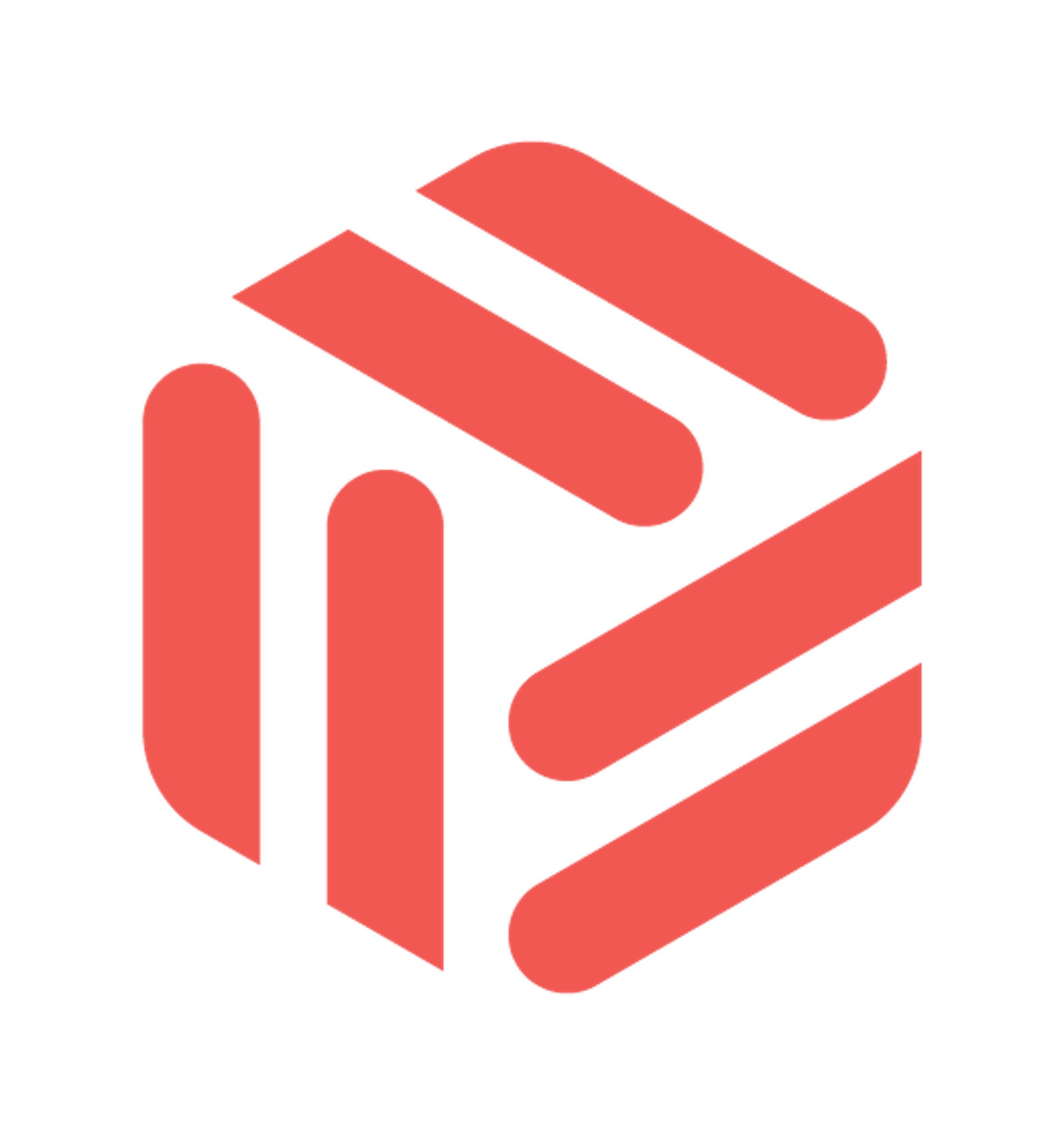
- Formerly: Seed.Jobs
- Type: Private
- Industry: Human resources software
- Founded: 2013; 13 years ago
- Founder: Abakar Saidov; Sultan Saidov; Michael Paterson
- Headquarters: London, United Kingdom
- Key people: Has Dosanjh (CEO)
- Number of employees: Approximately 200 (2026)
- Website: beamery.com

Beamery is a British human resources software company headquartered in London. It develops an artificial intelligence-based platform for recruitment, talent management, workforce planning, and employee development. The company was founded in 2013 by brothers Abakar and Sultan Saidov and Michael Paterson. Has Dosanjh is its chief executive officer.

== History ==
=== Early years ===
The company was founded in London in 2013 under the name Seed.Jobs. Its founders—Abakar Saidov, Sultan Saidov and Michael Paterson—had previously worked in finance, including roles at Goldman Sachs and Morgan Stanley. Beamery participated in the AngelPad startup accelerator.

The company's initial product applied the customer relationship management model to recruiting. It allowed employers to identify prospective candidates, track interactions with them and maintain relationships before a formal job application was submitted. The software used machine learning to estimate a candidate's interest in an employer and to match prospective hires with roles.

In June 2016, Beamery raised US$2 million in seed funding from Edenred Capital Partners and Grupa Pracuj. The company said the funding would be used for product development and expansion in the United States.

=== Expansion ===
In April 2017, Beamery raised $5 million in a Series A round led by Index Ventures. At the time it had approximately 50 customers and planned to expand its workforce and establish a sales and marketing office in the San Francisco Bay Area, while retaining its engineering operation in London.

A $28 million Series B round led by EQT Ventures followed in June 2018. Beamery said it would use the investment to support customer growth and expand its offices in London, Austin, Texas, and San Francisco. Contemporary coverage described the business as a candidate-relationship-management service designed to help employers engage potential hires before vacancies opened.

In February 2019, Workday made a strategic investment in Beamery through Workday Ventures and added it to the Workday Software Partner Program. Later that year, Beamery introduced a broader platform divided into tools for attracting candidates, managing candidate relationships and supporting internal employee mobility. TechCrunch reported that the company employed about 160 people at the time.

In 2020, Beamery ranked tenth in Deloitte's UK Technology Fast 50, based on reported revenue growth of 3,541% over three years. The company was also selected for the 2020 cohort of Tech Nation's Future Fifty programme for late-stage UK technology companies.

=== Growth, funding and restructuring ===
In June 2021, Beamery raised $138 million in a Series C round led by the Ontario Teachers' Pension Plan. Other participants included Accenture Ventures, EQT Ventures, Index Ventures, M12 and Workday Ventures. Although the company did not publicly disclose a valuation, TechCrunch reported an estimated value of about $800 million. The publication also reported that employers using Beamery had filled approximately one million external and internal roles through the platform during the preceding year.

In April 2022, Beamery acquired Flux, an internal talent-mobility platform. The acquisition extended Beamery from external candidate relationship management into internal role matching and employee development, and its technology was used in the Beamery Grow product.

In December 2022, Beamery raised $50 million in Series D funding at a $1 billion valuation. The round, again led by an investment arm of the Ontario Teachers' Pension Plan, brought the company's total funding at the time to $228 million and gave it unicorn status.

In January 2023, Beamery announced plans to reduce its workforce by approximately 12%, citing inflation, energy costs, high interest rates and a decline in startup funding. A further restructuring announced in November 2023 affected about 25% of its workforce.

=== Leadership and management ===
Abakar Saidov was chief executive during the company's early development and funding rounds. In April 2025, Beamery announced that Sultan Saidov would become chief executive and that Abakar Saidov would move to the role of executive chairman. Has Dosanjh subsequently became chief executive in 2025; by November, he was identified in independent trade coverage as Beamery's CEO. UK corporate filings record his appointment as a director of Beamery Ltd effective 22 September 2025.

Before joining Beamery, Dosanjh was appointed chief executive of the data-science and artificial-intelligence company ExploreAI in 2022. His earlier career included founding retail-data software company EYC, later Symphony EYC, and holding positions connected with dunnhumby, PepsiCo Europe and the Mercedes-Benz motorsport organization. Reporting on his Beamery appointment also cited leadership or advisory work at Ahold Delhaize, Oliver Wyman, Huge and retail-data businesses. At Beamery, Dosanjh has discussed applying AI to organizational design and using task-level workforce data to inform automation, reskilling and operating-model decisions.

Beamery's chief marketing officer is Soren Mills. Mills previously worked in European marketing for PepsiCo, including responsibility for the Mountain Dew and 7 Up brands, and later was chief marketing officer of online retailer Newegg. In 2017, he was a co-founder and chief executive of AIQ, a marketing agency formed to apply artificial intelligence to consumer-brand and retail data. His public communications at Beamery have emphasized the company's development of domain-specific language models for job descriptions, roles and skills; this characterization comes from Mills rather than independent technical evaluation. Rami Al Batal became Beamery's head of artificial intelligence in January 2026. He received a doctorate in computer science from Joseph Fourier University, now part of Grenoble Alpes University, in 2010 and later worked as a postdoctoral researcher at Dublin City University's Insight Centre for Data Analytics. His academic work covered lifelogging, automatic image classification, information retrieval, recommender systems and machine learning; he also co-led the Insight Centre's lifelogging research group. Before Beamery, his roles included co-founding video-AI company Perfogram, chief AI officer of algo1, chief data scientist at SEEEN and founding privacy-oriented video-redaction company SeekLayer.

== Investors and strategic partnerships ==
Beamery's financing has combined institutional venture capital with investments from companies in the human-resources and enterprise-software industries. Its 2016 seed round was backed by Edenred Capital Partners and Polish human-resources technology company Grupa Pracuj. Index Ventures led the 2017 Series A round, and EQT Ventures, the venture-capital arm of Swedish investment group EQT AB, led the 2018 Series B round.

Workday became both a strategic investor and a commercial partner in 2019 through Workday Ventures. Beamery joined the Workday Software Partner Program, while Workday selected Beamery's CRM and marketing products for its own talent-acquisition operation. The product relationship subsequently developed into certified integrations with Workday Recruiting and Workday Skills Cloud. The recruiting integration synchronizes vacancies and candidate data between Workday and Beamery; Workday remains the system of record for requisitions and applications, while Beamery is used for sourcing, candidate pipelines and relationship management.

The Ontario Teachers' Pension Plan led Beamery's $138 million Series C investment in 2021 through its Teachers' Innovation Platform. The round also included Accenture Ventures, EQT Ventures, Index Ventures, M12—Microsoft's venture fund—and Workday Ventures. Several of those investors were also users or strategic partners of Beamery's software, giving the financing round a mixture of financial and commercial participants. Teachers' Ventures Growth, another Ontario Teachers' investment platform, returned to lead the 2022 Series D round that valued Beamery at $1 billion.

Beamery also maintains a product partnership with SAP. In 2023, its Talent Lifecycle Management application became an SAP Endorsed App available through SAP Store. Its certified SAP SuccessFactors integrations connect Beamery's skills data and recruiting functions with SAP's Talent Intelligence Hub, Job Profile Builder and Recruiting products. Unlike Workday, SAP is documented as a technology and distribution partner rather than an investor.

== Products and services ==
=== Platform architecture ===
Beamery is sold as a modular software as a service platform for large organizations. Gartner Peer Insights classifies it in the candidate relationship management and internal talent marketplace categories, and describes its scope as extending from candidate sourcing and engagement to internal mobility, skills intelligence and workforce planning. Beamery organizes its current products into three broad layers: a data and talent-intelligence foundation, a workforce-intelligence suite, and a talent-acquisition execution suite.

The platform combines an organization's existing human-resources data with information about roles, skills, tasks, candidates and external labor markets. Those shared data are used across recruitment, employee redeployment, job design and workforce-planning workflows. This expanded scope developed from the company's earlier candidate-relationship-management software; TechCrunch described the 2021 product as an end-to-end “talent operating system” covering sourcing, hiring, retention and workforce analysis.

=== Data and talent intelligence ===
Beamery's Skills Intelligence module creates and maintains a skills framework by analyzing human-resources records, job descriptions and other organizational data. It maps roles to skills and proficiency requirements, and connects those mappings to recruiting and workforce-planning processes.

Task Intelligence breaks roles into constituent tasks and records factors such as the frequency and effort associated with the work. Beamery introduced this capability as part of its Workforce Intelligence Suite in July 2025, positioning it as a way to examine how automation could change jobs, identify duplicated work and support role redesign.

Talent Market Insights adds external labor-market information to internal workforce data. The module covers the availability and geographic distribution of workers, compensation ranges, hiring demand, and skills described as emerging or declining. Recruiters and workforce planners can use those data when defining a role or comparing hiring locations.

The related Job Design and Calibration product connects job definitions with skills and labor-market data. It is intended to standardize roles, compare hiring requirements with market supply and show how changes to a job specification affect the available candidate pool.

=== Workforce intelligence and artificial intelligence ===
The Workforce Intelligence Suite uses the platform's role, skill, task, headcount and cost data for organizational analysis and scenario planning. Its functions include comparing organizational structures, identifying overlapping roles, examining talent risks and modelling combinations of recruitment, redeployment, reskilling and automation.

Beamery describes the connected model of an organization's roles, workers, skills and tasks as a workforce “digital twin”. The suite includes Ray, a conversational software agent that can query this model and produce recommendations for workforce-planning questions. Independent trade coverage has described Beamery's approach as using task, role and workforce data to evaluate the organizational effects of AI and automation. Under Al Batal, Beamery has publicly described its AI work as including proprietary language models trained for the vocabulary and context of jobs, roles and skills rather than relying solely on general-purpose model APIs. His published explanations also describe a data layer that reconciles inconsistent job titles, skills and workflows into a canonical organizational model, and emphasize explainability in recommendation systems. These descriptions are statements by Beamery's AI leadership and have not been independently benchmarked in the cited material. Al Batal's earlier academic specialization in information retrieval, recommender systems and multimedia analysis predates his work at the company.

=== Research and recognition ===
In the 2026 ACM RecSys Challenge, a Beamery team competing as "volart" placed second overall among 40 teams and first in the industry track. The challenge evaluated conversational music-recommendation systems; volart received a score of 4.9 out of 5 on the organisers' "LLM-as-a-Judge" metric.

Beamery also publishes workforce surveys under the Beamery Talent Index name. The sixth edition, released in 2022, surveyed more than 6,000 office-based workers in the United Kingdom, United States and France about their employment, workplace culture and career development.

A 2025 Beamery survey on workplace AI included more than 170 C-suite executives, 115 human-resources leaders and 200 early-career employees at large United States companies. HR Dive reported that 30 percent of the HR respondents said they were involved in AI strategy from the outset, compared with 60 percent of C-suite respondents who believed HR had been involved from the beginning.

=== Talent acquisition and candidate engagement ===
Talent CRM remains the central candidate database and relationship-management component. It stores candidate profiles and interaction histories, supports talent pools and workflow automation, and can include both external candidates and existing employees. The product descends from Beamery's original recruitment CRM, which allowed employers to track and communicate with prospective hires before they submitted an application.

The current talent-acquisition suite also includes:

- Sourcing and Matching, which imports or identifies prospective candidates and ranks matches using role and skills data;
- Talent Marketing, which manages segmented email, text-message and other candidate-engagement campaigns;
- Talent Analytics, which reports on recruiting pipelines, campaign conversion, user activity and the completeness of candidate data;
- Events and Campus, for managing recruiting events, attendee registration and follow-up;
- Career Sites and Chatbot, a content-management and conversational interface for employer career websites that sends registrations and applications into the Talent CRM; and
- candidate portals and alumni-management workflows for maintaining contact with applicants, talent communities and former employees.

This range reflects the product expansion announced in 2019, when Beamery divided its offering into attraction, engagement and retention functions and added career-site, recruiting-event and internal-mobility tools to its existing CRM and integration components.

=== Integrations and professional services ===
Beamery integrates with human capital management and applicant-tracking systems. Its documented integrations include Workday, SAP SuccessFactors and Oracle Taleo, with data synchronization between those systems and Beamery's candidate, vacancy, role and skills records. The Workday relationship began with a strategic investment and software partnership in 2019.

The company also sells advisory, implementation and enablement services alongside the software. These services cover data preparation, skills-framework design, system configuration, integration, rollout and continuing operational support.
