= Elina Berglund =

Swedish physicist and entrepreneur

Elina Berglund Scherwitzl (born 1984) is a Swedish particle physicist and entrepreneur who, together with her husband Raoul Scherwitzl, has developed an app to indicate the days when a woman is most fertile. It can be used both for birth control and for planning a family. The app is marketed as Natural Cycles, which is also the name of the company the couple founded to produce it in 2013.

== Biography ==
Born in 1984, Elina Berglund was raised in Malmö in southern Sweden. Her father is a professor of medicine, but both he and her mother are entrepreneurs, running several companies together. She began to be interested in physics at the age of five when her father talked to her about the universe. She went on to study engineering physics at the Lund Institute of Technology, receiving a master of science degree in 2008. She then spent three years at the University of Geneva, culminating in a PhD in elementary particle physics in 2011. In parallel with her studies, she collaborated in the ATLAS project at CERN, working with a team that would win the Nobel Prize for the discovery of the Higgs boson particle at CERN.

One month after the announcement of Higgs boson discovery in the summer of 2012, Berglund left CERN as the experiment facility was closing for an upgrade over the next two years. She married her physicist colleague Raoul Scherwitzl and the couple started to think about raising a family. After deciding to stop using the contraceptive pill, she began to analyse her body temperature in order to reveal the days when she was most fertile. "I wanted to give my body a break from the pill," she explained, "but I couldn't find any good forms of natural birth control, so I wrote an algorithm for myself." With her husband's encouragement, this led her to develop a fertility app, suitable for use by any woman.

The couple gave up their physics jobs and moved to Sweden to concentrate on developing and marketing the app, founding the company Natural Cycles in 2013. They successfully used the app to plan the birth of their daughter. Although they began to market the product in 2014 with approval from the Swedish Medicinal Products Agency, they ran into trouble the following year when the agency revoked approval, forcing them to remove any reference to contraception in marketing the app. It was only in February 2017 that they finally received approval from the German inspection and certification organisation Tüv Süd, allowing them to market the product throughout Europe. It was the first time a technical device of this type had been approved for contraception anywhere in the world.

When asked by Mimmi Rito of Visma whether she intended to spend her life working on the app, she replied: "No, but I think I will always work with something involving data, analysing data, drawing conclusions, applying data to something or other. It does not need to be physical, it does not need to be contraception, but that's the common denominator now, and I think it will always continue to be."

== Awards ==
In 2015, Berglund received the Women in Tech Foundation's Entrepreneurial Award.
