= EQT Ventures =

Venture capital arm of EQT AB

- Type: Subsidiary
- Industry: Venture Capital
- Founded: 2016; 10 years ago
- Founder: Hjalmar Winbladh
- Headquarters: Stockholm, Sweden
- Parent: EQT AB
- Website: www.eqtventures.com

EQT Ventures is the venture capital business of Swedish investment manager EQT AB. In May 2016, EQT Ventures announced its first €566m fund that makes minority equity investments in European and US tech companies ranging between €1 million and €50 million.

Investments made include:

- Oden Technologies
- Holidu
- Riskmethods
- Min Doktor
- Wolt
- Verto Analytics
- Unomaly
- 3D Hubs
- Service Partner One
- Watty
- myTomorrows
- Small Giant Games
- Peakon
- HackerOne
- Token
- Netlify.
- Varjo
- Natural Cycles
- Permutive
- Codacy
- Tinyclues
- Einride
- Darkstore
- Standard Cognition
- Cytora
- dott
- Beamery
- Handshake
- AnyDesk

== See also ==
- List of venture capital firms
