= Apyrexy =

Absence of fever

In pathology, apyrexy, or apyrexia (Greek Ancient Greek: απυρεξια, from α-, privative, Ancient Greek: πυρεσσειν, to be in a fever, Ancient Greek: πυρ, fire, fever) is the normal interval or period of intermission in a fever or the absence of a fever.
