= Small Giant Games =

Finnish mobile game developer

- Type: Subsidiary
- Industry: Mobile game development
- Founded: 2013 in Helsinki, Finland
- Fate: Acquired by Zynga in 2018
- Headquarters: Helsinki, Finland
- Key people: Timo Soininen (CEO)
- Products: Oddwings Escape; Empires and Puzzles; Puzzle Combat
- Number of employees: 47 (2018)
- Parent: Zynga
- Website: www.smallgiantgames.com

Small Giant Games is a mobile game development company based in Helsinki, Finland. It was founded in 2013 by former employees of mobile game maker Sulake. After producing two casual games, Small Giant found success with a match-three role-playing game entitled Empires and Puzzles. After the success of Empires and Puzzles, Small Giant was acquired by Zynga in December 2018.

== Early ventures ==
Small Giant Games was founded in 2013 in Helsinki, Finland by a group of individuals laid off by mobile game developer Sulake. Otto Nieminen, formerly Sulake's product development officer, was the company's founding chief executive officer, with Timo Soininen, former CEO of Sulake, assuming the CEO role at Small Giant in 2014. Ex-Sulake chief technology officer Markus Halttunen joined Small Giant in the same position. Developers Ilkka Juopperi and Tommi Vallisto rounded out the Small Giant staff.

By October 2013, Small Giant had raised $750,000 in seed money. Later that year, the company completed a fundraising campaign that generated US$3.1 million to allow them to launch their first mobile game, OddWings Escape. The game launched on May 14, 2015. In his review for Pocket Gamer, Harry Slater described the game: "Oddwings Escape is a game about genetically modified mutant ducks flying through lovely looking backdrops. You have to collect hearts and coins, avoid bombs, and get as far as you can." OddWings Escape was downloaded over 1 million times in the week following its launch. The game's early success was credited, in part, to its having been translated into 15 different languages at launch, giving it broader international appeal.

Small Giant's second game, Rope Racers, involved racing through levels against ghost characters by swinging from a rope that could be projected from the player's character.

== Empires and Puzzles ==
Following OddWings Escape and Rope Racers, Soininen described a change in Small Giant's focus away from casual games: "we decided to kill those products pretty quickly and start looking for the big one. How could we really get that top-50 grossing game? What does it take?" EQT Ventures provided Small Giant with EUR 5.4 million in venture capital in 2017 for marketing and game development. In March 2017, Small Giant launched, Empires and Puzzles, a match-three puzzle game that also incorporates elements of role-playing games. By the end of the year, Small Giant reported that Empires and Puzzles had generated US$33 million in revenue. The game won the Game of the Year award at the 2017 Finnish Game Awards in 2017.

EQT Ventures invested an additional US$41 million in Small Giant Games in January 2018 to assist with scaling the game to a larger audience. Only four months into the year, Empires and Puzzles exceeded its revenue generation for 2017. By the end of 2018, it had been downloaded 26 million times from the Google Play Store and Apple App Store. Empires and Puzzles won the award for "Best Breakthrough Hit" in the 2018 Google Play Awards; Small Giant was a nominee for Best Live Ops and Best Developer at the Pocket Gamer Mobile Games Awards in 2019.

On September 17, 2024 Empires & Puzzles released their first major game expansion and largest content update, Dragon Dawn.

== Acquisition by Zynga ==
In December 2018, Zynga announced that it had reached an agreement to purchase Small Giant Games. Zynga purchased 80% of the company initially for US$330 million in cash and US$230 million in Zynga unregistered common stock. The terms for purchasing the remaining portion of the company was set to be based on its performance over the three years following the initial acquisition.

Empires and Puzzles continued to perform well for Small Giant and Zynga. In October 2019, the game reached US$500 million in lifetime revenue and reached 41 million downloads. In May 2020, Zynga paid the first of three installments for the remaining 20 percent of the company, transferring $122 million to Small Giant after Zynga posted $404 million in revenue for the first quarter of 2020, a 52% increase. The strong performance of Empires & Puzzles resulted in a second performance-based earnout payment of $240 million in May 2021, and total payments for the acquisition ultimately surpassed $922 million. Empires and Puzzles celebrated a new milestone for the game with its 9 year anniversary on March 18th, 2026. Small Giant soft launched its next game, Puzzle Combat, on March 8, 2019. The game shares many gameplay elements with Empires and Puzzles, but it features a modern warfare setting.
