= Natural Cycles =

Fertility tracking software

Natural Cycles is the company behind the Natural Cycles birth control app. The app was the first to be certified as a contraceptive in the European Union and in August 2018 the Food and Drug Administration approved U.S. marketing for the contraceptive app as a Class II medical device. It remains the only digital form of birth control on the market in the United States and has also received regulatory clearances from Canada (Health Canada), Australia (TGA), Singapore (HSA), and South Korea (MFDS).

The Stockholm-based company, which was co-founded by particle physicists Dr. Elina Berglund Scherwitzl and Dr. Raoul Scherwitzl, has received $100 million in funding.

== History ==
Berglund was a physicist partly based at CERN, collaborating with the team who discovered the Higgs boson, before co-founding the company with her husband Scherwitzl. Because the couple was in search of an alternative natural contraceptive themselves, Berglund used data analysis to develop an algorithm designed to pinpoint her ovulation.

The couple then decided to create an app with the underlying algorithm, Natural Cycles. Following several medical trials, the app became the first tech-based device to be certified for use as contraception in the European Union in February 2017 by the European inspection and certification organisation TÜV SÜD. In November 2017 Natural Cycles received a $30M investment in series B round led by EQT Ventures fund, with participation from existing investors Sunstone, E-ventures and Bonnier Growth Media (the VC arm of privately held Swedish media group, the Bonnier Group).

While the app is currently only certified in the European Union, where its users are concentrated in the United Kingdom and the Scandinavian countries, it is available worldwide. Natural Cycles offers a subscription product, which had over 800,000 users across 160 countries as of June 2018. 75 percent use the app as a contraceptive, and the rest use it to try to become pregnant.

The app works by having users take their temperature each morning immediately after waking and logging it into the app. This is done with a basal thermometer. The apps algorithm calculation is based on the observation that post-ovulation, progesterone warms the female body by up to 0.45 °C. Natural Cycles algorithm then determines, based on the temperature, whether the user is fertile or not. A red day means fertile (which is when one should abstain or use a condom); a green day means not fertile. For the app to remain effective, women need to follow the app's instructions correctly, and it does not protect its users from sexually transmitted diseases.

In 2019, the company completed a pilot program in Sweden that tested a feature to help women trying to get pregnant determine if they should seek fertility help. A new mode also became available in 2019 that helps users monitor pregnancy.

== Research ==
Studies carried out by the app's creators have found it to be as effective in preventing pregnancies as the contraceptive pill for typical use (for perfect use, Natural Cycles effectiveness was lower than the contraceptive pill's). These studies, however, only consider women who were paying members and were within the age range 20-35.

== Criticism ==
In 2018, Södersjukhuset, a hospital in Stockholm, Sweden, filed a complaint with the Medical Products Agency of Sweden after 37 women who had been using Natural Cycles as their primary method of contraception sought an abortion at the hospital after becoming pregnant unintentionally. Natural Cycles responded by saying the number of pregnancies was within the reported effectiveness rates. In the UK, the app came under investigation by the Advertising Standards Authority over supposedly misleading claims in its marketing; the complaint was upheld by the ASA in August 2018, concluding that the app misled consumers regarding being "highly accurate" and a "clinically tested alternative to birth control". A number of users and healthcare professionals have expressed concerns over the efficacy of the app.

In August 2018, Lauren Streicher, professor of clinical obstetrics at Northwestern University's Feinberg School of Medicine expressed concerns over the Food and Drug Administration's approval of the app. Streicher has claimed that the app is "problematic" as it relies on users' self-reported temperatures which must be taken as soon as they wake up each morning in order to be accurate. In an interview with Vox, Streicher claimed "The minute you rely on action, the efficacy goes down."

Natural Cycles has also been criticised for its marketing strategy of paying social media influencers to promote the app. In July 2018 researchers at the London School of Hygiene and Tropical Medicine published a study which claimed "Natural Cycles' marketing materials ought to be entirely transparent, more clear than they currently are about the limitations of their app and pregnancy risks".

== See also ==
- Calendar-based contraceptive methods
- Natural family planning
