= Mittelschmerz =

Medical term for ovulation pain

- Other names: Ovulation pain, mid-cycle pain
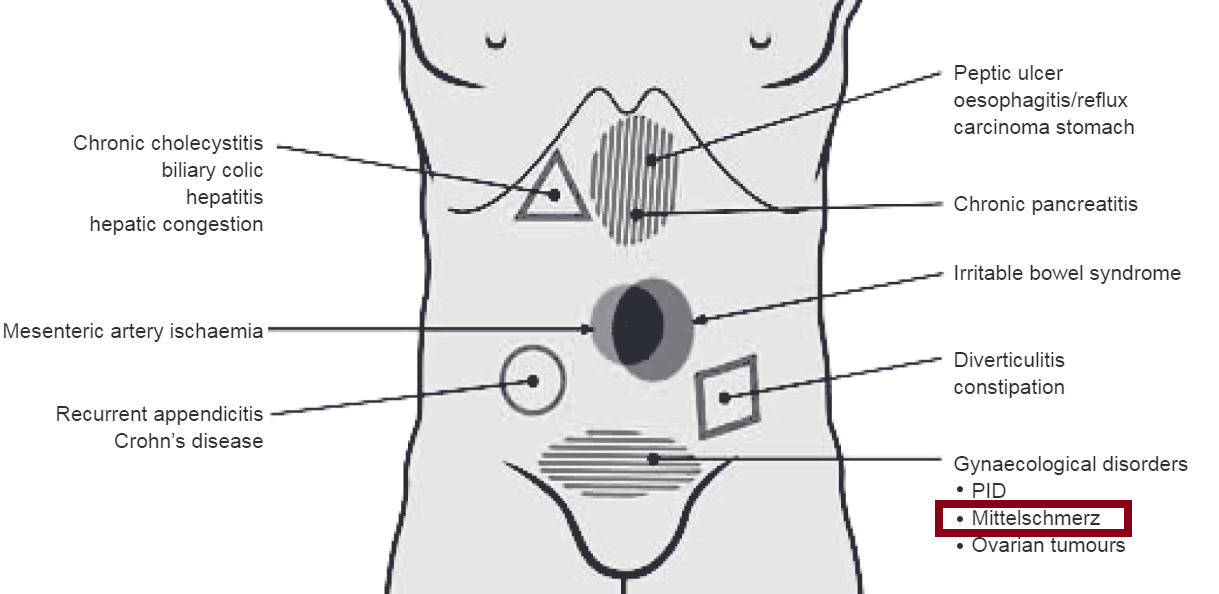
- Approximate location of abdominal pain based on potential causes
- Specialty: Gynecology
- Symptoms: One sided lower abdominal pain, spotting
- Usual onset: Mid menstrual cycle
- Duration: Minutes to days
- Causes: Related to ovulation but mechanism unclear
- Diagnostic method: After ruling out other potential causes
- Differential diagnosis: Appendicitis, endometriosis, ovarian cyst, ectopic pregnancy, sexually transmitted infections
- Prevention: Birth control pills
- Treatment: Paracetamol, ibuprofen
- Prognosis: None serious
- Frequency: 40% of women

Mittelschmerz (German: [ˈmɪtl̩ʃmɛʁt͡s]) is a term for pain due to ovulation. It occurs mid-cycle (between days 7 and 24) and can last minutes to up to several days. The pain affects one side of the lower abdomen and may be dull or sharp in nature. Other symptoms may include spotting. Often it occurs monthly and may alternate sides.

The underlying mechanism is unclear but may involve irritation due to release of blood and fluid from the follicle or high blood levels of luteinizing hormone causing contraction of smooth muscle. Diagnosis involves ruling out other potential causes such as appendicitis, endometriosis, ovarian cysts, ectopic pregnancy, and sexually transmitted infections.

Treatment may involve paracetamol or ibuprofen. Birth control pills may be used for prevention. It is not serious, though may reoccur. Mittelschmerz affects about 20–40% of women. The term is from the German for "middle pain". Its presence has been used to manage fertility.

== Signs and symptoms ==
Mittelschmerz is characterized by lower abdominal and pelvic pain that occurs roughly midway through a woman's menstrual cycle. The pain can appear suddenly and usually subsides within hours, although it may sometimes last two or three days. In some cases it can last up to the following cycle. In some women, the mittelschmerz is localized enough so that they can tell which of their two ovaries provided the egg in a given month. Because ovulation occurs on a random ovary each cycle, the pain may switch sides or stay on the same side from one cycle to another.

=== Other ovulation symptoms ===
Women may notice other physical symptoms associated with their mittelschmerz, during or near ovulation. The most common sign is the appearance of fertile cervical mucus in the days leading up to ovulation. Cervical mucus is one of the primary signs used by various fertility awareness methods. Other symptoms are sometimes called secondary fertility signs to distinguish from the three primary signs.

- Mid-cycle or ovulatory bleeding is thought to result from the sudden drop in estrogen that occurs just before ovulation. This drop in hormones can trigger withdrawal bleeding in the same way that switching from active to placebo birth control pills does. The rise in hormones that occurs after ovulation prevents such mid-cycle spotting from becoming as heavy or long lasting as a typical menstruation. Spotting is more common in longer cycles.
- A woman's vulva may swell just prior to ovulation, especially the side on which ovulation will occur.
- One of the groin lymph nodes (on the side on which ovulation will occur) will swell to about the size of a pea, and may become tender.

== Causes ==
Mittelschmerz is believed to have a variety of causes:

- Follicular swelling: The swelling of follicles in the ovaries prior to ovulation. While only one or two eggs mature to the point of being released, a number of follicles grow during the follicular phase of the menstrual cycle (non-dominant follicles atrophy prior to ovulation). Because follicles develop on both sides, this theory explains mittelschmerz that occurs simultaneously on both sides of the abdomen.
- Ovarian wall rupture: The ovaries have no openings; at ovulation the egg breaks through the ovary's wall. This may make ovulation itself painful for some women.
- Fallopian tube contraction: After ovulation, the fallopian tubes contract (similar to peristalsis of the esophagus), which may cause pain in some women.
- Smooth muscle cell contraction: At ovulation, this pain may be related to smooth muscle cell contraction in the ovary as well as in its ligaments. These contractions occur in response to an increased level of prostaglandin F2-alpha, itself mediated by the surge of luteinizing hormone (LH).
- Irritation: At the time of ovulation, blood or other fluid is released from the ruptured egg follicle. This fluid may cause irritation of the abdominal lining.

== Diagnosis ==
Diagnosis of mittelschmerz is generally made if a woman is mid-cycle and a pelvic examination shows no abnormalities. If the pain is prolonged and/or severe, other diagnostic procedures such as an abdominal ultrasound may be performed to rule out other causes of abdominal pain.

The pain of mittelschmerz is sometimes mistaken for appendicitis and is one of the differential diagnoses for appendicitis in women of child-bearing age.

== Treatment ==
The pain is not harmful and does not signify the presence of disease. No treatment is usually necessary. Pain relievers (analgesics) such as NSAIDs (non-steroidal anti inflammatories) may be needed in cases of prolonged or intense pain.

Hormonal forms of contraception can be taken to prevent ovulation—and therefore ovulatory pain—but otherwise there is no known prevention.

== Usefulness ==
Women charting with some form of fertility awareness may find mittelschmerz to be a helpful secondary sign in detecting ovulation. Because normal sperm life is up to five days, however, mittelschmerz alone does not provide sufficient advance warning to avoid pregnancy. Because other causes of minor abdominal pain are common, mittelschmerz alone also cannot be used to confirm the beginning of the post-ovulatory infertile period.
