= CycleBeads =

Visual tool used for family planning

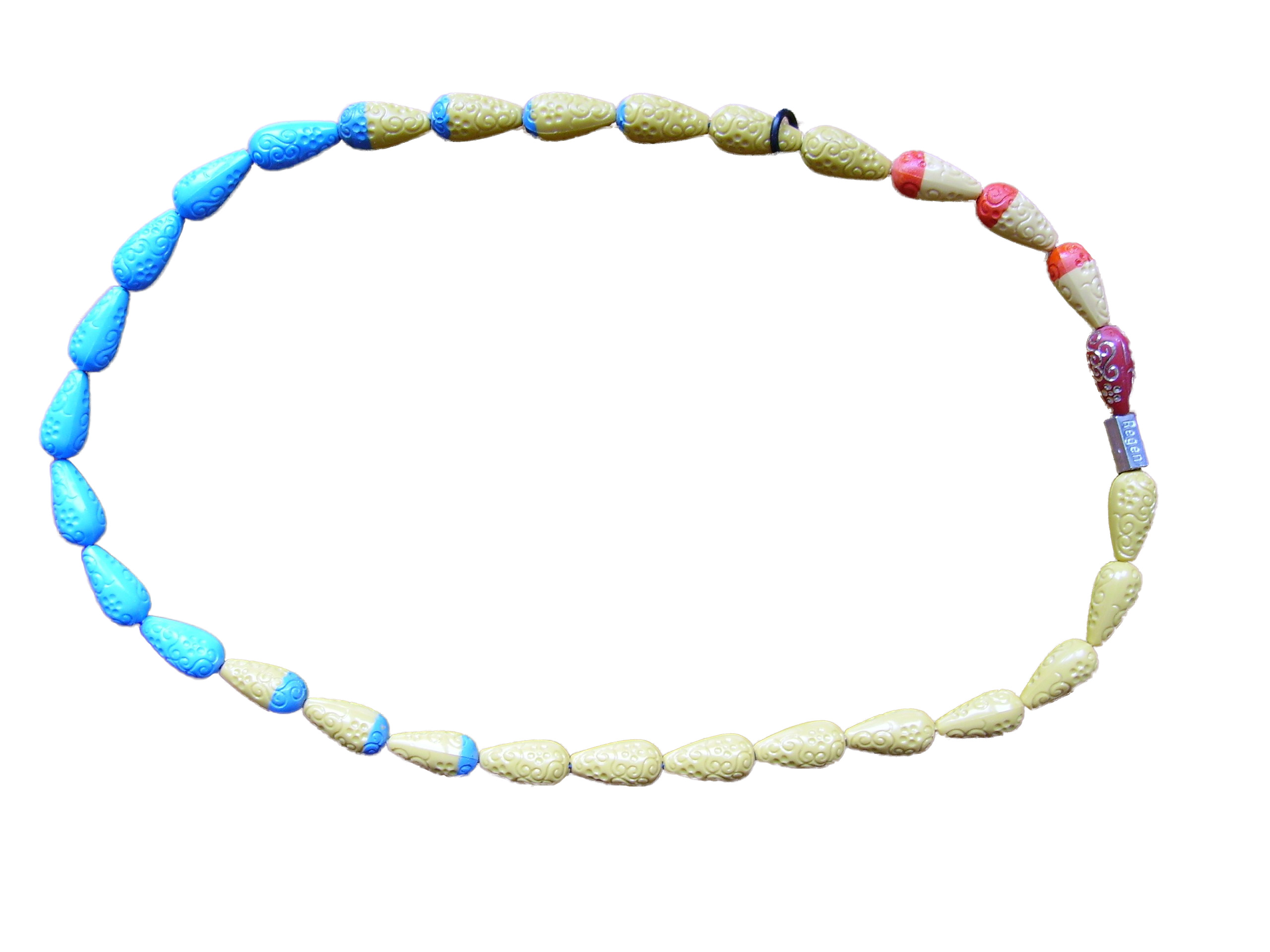
A CycleBeads birth control chain, used for a rough estimate of fertility based on days since menstruation

CycleBeads is a visual tool that was developed by the Institute for Reproductive Health at Georgetown University. This device helps women use the Standard Days Method, a fertility awareness-based family planning method. The sole manufacturer is a US for-profit company, Cycle Technologies.

The Standard Days Method is based on the fact that there is a fertile window during a woman's menstrual cycle which begins several days before ovulation and ends a few hours after ovulation. During this time a woman can become pregnant. The Standard Days Method identifies days 8-19 of cycle for women with cycles between 26 and 32 days long, as the potential fertile window. This formula is based on computer analysis of 7,500 menstrual cycles and takes into account cycle length, the timing of ovulation, the variation of the timing of ovulation from one cycle to the next, as well as the lifespan of the sperm and ovum. To prevent pregnancy using the Standard Days Method and CycleBeads, users avoid unprotected sex by using a condom or abstaining during days 8-19 of the cycle.

== How to Use ==
CycleBeads, a color-coded string of beads that represents the days of a woman's cycle, helps an individual use the Standard Days Method, by helping her track her cycle days. Starting the first day of her period, she moves a band to the red bead then to a new bead every day. The color of the bead lets her know if today is a day she is highly likely to be fertile or not. Couples use condoms or barrier methods to prevent pregnancy on fertile days.

An efficacy trial found that CycleBeads was more than 95% effective at preventing pregnancy with correct use and approximately 88% effective with typical use among women who reported recent cycles of 26–32 days. While this is similar or better than the efficacy of most other Natural Family Planning methods. its perfect use is significantly less effective than many other modern birth control methods and Long-acting reversible contraceptives.

Women can use CycleBeads to plan pregnancy as well. Couples target those days where the bead colour indicates fertility is highest for intercourse to conceive a child.

== Main Drawbacks ==
This method is not as effective for women who have cycles outside of the 26- to 32-day range. Women who are breastfeeding or have recently used contraceptive injections must wait before using CycleBeads. Many natural family planning methods require male involvement. Efficacy, like all birth control, is highly dependent on continuing correct use.

== Considerations for Family Planning Programs ==
CycleBeads can be included in a wide variety of programs and offered by different levels of providers without significant additional resources. It has the potential to expand contraceptive prevalence by bringing new users to family planning. The method involves men and which gives programs an opportunity to develop strategies for reaching men with a variety of reproductive health messages. CycleBeads are a low-cost, one-time purchase which can help address concerns about increasing costs for contraceptives.

== Additional Evidence ==
According to research studies, most women can learn to use CycleBeads in a single counseling session of about 20–30 minutes. Almost all women who choose to use CycleBeads do so because it is "natural" and does not have side effects. Follow up interviews with users and their partners found a high levels of satisfaction with the method among women and their partners.

== Origin ==
The original birth control necklace was invented in 1989 by the Austrian gynecologist Maria Hengstberger who developed this necklace together with local Ethiopian women and adapted it to their wishes and needs. The newest and certainly most understandable model of this necklace is called "Baby Necklace", since the beads of the days of highest fertility have the shape of a baby. In 1995 the Necklace was taken over by the "Pastoral of the Child" in Brazil for joint use and further development and passed on to the Institute for Reproductive Health (IRH) at Georgetown University, for scientific research. In the form of "CycleBeads", developed and patented by IRH, the necklace is the basis of the "Standard Days Method", which has been spread worldwide by IRH.
