= Kyusaku Ogino =

Japanese medical doctor (1882–1975)

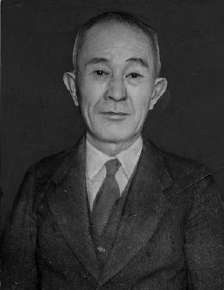
Ogino in 1924

Kyusaku Ogino (荻野 久作, Ogino Kyūsaku, 25 March 1882 – 1 January 1975) was a Japanese medical doctor specializing in obstetrics and gynecology.

His natural father's family name was Nakamura, but Kyusaku was adopted by the Ogino family in 1901.

Ogino studied infertility and developed a method to estimate the fertile period of the menstrual cycle based on the length of a woman's past cycles. This knowledge could be used by couples seeking pregnancy to time intercourse so as to maximize the chances of conception.

In 1930, John Smulders, Roman Catholic physician from the Netherlands, used this discovery to create a method for avoiding pregnancy. Smulders published his work with the Dutch Roman Catholic medical association, and this was the official Rhythm Method promoted over the next several decades. Ogino opposed the use of his method for contraception. He argued that its failure rate was too high: to promote it for contraception, despite the availability of other effective contraceptive methods, would result in many abortions from unwanted pregnancies. Despite this, the Rhythm Method of contraception is ironically referred to as the Ogino Method (オギノ式, ogino-shiki) in Japan. Babies born to parents using this method are known in France as "bébés Ogino."
