= Basal body temperature =

Lowest body temperature each day

Background
- Type: Fertility awareness
- First use: 1930s

Failure rates (first year)
- Perfect use: Unknown%
- Typical use: Unknown%

Usage
- Reversibility: Immediate
- User reminders: Dependent upon strict user adherence to methodology
- Clinic review: None

Advantages and disadvantages
- STI protection: No
- Period advantages: Prediction
- Weight gain: No
- Benefits: No side effects, can aid pregnancy achievement

Basal body temperature (BBT or BTP) is the lowest body temperature attained during rest (usually during sleep). It is usually estimated by a temperature measurement immediately after awakening and before any physical activity has been undertaken. This will lead to a somewhat higher value than the true BBT.

In women, ovulation causes a sustained increase of at least 0.2 °C (0.4 °F) in BBT. Monitoring BBTs is one way of estimating the day of ovulation. The tendency of a woman to have lower temperatures before ovulation, and higher temperatures afterwards, is known as a biphasic temperature pattern. Charting this pattern may be used as a component of fertility awareness. The BBT of men is comparable to the BBT of women in their follicular phase.

== Hormonal causes of biphasic patterns ==
The higher levels of estrogen present during the pre-ovulatory (follicular) phase of the menstrual cycle lower BBTs. The higher levels of progesterone released by the corpus luteum after ovulation raise BBTs. After ovulation, the temperature will be raised by at least 0.2 °C (0.4 °F), for at least 72 hours, compared to the previous six days.

== As a birth control method ==
=== While avoiding pregnancy ===
Charting of basal body temperatures is used in some methods of fertility awareness, such as the sympto-thermal method, and may be used to determine the onset of post-ovulatory infertility. When BBT alone is used to avoid a pregnancy, it is sometimes called the Temperature Rhythm method.

Basal body temperature alone is most effective at preventing pregnancy if the couple abstains from intercourse from the beginning of menstruation through the third day after the basal body temperature has risen. BBTs only show when ovulation has occurred; they do not predict ovulation. Sperm typically lasts for at least three days and can survive as long as a week, making prediction of ovulation several days in advance necessary for avoiding pregnancy.

=== Effectiveness ===
There is limited evidence about the effectiveness of fertility awareness family planning methods, some of which use basal body temperature as one component. About 24% of women who use any type of fertility awareness program become pregnant during the first year, compared to about 85% of sexually active women who are not trying to prevent a pregnancy.

The World Health Organization ranked fertility awareness methods, taken as a whole, as an "effective" method of preventing pregnancies. The WHO placed fertility awareness methods in the third tier of effectiveness, after "most effective" methods such as IUDs and "very effective" methods such as combined oral contraceptive pills.

== Trying to conceive ==
Couples that are trying to conceive can use BBT to determine when the opportunity for a pregnancy during this cycle has passed.

== As a diagnostic test ==
=== For infertility ===
Infertility due to lack of ovulation is common. BBT charts can be used to identify when and whether ovulation is taking place.

Regular menstrual cycles are often taken as evidence that a woman is ovulating normally, and irregular cycles is evidence she is not. However, many women with irregular cycles do ovulate normally, and some with regular cycles are actually anovulatory or have a luteal phase defect. Records of basal body temperature can be used to accurately determine if a woman is ovulating.

== For estimating the timing of childbirth ==
Calculating the expected due date for a pregnancy based upon the self-reported last menstrual period is less accurate than calculating it based upon either BBT or ultrasound.
