= Birth control in Africa =

Percentage of women using modern birth control as of 2010.: 6% 12% 18% 24% / 36% 48% 54% 60% / 66% 78% 86% No data

Access to safe and adequate sexual and reproductive healthcare constitutes part of the Universal Declaration of Human Rights, as upheld by the United Nations.

Most countries in Africa have some of the lowest rates of contraceptive use; highest maternal, infant, and child mortality rates; and highest fertility rates in the world. 45% of pregnancies that occur among adolescents in Africa are unplanned. It is estimated that 1 in 3 pregnancies that are unintended in Africa occur among girls between the ages of 15 and 19.

Public policies and cultural attitudes play a role in birth control prevalence. Approximately 30% of all women use birth control, although over half of all African women would use birth control if it were available. The main problems that prevent the use of birth control are limited availability (especially among young people, unmarried people, and the poor), high cost, limited choice of birth control methods, lack of knowledge on side-effects, spousal disapproval or other gender-based barriers, religious concerns, and bias from healthcare providers. There is evidence that increased use of family planning methods decreases maternal and infant mortality rates, improves quality of life for mothers, and stimulates economic development. However, according to CHASE AFRICA, a charitable organisation that promotes healthcare and education for women in Kenya and Uganda, approximately 1 in 5 women who want family planning cannot access it.

== Prevalence ==
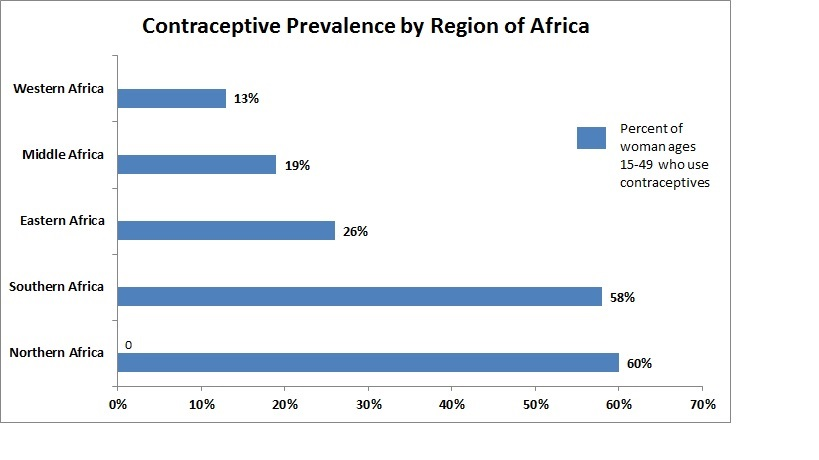
Notes: Estimates are based on the data available between 1998 and 2007. These percentages refer to women who are married or in a union. Northern Africa: Algeria, Egypt, Libya, Morocco, Sudan, Tunisia. Western Africa: Benin, Burkina Faso, Cape Verde, Côte d'Ivoire, Gambia, Ghana, Guinea, Guinea-Bissau, Liberia, Mali, Mauritania, Niger, Nigeria, Senegal, Sierra Leone, Togo. Eastern Africa: Burundi, Comoros, Djibouti, Eritrea, Ethiopia, Kenya, Madagascar, Malawi, Mauritius, Mozambique, Rwanda, Somalia, Tanzania, Uganda, Zambia, Zimbabwe. Middle Africa: Angola, Cameroon, Central African Republic, Chad, Congo, Democratic Republic of Congo, Gabon, São Tomé and Príncipe. Southern Africa: Botswana, Lesotho, Namibia, South Africa, Swaziland

In Africa, 24% of women of reproductive age have an unmet need for modern contraception. Low rates of contraceptive use are most prevalent in sub-Saharan African countries.

Research undertaken in 2007 led by Akinrinola Bankole found that correct and consistent condom use by those aged 14–19 was found to be 38% in Burkina Faso, 47% in Ghana, 20% in Malawi and 36% in Uganda. According to a 2008 study done by Ike Nwachukwu and Obasi in Nigeria, modern birth control methods were used by 30% of respondents.

In Uganda, NGOs are trying to make contraceptives more available in rural areas.

The Demographic Health Survey (DHS) of 2013 revealed that a mere 2% of sexually-active girls between the ages of 15 and 19 use contraceptives. 23% of the girls in this age group have children. In 2022, BMC Public Health conducted a study that examined contraceptive-use among school-going adolescents across nine sub-Saharan African countries. Not using condoms during sex was most notably associated with being younger, having limited to no parental support, being sexually inexperienced, or having multiple sexual partners at once. Although, across the nine countries, more than 50% of sexually-active participants had used a condom at their last sexual encounter. Over a third used other methods of contraceptive for their last sexual intercourse. The highest rate of contraceptive-use was found in those from Namibia, and the lowest prevalence was found to be in Tanzania. The study concluded that there remains a great need for substantial intervention into contraceptive-use.

Use of contraception is also reported to decline each year a young woman ages.

Namibia, with a contraception-use rate of 46% in 2006–07, has one of the highest rates of contraceptive-use in Africa. Senegal, with an overall rate of 8.7% in 2005, has one of the lowest.

In Sub-Saharan Africa, extreme poverty, lack of access to birth control, and restrictive abortion laws result in approximately 3% of women to have unsafe abortions.

Limited contraceptive-use contributes to an exponential rise in population across the continent. The United Nations has predicted that by 2050 the population will more than double.

== Factors contributing to prevalence ==
A growing population, limited access to contraception, limited availability in different contraceptive methods, perceived or actual cultural stigma and religious judgement, poor quality of sexual and reproductive healthcare, and gender-based barriers, each contribute to the high "unmet need" for contraception in Africa. There needs to be consistent and effective provisions of modern contraceptives for the improvement of family planning.

There is a correlation between parental support and guidance, and the sexual health and use of contraception in young women.

In Eastern Africa, the unmet need is attributed to socioeconomic variables, including the family planning program environment and reproductive behaviour models. Data collected in the late twentieth century, suggests that high fertility rates in Sub-Saharan African countries, compared to other developing countries, is due to "the inter-related factors of early childbearing, high-infant mortality, low education and contraceptive use, and persistence of high fertility-sustaining social customs."

Referring to family projects that are underway in the Democratic Republic of Congo, an advisor to the United Nations Population Fund, Frederick Okwayo, stated that "the logistics of providing care is difficult because of the bad infrastructure." A lack of infrastructure, resulting from minimal governmental funding and a limited number of health clinics in some areas, create prominent barriers to accessing birth control.

An analysis of birth rates and fertility in Ghana found that without effective contraception, "the total number of children a woman bears is principally a function of the age at which childbearing begins." The study finds that pregnancies which occur in childhood and adolescence can be prevented by contraceptive-use.

Some of the factors identified that prevented use of modern birth control methods in a 2008 study in Nigeria were "perceived negative health reaction, fear of unknown effects, cost, spouse's disapproval, religious belief and inadequate information." According to a study titled 'Equity Analysis: Identifying Who Benefits from Family Planning Programs', the main factors that contribute to the unavailability of family planning information and modern birth control methods are low education level, young age, and living in a rural area. A 1996 study that included couples in both urban and rural Kenya who did not want have a child, yet were not using birth control, found additional factors that limited birth control use to traditional practices, such as "naming relatives" and a preference for sons who can provide more financial security to parents as they age.

Until the 1990s, contraception and family planning were associated with fears of eugenic ideology and population control, which narrowed the scope of behavior-change communication and distribution of contraceptive devices.

Patriarchal ideologies that are fostered by traditional cultural and religious beliefs, and primarily undermine the worth of female autonomy and the validity of female agency, greatly contribute to a reduction of contraceptive-use.

Fatimata Sy, who directed the Ouagadougou Partnership that launched in 2011 to increase the use of modern contraception across Africa, explained that the biggest hindrances to the movement were religion, social and gender norms and cultural taboos.

Men are frequently cited as a major factor preventing adequate birth control access in Africa. They reinforce many societal and cultural ideologies that block women from choosing and accessing sexual and reproductive healthcare. Male adolescents were also among the highest of those who used no contraception during sexual intercourse.

John Magufuli, president of Tanzania from 2015 to 2021, strongly advised women to not use birth control or any other family planning method. He stated that those who do are "lazy" and "do not want to work hard to feed a large family". He also declared that women were not allowed to return to education after they had become pregnant, reinforcing a 1960s law that banned young mothers from attending state school education.

In the cities of Nairobi and Bungoma in Kenya, major barriers to contraceptive use revolve around sexual partners unable to agree on the contraceptive method and their reproductive intentions. Approximately 33% of wives in Nairobi and 50% of wives in Bungoma desired no more children, compared to 70% of husbands wanting around four or more children than their wives wanted.

A 2013 study in Kenya and Zambia shows a correlation between ante-natal care use and post-partum contraceptive use which suggests that contraceptive use could be increased by promoting ante-natal care services. A 1996 study in Zambia again cites the importance of educating both men and women and states that single mothers and teenagers should be the primary focus of birth control education. Of the 376 women recruited after giving birth at a hospital, 34% had previously used family planning, and 64% had used family planning a year after giving birth. Of the women who did not use family planning, 39% cited spousal disapproval as the reason. 84% of single mothers had never used family planning before and 56% of teenagers did not know anything about family planning. A 1996 Kenyan study suggests the need for modern contraception education that promotes quality of life over "traditional reproductive practices."

== Birth control methods ==
In most African countries, only a few types of birth control are offered, which makes finding a method that fits the reproductive needs of a couple or an individual difficult. Many African countries had low access scores on almost every method. In the 1999 ratings for 88 countries, 73% of countries offered condoms to at least half their population, 65% of countries offered the pill, 54% offered IUDs, 42% offered female sterilization, and 26% offered male sterilization. Low levels of condom use are cause for concern, particularly in the context of generalized epidemics in Sub-Saharan Africa. The use rate for injectable contraceptives increased from 2% to 8%, and from 8% to 26% in Sub-Saharan Africa, while the rate for condoms was 5%–7%. The least used method of contraception is male sterilization, with a rate of less than 3%. 6%–20% of women in Sub-Saharan Africa used injectable contraceptives covertly, a practice more common in areas where contraceptive prevalence was low, particularly rural areas.

== Cultural attitudes toward family planning ==
In Northern Ghana, payment of bridewealth in cows and sheep signifies the wife's obligation to bear children, which results in an ingrained expectation toward a woman's duty to reproduce. As a result, men often perceive contraceptive-use as an indicator of their wife's infidelity or promiscuity.

Child and forced marriages, a human rights breach that remains particularly high in sub-Saharan African countries, limit female autonomy and often result in a culture that prevents women and young girls from being in control of their reproductive health. The possibility that women may act independently, either toward healthcare or socially, is also regarded as a threat to the strong patriarchal tradition. Recently, however, attitudes toward child marriages have improved, particularly in Nigeria, with many discussing the social and emotional disadvantages this can cause.

According to a 1987 study by John Caldwell, large families are seen as socially favourable and infertility is viewed negatively. This can cause a paradoxical use in birth control, where it is used to increase birth intervals, rather than to limit family size.

Physical abuse and reprisals from the extended family pose substantial threats to women. A 1999 survey conducted in northern Ghana found that 51% of female and 43% of male respondents considered domestic violence to be justified if a wife used a contraceptive method without her husband's knowledge. Women feared that their husband's disapproval of family planning could lead to the withholding of affection or sex, and even lead to divorce.

In areas that have communal grazing areas or "tribal tenure," Danish economist Ester Boserup found that large families are desirable because more children means more productive capability. This would result in higher social status and increased wealth for the father.

Pragmatically, having more children decreases the mother's workload, and is deemed as an additional benefit for the urban African home. Boserup suggests that large families are regarded as indicators of a man's wealth and high social status. This is the opposite for the large majority in African countries, who live in rural areas or agricultural communities that have private-land ownership. For these communities, having a larger family can in fact be viewed negatively. Private landowners do not need to rely on financial support from children in old age or in crises because of the high profitability of their land. As such, opting for family planning can be less stigmatised.

In other sub-Saharan African cultures, spousal discussion of sexual matters is discouraged. Friends of family and in-laws are used by proxy for spouses to exchange ideas or issues relating to reproduction. Other forms of communication to convey sex-related messages include music, wearing specific waist beads, acting in a certain way, and preparing desired meals. A man may also use contraception as a nonverbal indicator of his feelings. Therefore, effective communication and reduced stigma between partners may improve family planning attitudes only when it is more efficient than, or augments the effectiveness of, other forms of communication.

== Effects ==
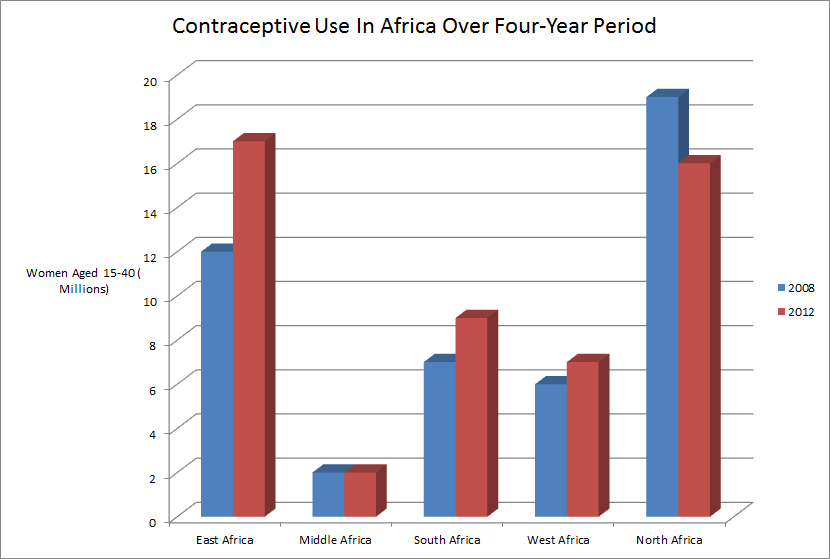
Tracking the change in contraception use of African women from 2008 to 2012

In 1992, the executive director of the United Nations International Children's Emergency Fund (UNICEF), James Grant, stated that "Family Planning could bring more benefits to more people at less cost than any other single technology now available to the human race."

Use of modern birth control methods has been shown to decrease the female fertility rate in Sub-Saharan Africa.

=== Health ===
Africa has the highest maternal death rate, which measures the death rate of women from pregnancy and childbirth. The maternal mortality ratio in sub-Saharan Africa is 1,006 maternal deaths per 100,000 live births. A study by Rebecca Baggaley et al. suggests that increasing access to safe abortion would reduce maternal mortality due to unsafe abortions in Ethiopia and Tanzania. Alexandra Alvergne et al. argue in their study, 'Fertility, parental investment, and the early adoption of modern contraception in rural Ethiopia', that an increase in usage of family planning increases birth spacing which consequently decreases infant mortality. However, there was no observed effect on overall child mortality, possibly due to a recent overall decrease in childhood death rates among both contraceptive users and non-users.

In nearly all African countries, having unprotected sex, especially at an early age, is associated with an increased risk of acquiring sexually transmitted diseases, most prolifically HIV/AIDS. In eastern and southern Africa, 1 in 4 adolescent girls and 1 in 5 adolescent boys between the ages of 15 and 19 tested positive for HIV in 2021-2022. Increasing condom use in Africa would decrease rates of HIV transmission.

=== Social ===
According to Stephen Gyimah, women who have their first child at a younger age are less likely to finish school and will be likely limited to low-paying career options. Research suggests that a desire to continue with their education is one of the largest reasons that women use birth control and terminate pregnancies.

Since birth control is not widely available, beginning a family at a young age is additionally correlated with a higher overall fertility rate. Alexandra Alvergne states that another benefit of longer birth intervals due to contraception use is an increase in parental investment and proportion of resources dedicated to each child.

Two notable reasons for married women opting to use birth control are to plan birth spacing and postpone pregnancies in order to achieve their desired family size.

=== Economic ===
An increase in the use of family planning results in economic improvements; women are more likely to stay in work and have the socio-economic foundations to support the development of their children. Family planning results in an estimated 140-600% return on investment due to a reduction in health care spending and the fostering of financial agency. A study titled 'The Economic Case for Birth Control in Underdeveloped Nations', published in 1967, argues that decreasing the birth rate in countries with high fertility levels is crucial to economic growth and that "one dollar used to slow population growth can be 100 times more effective in raising income per head than one dollar to expand output."

Since the majority of African countries have high fertility rates relative to the rest of the world, it is clear that most African countries have not undergone a demographic transition. In other parts of the world, there is evidence that economic growth increases after a country undergoes demographic transition. This is due to more women working, greater parental investment in children in terms of education and attention, and longer, more productive working life due to health improvements. Although other improvements in public health are necessary to fully undergo a demographic transition, it cannot occur without family planning. It is unclear, however, how exactly the demographic transition will affect society in sub-Saharan Africa.

Some believe that one economic downside to using birth control and preventing pregnancy is the possibility that parents will not have enough successful, living offspring who can support them in old age. This is a prominent concern among parents in Sub-Saharan African countries.

South Africa, Botswana, and Zimbabwe have successful family planning programs, but other central and southern African countries continue to encounter difficulties in achieving higher contraceptive prevalence and lower fertility rates. Socioeconomic class can be defined as an inequity in relation to mortality and morbidity. The disparity in the use of contraception between the upper and lower classes has remained the same despite overall improvements in socioeconomic status and expansion of family planning services.

== Change ==
=== Public policy ===
The BMC Public Health inquiry into the use of birth control methods among sexually-active adolescents surmised that to improve on overall contraceptive-use, "the development of country-specific sexual health education and youth-friendly sexual and reproductive health interventions that target risky adolescents and promote adolescent-parent effective communication" would be needed.

Recently, a new approach that promotes spousal discussion of contraception has been proposed as a policy strategy to narrow the gender gap in wanting to have children. Men are usually the decision makers on birth control use, and therefore should be the targeted audience of educational campaigns. Discussion between spouses is expected to increase contraceptive use. This is because a reason women cite for not using contraception is an expected concern of their husband's disapproval.

At the 1994 Cairo International Conference on Population and Development, an emphasis was made on human lives rather than statistics when considering the impacts of population increase, with a particular emphasis on improving healthcare and reproductive rights in sub-Saharan Africa. Recommendations were made to governments in countries throughout Africa to prioritise sexual and reproductive health services and make family planning universally accessible.

In 2000, the London Summit on Family Planning attempted to make modern contraceptive services accessible to an additional 120 million women in 69 of the world's poorest countries by the year 2020. The summit hoped to eradicate discrimination or coercion against girls who seek contraceptives.

The United Nations created the 'Every Woman Every Child' initiative in 2010 to assess the progress toward meeting women's contraceptive needs and modern family planning services. Setting their initiative through goals of expected increases in usage of modern contraceptive methods, acts as an indicator of the effectiveness of these interventions.

The World Health Organization actively encourages sexual and reproductive health rights for all women and girls, and recognises a need for effective, and sustainable policies or interventions which can produce this. The United Nations, through its Sustainable Development Goals, has set a goal of ensuring universal access to sexual and reproductive health care services (particularly in the form of family planning and birth control) and strives to implement these within the health policies and programmes of members states by 2030. 54 African countries are part of the United Nations, including Burkina Faso, Ghana and Rwanda.

One of the Millennium Development Goals is improving maternal health. In developing countries, the maternal mortality rate is fifteen times higher than in the developed regions. The Maternal Health Initiative called for countries to reduce their maternal mortality rate by three quarters by 2015. Eritrea is one of the four African countries to successfully achieve some or most of the Millennium Development Goals, resulting in a rate of less than 350 deaths per 100,000 births.

==== Ethiopia ====
In recent years, the Government of Ethiopia has worked hard to improve healthcare in line with the United Nations' Sustainable Development Goals. It has been reported that by prioritising the health, education and socio-economic prospects of their citizens, there has been a significant reduction in the country's birth rate. The United States government, through the form of USAID, has helped strengthen family health in the country, in the form of "quality reproductive, maternal, newborn, child, and adolescent health services".

==== Rwanda ====
After the 1994 Rwandan genocide, the country's healthcare system underwent major changes that led to a 60% increase in contraceptive-use.

A start-up called Kasha allows citizens in Rwandan villages to order condoms and contraceptives via text message and delivers them with a moped.

==== Niger ====
There has been wide media support in the promotion of contraceptive-use in Niger. Athletes, celebrities, and prominent political figures have used their status to speak out on, and encourage the use of, contraception in the country.

L'Association des Jeunes Filles pour la Santé de la Reproduction (English: The Girls' Association for Reproductive Health) was established in 2020 to create campaigns and workshops raising awareness and education for girls and women in Niger. Kadiatou Idani, the president of the group, believes "[r]eproductive health is a taboo subject. But girls have sexual and reproductive rights, [and] they need to know about them."

==== Burkina Faso ====
In 2016, Burkina Faso implemented a national free healthcare policy for women and children under 5. This involved the free distribution of contraceptives.

Between 2013 and 2018 government expenditure on healthcare, particularly sexual and reproductive healthcare, increased by 30%.

==== Tanzania ====
The first female president of Tanzania, Samia Suluhi Hassan, has made a pledge to improve access to birth control in the country. Hassan believes that birth control access will help improve Tanzania's economic prospects, and urges women to want and to have less children.

=== Improvements ===
Contraceptive use among women in Sub-Saharan Africa has risen from approximately 5% in 1991 to approximately 30% in 2006.

In the 2020 Family Planning report (FP2020), written by the United Nations, it stated that between 2012-2020 there was a 66% increase in the number of women and girls who used modern contraception. The report also informed that in Central and West Africa women who use birth control as much as doubled, and in Eastern and Southern Africa, the increase was up to 70%.

Gyimah reports that fertility rates are declining in some African countries, particularly Kenya, Botswana, Zimbabwe, and Ghana. The decrease in fertility rates in Ghana is largely attributed to investment in education that has caused an increase in age at first birth and improved job opportunities for women.

== See also ==
- Women in Niger
- Women in Nigeria
- Women in Tanzania
- Feminism
- Family planning
- Reproductive rights
