= Medical eligibility criteria for contraceptive use =

Set of guidelines on contraceptive use

Contraception is typically considered safer than pregnancy, especially in patients with medical conditions such as high blood pressure or diabetes. However, people with medical conditions may need to have contraceptive options tailored around their specific needs. Resources exist for patients and providers to help tailor methods. One example of a resource is the Medical Eligibility Criteria for Contraceptive Use (MEC), which exists in multiple formats.

== Background ==
In 1996, the World Health Organization created a set of guidelines called "medical eligibility criteria for contraceptive use" for family planning and reproductive health programs and providers in order to guide provision of contraceptive care worldwide. The guidelines are based on systematic reviews of the medical literature and expert opinion where evidence is lacking. The intent of these recommendations was to allow public health programs in individual countries to tailor contraceptive safety guidance to their particular populations. Subsequently, in 2010, the Centers for Disease Control and Prevention created recommendations for contraceptive provision in the United States. These references may be used by medical providers as well as patients to assess their eligibility to use individual contraceptives like birth control pills, intrauterine devices, and implants.

== Classification system ==
The MEC categorizes methods using a numerical system. Category 1 conditions have no restrictions on use of a contraceptive method. Category 2 indicates method use may require closer follow-up. For a Category 3 condition, use of that method "usually is not recommended unless other more appropriate methods are not available or acceptable. The severity of the condition and the availability, practicality, and acceptability of alternative methods should be considered, and careful follow-up is required". Category 4 conditions have an unacceptable level of risk if the method is used.

== Format ==
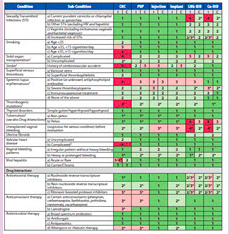
A chart summarizes the CDC recommendations regarding contraceptive use with medical conditions. (Full link under External links)

Medical Eligibility Criteria exist in multiple formats described below to encourage greater use and access by medical professionals.

Print version: The full print document of the US Medical Eligibility Criteria is intended to describe in further detail the medical evidence for each recommendation.

Summary chart: A summary chart that is color coded, with green used for category 1 and 2 methods and pink/red used for category 3 and 4 methods, exists to provide reference to select methods and their categories.

Summary wheel: A summary wheel exists that details categories in a slightly different format than the summary chart.

App: A free app has been created by the CDC to offer easier access to the guidelines for medical providers.
