= Misinformation related to birth control =

False or misleading information on birth control

Misinformation related to birth control pertains to incorrect or misleading information surrounding birth control and its medical, legal and societal implications. This misinformation is mostly related to contraceptive methods that do not contain basis in science. Belief in this misinformation can deter people from using effective solutions in favor of solutions that are entirely ineffective and, in some cases, harmful to health.

== Reasons for birth control myths ==
Some reasons that individuals may believe in birth control myths include:

- Naturalness bias. As a form of automatic (unconscious) cognitive bias, people may psychologically view products or methods that are branded as more "natural" as always also being "linked to purity and safety". This is not necessarily a correct type of assumption, for various reasons. For example, entirely natural substances such as bacteria or cyanide can be deadly.
- Exaggerated or false news media reports, combined with a lack of access to effective educational programs.
- Uncertain, fearful, or anxious thought processes and emotions. For some individuals, these may be encouraged by some online testimonials that contain excessive fearmongering about hormonal birth control. These may include posts on social media platforms like TikTok, that spread birth control myths. A 2025 study found that most such videos are inaccurate, many consisted of anecdotes, and 90 percent of the video creators lacked a medical background. Viewers might not be shown more accurate advice, due to a social media algorithm. The intimate presentation of a social media video may feel relatively authentic, though social media influencers "often make money from posts 'sponsored' by various companies". By comparison, licensed medical doctors are liable under legal statutes (such as the Anti-Kickback Statute). Though doctors attempt to provide patient autonomy and informed consent, there may also be a feeling of medical autonomy with social media videos. However, creators without medical credentials may suggest less effective birth control methods that are more likely to fail and cause an unintended pregnancy.
- Insufficient contraceptive counseling. Some individuals may not have had their concerns initially addressed by medical providers, or may not have had access to adequate information.

== Common myths ==
=== Purported adverse side effects ===
Claim	Refutation
Increased sexually transmitted infection (STI) risk.	Some forms of birth control, namely condoms and dental dams, can prevent the transmission of STIs by providing a barrier for skin to skin contact and fluid exchange. Some forms of hormonal birth control, such as the pill, prevent pregnancy but do not prevent the spread of STIs. The pill has been shown preliminarily to increase the chances of certain types of STI transmission slightly, while lowering the risk of spread of others.
Fertility problems.	Research shows that both long and short term birth control pills do not affect the future ability to have children. Individuals with IUDs can get pregnant after the IUD is removed. Fertility declines with age, and it has no significant effect on use of birth control methods. The body's hormonal balance typically restores to regular, pre-pill levels within a few cycles after discontinuing the pill.
Pelvic inflammatory disease causation.	The risk of developing pelvic inflammatory disease following the insertion of an IUD has been proven to be very low. IUDs are considered amongst the safest and most effective forms of birth control.
Libido and/or sexual attraction impacts.	While hormonal birth control such as the pill may impact libido, most people taking birth control won't experience any change. For the small percentage that do, some may experienced decreased libido, while others may experience increased libido. Studies with larger sample sizes and more rigorous methodologies found no change in preference for masculine or feminine faces as a result of birth control pills. Earlier studies had small sample sizes, and failed to replicate in later research.
Explosion of testicles, from male birth control.	The false claim originates from a satire website.
Stroke or blood clots.	While birth control pills, namely those containing estrogen, have been shown to increase the risk of blood clots, this increase is small—at most 10 in 10,000 people per year develop blood clots from being on birth control pills. Women with a history of blood clots are at much higher risk and should consult a doctor. Individuals with uncontrolled high blood pressure, lupus, migraines with aura or depression needing further monitoring are not given birth control pills containing combination hormones because it increases their chances of getting a stroke or blood clots elsewhere in the body. In that case, an IUD is a better choice.
Impacts on cancer risk.	Birth control pills actually decrease the chance of getting endometrial, ovarian and colon cancer.
Weight loss or gain.	Studies have shown that the effect of birth control pills on weight gain is relatively small or nil. Birth control pills can cause some water retention, possibly leading to an increase of about two or three pounds. The progesterone components of the pill can make some people more hungry, leading to weight gain.
Effects on depression symptoms, mood, and premenstrual symptoms.	Harvard Medical School says that the risk of depression from birth control is "small but real", affecting just "2.2 out of 100 women who used hormonal birth control". The risk decreases with age. Some doctors suggest that the balance of different risks must be considered since, e.g. "intimate partner violence is linked to depression, and an unwanted pregnancy may be further detrimental to the woman's health and well-being." The American Medical Association says that women prescribed with birth control should be adequately monitored for mood changes, however one "of the benefits of birth-control pills is they decrease premenstrual dysphoric disorder". Some research finds birth control can actually reduce depression under the right circumstances. A 2025 study said that length of use matters, and each additional year of birth control use decreased depression risk further.

=== Menstrual cycles/maternity ===
Claim	Refutation
Women are only fertile one day of the month.	While women's cycles are generally regular, hormones involved in the menstrual cycle can be impacted by a number of factors, including medication and stress. This can cause ovulation to happen on a different day than expected, or for more than one day per month, resulting in fertile days that a woman may not anticipate even if actively tracking her cycle.
Women can't get pregnant right after their period.	Although ovulation typically occurs around 10–16 days before the next period, various factors can cause early ovulation in any given cycle; some women also have naturally short ovulation cycles, making them more likely to get pregnant closer to the end of their period.
Breastfeeding prevents pregnancy.	Breastfeeding is shown to help prevent ovulation in certain circumstances: the baby is younger than 6 months old; breastfeeding happens at least every four hours during the day and every six hours overnight; the woman is currently not having her period. While adhering strictly to these conditions shows success rates similar to hormonal birth control, they are difficult to adhere to and may not be practical for many women.

=== Sexual practices ===
Claim	Refutation
If a woman doesn't orgasm, she can't get pregnant.	Women ovulate each month as part of their regular menstrual cycle. Pregnancy occurs when a sperm fertilizes an egg that has been released in ovulation. This happens regardless of whether a woman has an orgasm.
If a woman douches after sex, she won't get pregnant.	Douching is washing out the vagina with fluids. It does not prevent pregnancy and is often advised against more generally by doctors.
A woman won't get pregnant if she has sex standing up or is on top.	Sperm is able to move up the cervical canal regardless of the position the woman is in during sex.
Plastic wrap or a balloon (etc.) can be acceptable substitutes for a condom.	Plastic wrap and balloons, other than not being designed for the shape of a penis, are not durable and may not serve as an effective barrier.
A woman won't get pregnant if a man pulls out before ejaculation.	While more effective than no birth control at all, pulling out before ejaculation is less effective than other birth control methods—approximately one in five people who rely on this method will get pregnant.
A woman can't get pregnant if it is her first time having sex.	The number of times a woman has had sex has no bearing on whether or not she can become pregnant—a woman can become pregnant the first time she has sex.
A woman won't get pregnant if she takes a shower or urinates after sex.	While urinating after sex may help prevent infections like UTIs, it will not prevent pregnancy.

=== Substances erroneously believed to be contraceptive ===
Claim	Refutation
Various vaccines, including those for tetanus, COVID-19, smallpox, etc. False claims about fertility have been made.	No vaccines have been found to be associated with infertility.
Plants, such as smartweed, wild yam, Pennroyal, Black Cohosh, Angelica, papaya, neem, asafoetida, figs and ginger.	None of these plants have been found to be beneficial for achieving contraception.

=== Misconceptions and myths around how birth control works ===
Claim	Refutation
Birth control causes abortions.	Though false, belief in this misconception has caused reduced access to birth control. Birth control is prevention, not interruption of pregnancy. However, between 2022 and 2024, a number of lawmakers across the United States publicized claims that IUDs and morning-after pills cause abortions and should therefore not be funded by taxpayer money. In 2022, a group of conservative, anti-abortion Missouri lawmakers attempted to stop their state's Medicaid from paying for emergency contraceptives and IUDs on these grounds. In February 2024, Oklahoma lawmakers proposed a bill to ban the morning-after pill and some IUDs. In May 2024, Virginia Governor Glenn Youngkin vetoed a bill protecting access to contraception, citing that some Virginians believed contraception causes abortions and thus protecting access would intrude on their religious freedoms. These false assertions and the publicity surrounding them have amounted to barriers to access to birth control–in the 13 states in the United States that had total abortion bans at the end of 2024, many women believe they can no longer access some forms of birth control. A survey in 2023 found that almost half of women in states where abortion is fully banned believe Plan B is illegal in their states.
Birth control pills are effective immediately after taking the initial dose(s).	Different types of pills have different windows for when efficacy begins, though none are immediately effective after the initial dose.
IUDs cannot or should not be used prior to having had a baby.	IUDs are completely safe to use even in individuals who have never been pregnant before.
Antibiotics impact the efficacy of birth control pills.	Except for a tuberculosis drug Rifampicin, antibiotics generally do not decrease the efficacy of birth control pills.
