= Birth control =

Prevention of human pregnancy

Video explaining how to prevent unwanted pregnancy

Birth control, also known as contraception, anticonception, and fertility control, is the use of methods or devices to prevent pregnancy. Birth control has been used since ancient times, but effective and safe methods of birth control only became available in the 20th century. Planning, making available, and using human birth control is called family planning. Some cultures limit or discourage access to birth control because they consider it to be morally, religiously, or politically undesirable.

The World Health Organization and United States Centers for Disease Control and Prevention provide guidance on the safety of birth control methods among women with specific medical conditions. The most effective methods of birth control are sterilization by means of vasectomy in males and tubal ligation in females, intrauterine devices (IUDs), and implantable birth control. This is followed by a number of hormone-based methods including contraceptive pills, patches, vaginal rings, and injections. Less effective methods include physical barriers such as condoms, diaphragms and fertility awareness methods. The least effective methods are spermicides and withdrawal by the male before ejaculation. Sterilization, while highly effective, is not usually reversible; all other methods are reversible, most immediately upon stopping them. Safe sex practices, such as with the use of condoms or female condoms, can also help prevent sexually transmitted infections. Other birth control methods do not protect against sexually transmitted infections. Emergency birth control can prevent pregnancy if taken within 72 to 120 hours after unprotected sex. Some argue not having sex is also a form of birth control, but abstinence-only sex education may increase teenage pregnancies if offered without birth control education, due to non-compliance.

In teenagers, pregnancies are at greater risk of poor outcomes. Comprehensive sex education and access to birth control decreases the rate of unintended pregnancies in this age group. While all forms of birth control can generally be used by young people, long-acting reversible birth control such as implants, IUDs, or vaginal rings are more successful in reducing rates of teenage pregnancy. After the delivery of a child, a woman who is not exclusively breastfeeding may become pregnant again after as few as four to six weeks. Some methods of birth control can be started immediately following the birth, while others require a delay of up to six months. In women who are breastfeeding, progestin-only methods are preferred over combined oral birth control pills. In women who have reached menopause, it is recommended that birth control be continued for one year after the last menstrual period.

About 222 million women who want to avoid pregnancy in developing countries are not using a modern birth control method. Birth control use in developing countries has decreased the number of deaths during or around the time of pregnancy by 40% (about 270,000 deaths prevented in 2008) and could prevent 70% if the full demand for birth control were met. By lengthening the time between pregnancies, birth control can improve adult women's delivery outcomes and the survival of their children. In the developing world, women's earnings, assets, and weight, as well as their children's schooling and health, all improve with greater access to birth control. Birth control increases economic growth because of fewer dependent children, more women participating in the paid workforce outside the home, and/or less use of scarce resources.

== Methods ==
Chance of pregnancy during first year of use
Method	Typical use	Perfect use
No birth control	85%	85%
Combination pill	9%	0.3%
Progestogen-only pill	13%	1.1%
Sterilization (female)	0.5%	0.5%
Sterilization (male)	0.15%	0.1%
Condom (female)	21%	5%
Condom (male)	18%	2%
Copper IUD	0.8%	0.6%
Hormonal IUD	0.2%	0.2%
Patch	9%	0.3%
Vaginal ring	9%	0.3%
MPA shot	6%	0.2%
Implant	0.05%	0.05%
Diaphragm and spermicide	12%	6%
Fertility awareness	24%	0.4–5%
Withdrawal	22%	4%
Lactational amenorrhea method (6 months failure rate)	0–7.5%	<2%

Birth control methods include barrier methods, hormonal birth control, intrauterine devices (IUDs), sterilization, and behavioral methods. They are used before or during sex, while emergency contraceptives are effective for up to five days after sex. Effectiveness is generally expressed as the percentage of women who become pregnant using a given method during the first year, and sometimes as a lifetime failure rate among methods with high effectiveness, such as tubal ligation.

Birth control methods can be divided into: male contraception and female contraception. Common male contraceptives are withdrawal, condoms, and vasectomy. Female contraceptive options include contraceptive pills (combination and progestin-only pill), hormonal or non-hormonal IUD, patch, vaginal ring, diaphragm, shot, implant, fertility awareness, and tubal ligation.

The most effective methods are long-acting and do not require ongoing health care visits. Surgical sterilization, implantable hormones, and intrauterine devices all have first-year failure rates of less than 1%. Hormonal contraceptive pills, patches or vaginal rings, and the lactational amenorrhea method (LAM), if adhered to strictly, can also have first-year (or for LAM, first-6-month) failure rates of less than 1%. With typical use, first-year failure rates are considerably higher, at 9%, due to inconsistent use. Other methods, such as condoms, diaphragms, and spermicides, have higher first-year failure rates even with perfect usage. The American Academy of Pediatrics recommends long acting reversible birth control as first line for young individuals.

While all methods of birth control have some potential adverse effects, the risk is less than that of pregnancy. After stopping or removing many methods of birth control, including oral contraceptives, IUDs, implants and injections, the rate of pregnancy during the subsequent year is the same as for those who used no birth control.

For individuals with specific health problems, certain forms of birth control may require further investigations. For women who are otherwise healthy, many methods of birth control should not require a medical exam—including birth control pills, injectable or implantable birth control, and condoms. For example, a pelvic exam, breast exam, or blood test before starting birth control pills does not appear to affect outcomes. In 2009, the World Health Organization (WHO) published a detailed list of medical eligibility criteria for each type of birth control.

=== Hormonal ===
Hormonal contraception is available in several different forms, including oral pills, implants under the skin, injections, patches, IUDs and a vaginal ring. They are currently available only for women, although hormonal contraceptives for men have been and are being clinically tested. There are two types of oral birth control pills, the combined oral contraceptive pills (which contain both estrogen and a progestin) and the progestogen-only pills (sometimes called minipills). If either is taken during pregnancy, they do not increase the risk of miscarriage nor cause birth defects. Both types of birth control pills prevent fertilization mainly by inhibiting ovulation and thickening cervical mucus. They may also change the lining of the uterus and thus decrease implantation. Their effectiveness depends on the user's adherence to taking the pills.

Combined hormonal contraceptives are associated with a slightly increased risk of venous and arterial blood clots. Venous clots, on average, increase from 2.8 to 9.8 per 10,000 women years which is still less than that associated with pregnancy. Due to this risk, they are not recommended in women over 35 years of age who continue to smoke. Due to the increased risk, they are included in decision tools such as the DASH score and PERC rule used to predict the risk of blood clots.

The effect on sexual drive is varied, with an increase or decrease in some but with no effect in most. Combined oral contraceptives reduce the risk of ovarian cancer and endometrial cancer and do not change the risk of breast cancer. They often reduce menstrual bleeding and painful menstruation cramps. The lower doses of estrogen released from the vaginal ring may reduce the risk of breast tenderness, nausea, and headache associated with higher dose estrogen products.

Progestin-only pills, injections, and intrauterine devices are not associated with an increased risk of blood clots and may be used by women with a history of blood clots in their veins. In those with a history of arterial blood clots, non-hormonal birth control or a progestin-only method other than the injectable version should be used. Progestin-only pills may improve menstrual symptoms and can be used by breastfeeding women as they do not affect milk production. Irregular bleeding may occur with progestin-only methods, with some users reporting no periods. The progestins drospirenone and desogestrel minimize the androgenic side effects but increase the risks of blood clots and are thus not the first line. The perfect use first-year failure rate of injectable progestin is 0.2%; the typical use first failure rate is 6%.

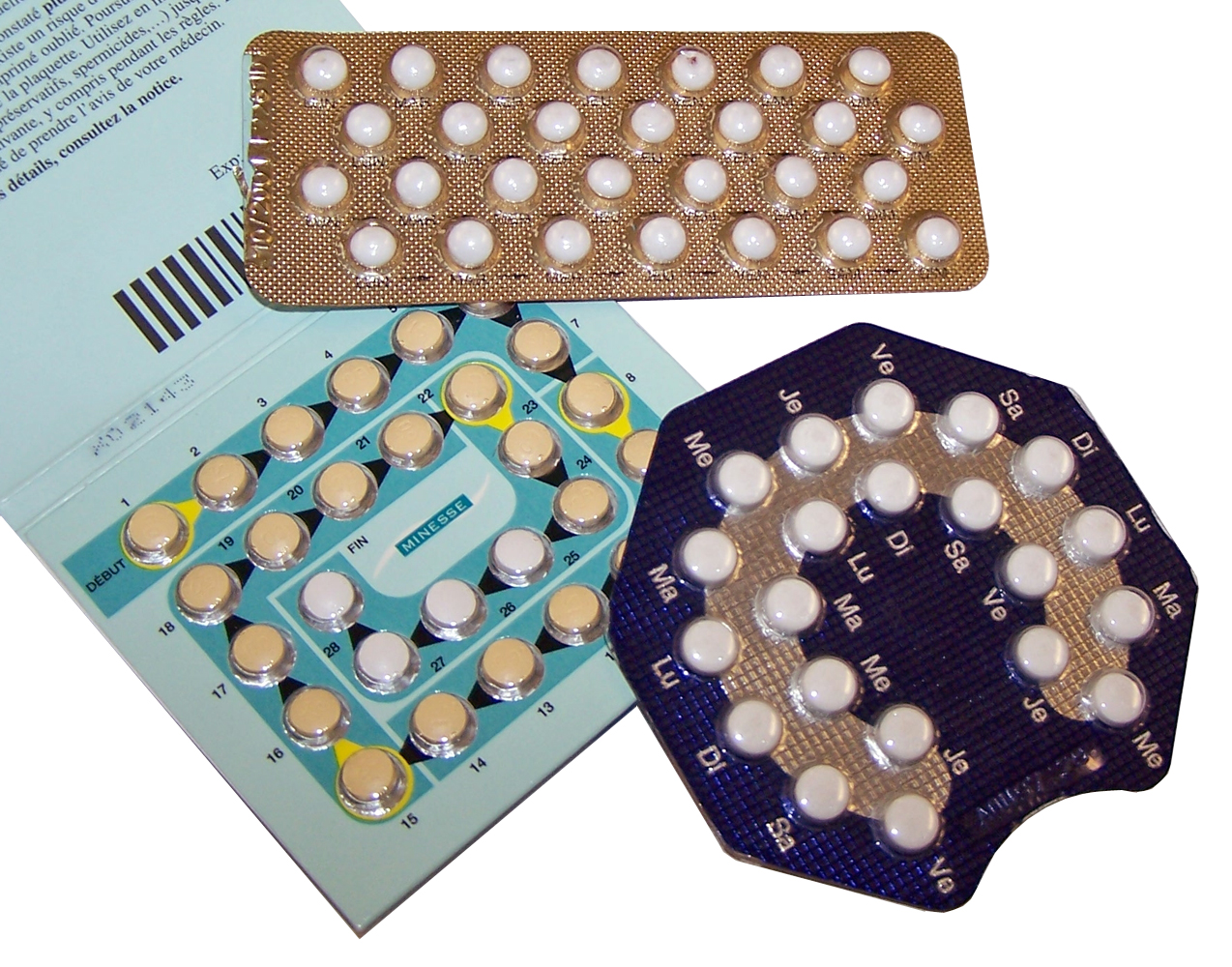
Three varieties of birth control pills in calendar-oriented packaging

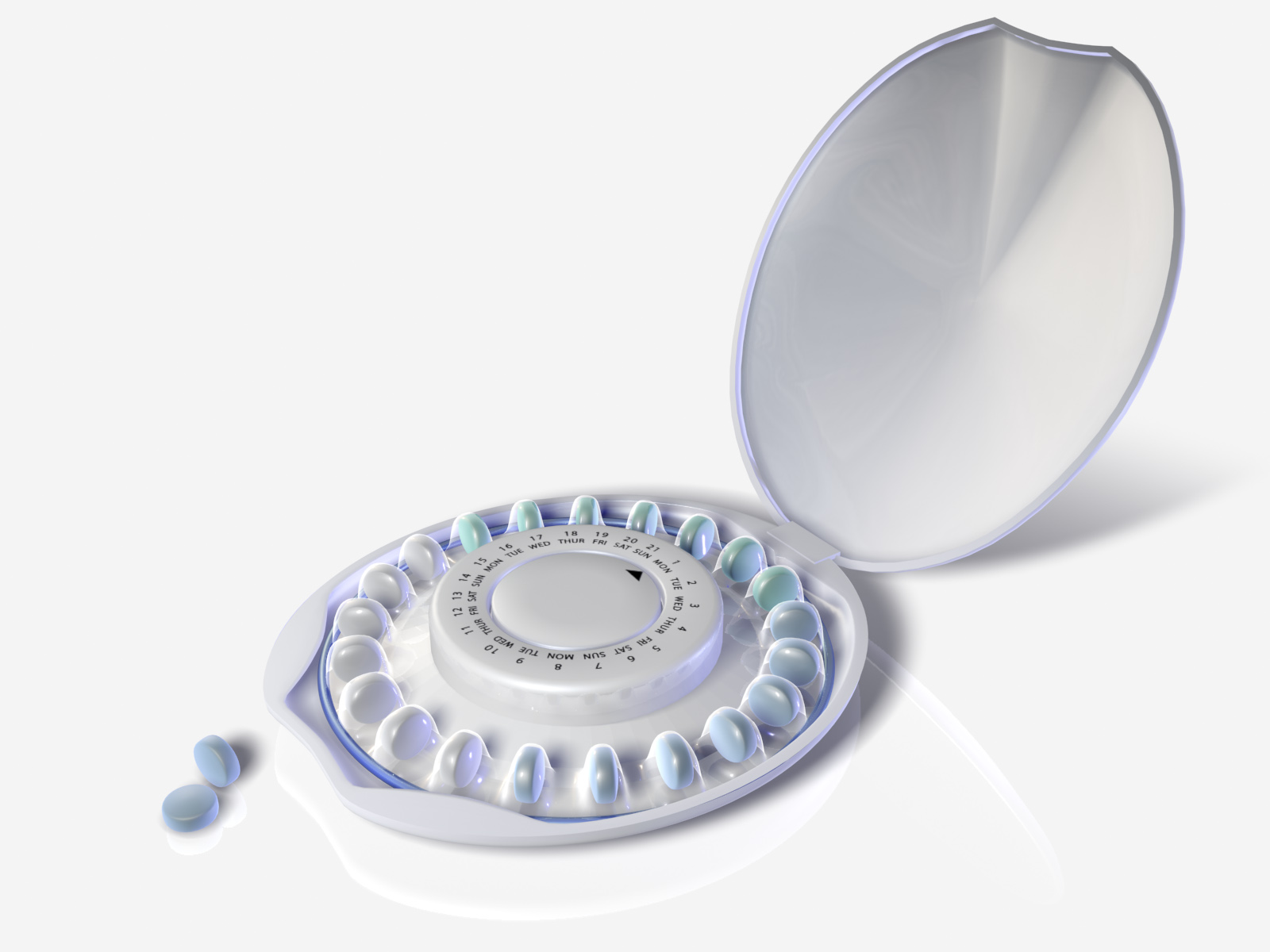
Birth control pills

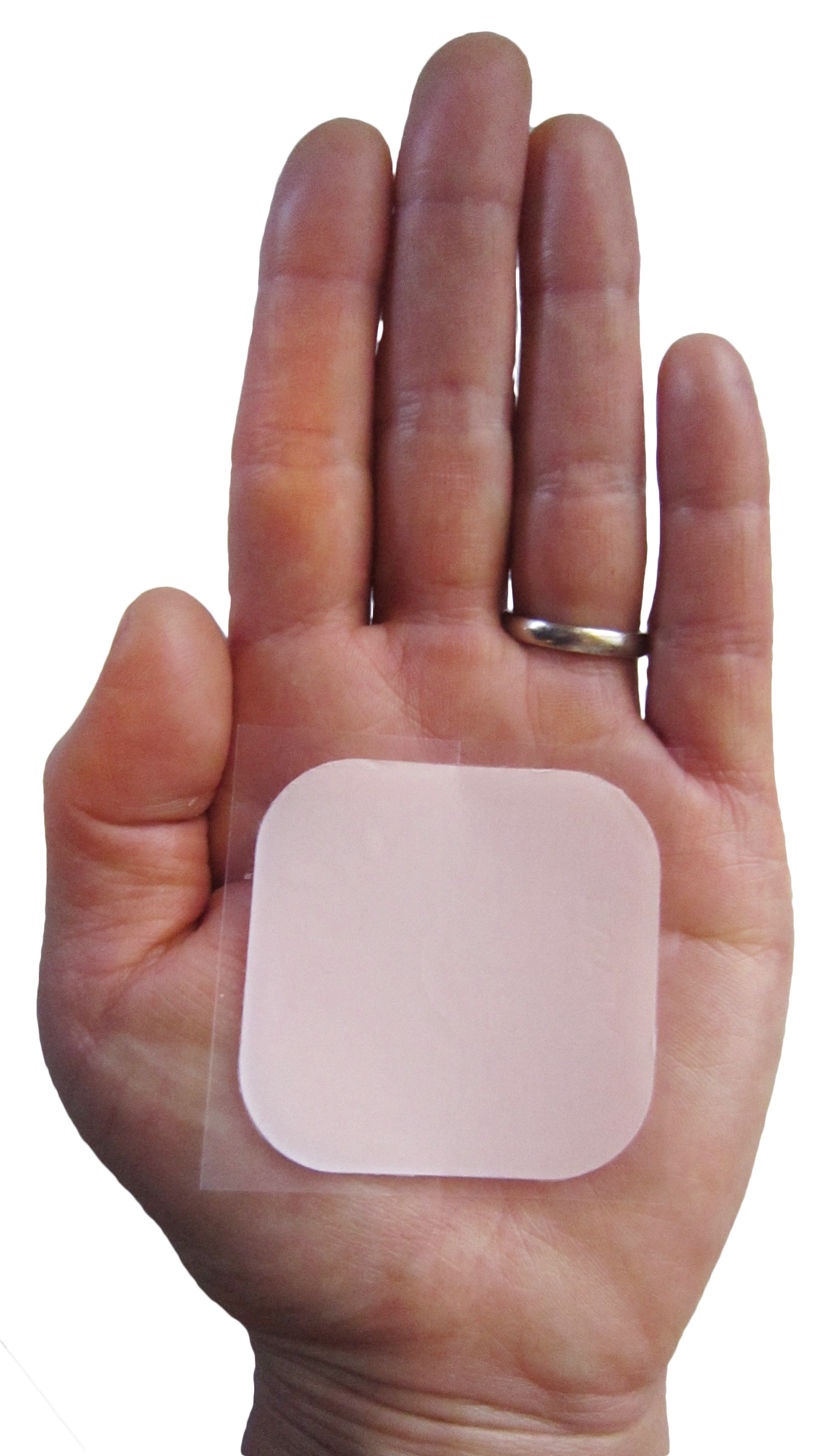
A transdermal contraceptive patch

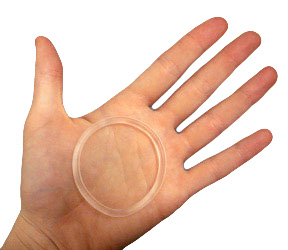
A NuvaRing vaginal ring

=== Barrier ===
Barrier contraceptives are devices that attempt to prevent pregnancy by physically preventing sperm from entering the uterus. They include male condoms, female condoms, cervical caps, diaphragms, and contraceptive sponges with spermicide.

Globally, condoms are the most common method of birth control. Male condoms are put on a man's erect penis and physically block ejaculated sperm from entering the body of a sexual partner. Modern condoms are most often made from latex, but some are made from other materials such as polyurethane, or lamb's intestine. Female condoms are also available, most often made of nitrile, latex or polyurethane. Male condoms have the advantage of being inexpensive, easy to use, and have few adverse effects. Making condoms available to teenagers does not appear to affect the age of onset of sexual activity or its frequency. In Japan, about 80% of couples who are using birth control use condoms, while in Germany this number is about 25%, and in the United States it is 18%.

Male condoms and the diaphragm with spermicide have typical use first-year failure rates of 18% and 12%, respectively. With perfect use, condoms are more effective with a 2% first-year failure rate versus a 6% first-year rate with the diaphragm. Condoms have the additional benefit of helping to prevent the spread of some sexually transmitted infections, such as HIV/AIDS; however, condoms made from animal intestines do not.

Contraceptive sponges combine a barrier with a spermicide. Like diaphragms, they are inserted vaginally before intercourse and must be placed over the cervix to be effective. Typical failure rates during the first year depend on whether or not a woman has previously given birth, being 24% in those who have and 12% in those who have not. The sponge can be inserted up to 24 hours before intercourse and must be left in place for at least six hours afterward. Allergic reactions and more severe adverse effects such as toxic shock syndrome have been reported.

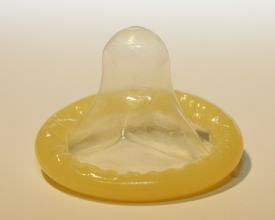
A rolled-up male condom.

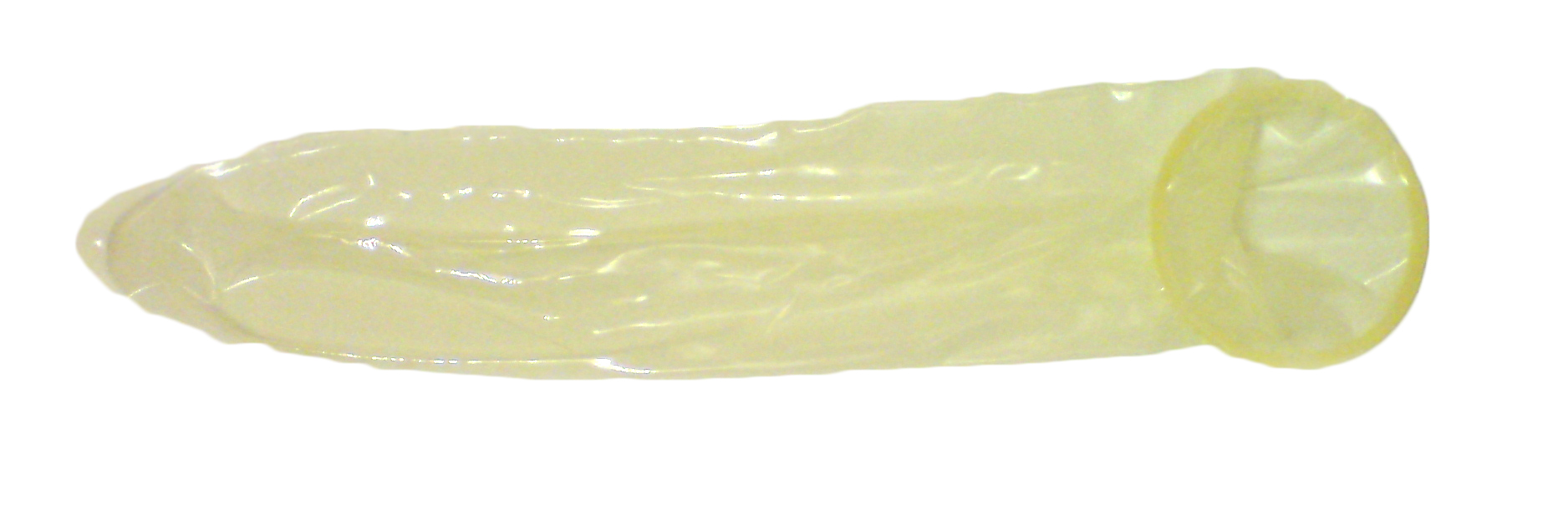
An unrolled male latex condom

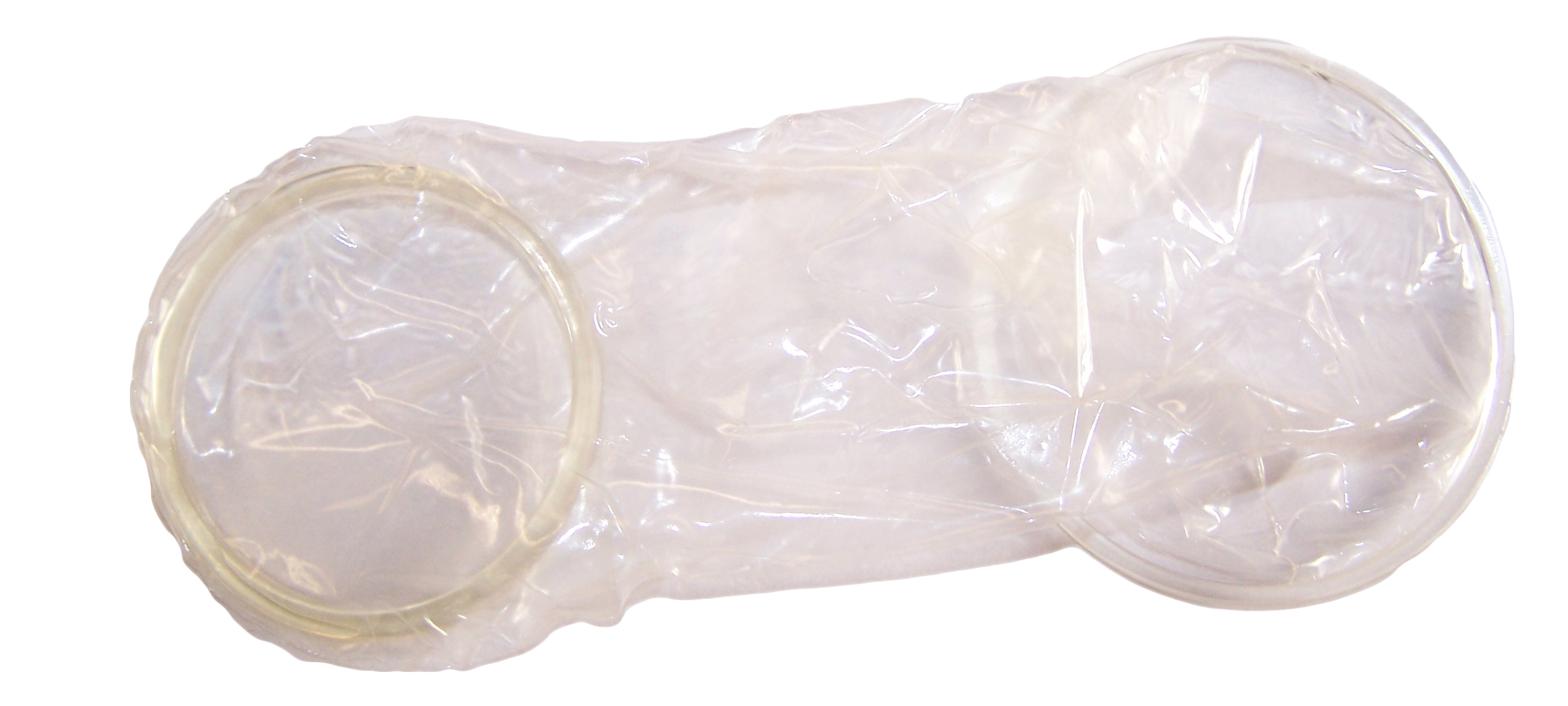
A polyurethane female condom

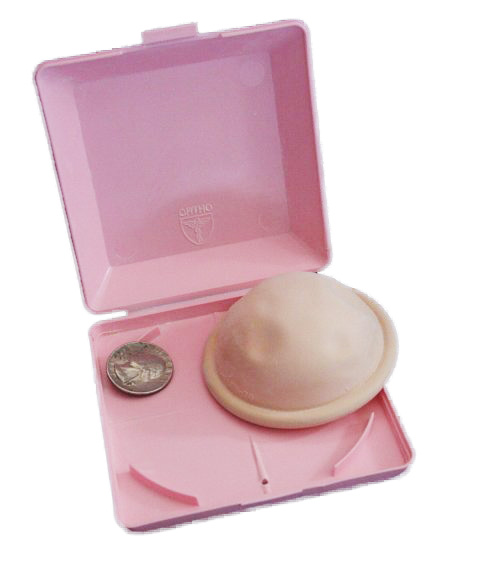
A diaphragm vaginal-cervical barrier, in its case with a quarter U.S. coin.

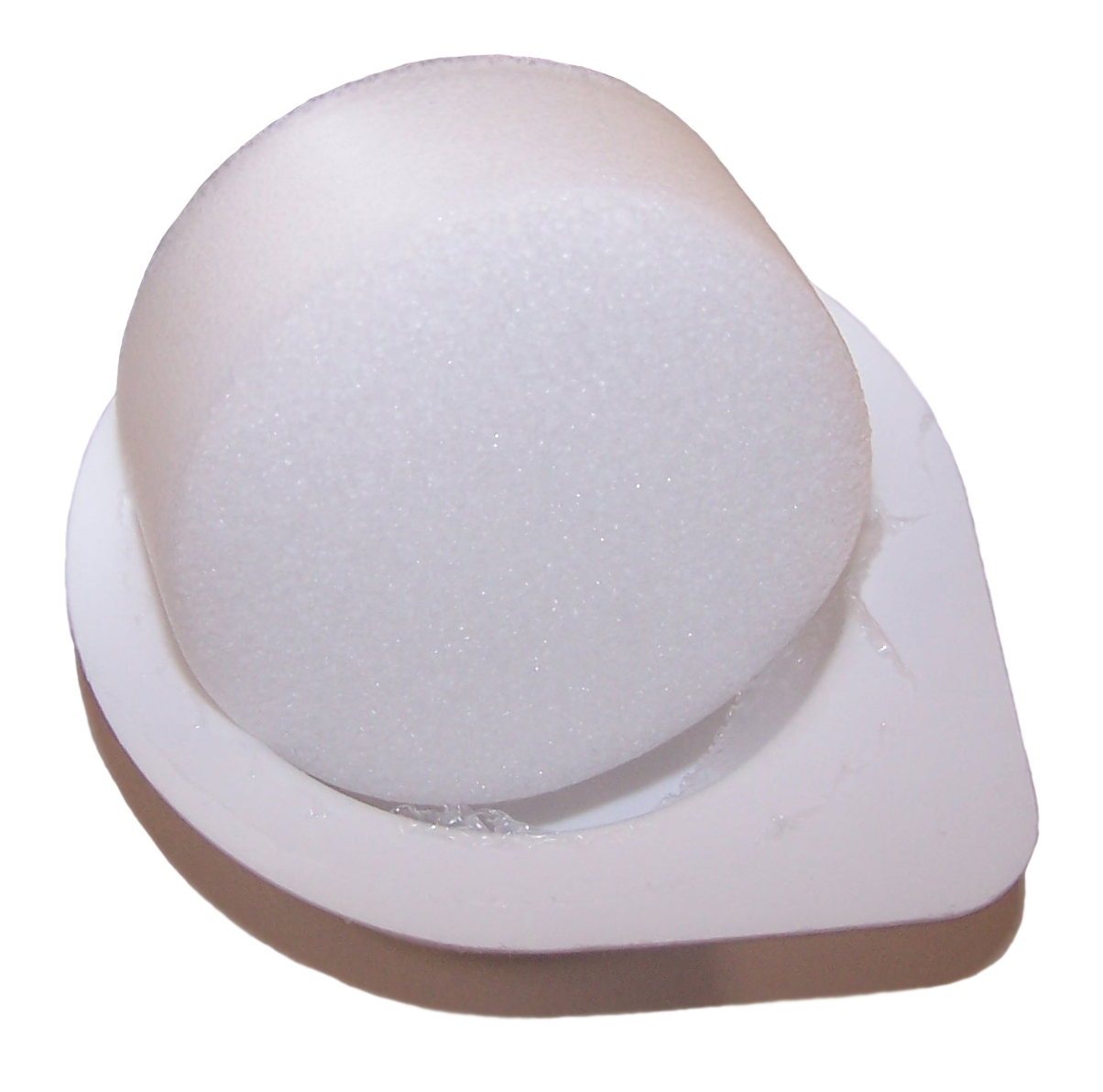
A contraceptive sponge set inside its open package.

=== Intrauterine devices ===
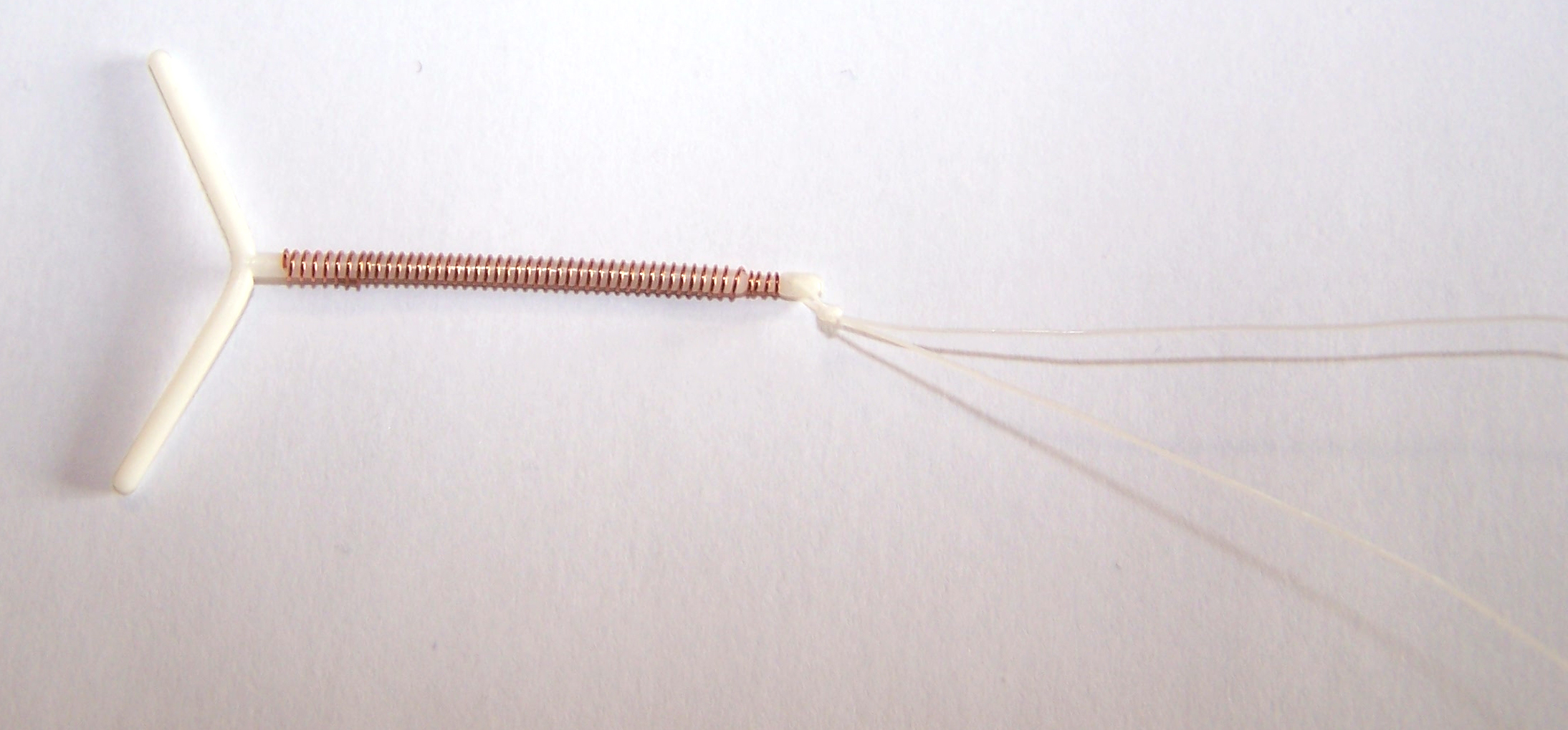
Copper T-shaped IUD with removal strings

The current intrauterine devices (IUD) are small devices, often T-shaped, containing either copper or levonorgestrel, which are inserted into the uterus. They are one form of long-acting reversible contraception which is the most effective type of reversible birth control. Failure rates with the copper IUD is about 0.8% while the levonorgestrel IUD has a failure rates of 0.2% in the first year of use. Among types of birth control, they, along with birth control implants, result in the greatest satisfaction among users. As of 2007, IUDs are the most widely used form of reversible contraception, with more than 180 million users worldwide.

Evidence supports effectiveness and safety in adolescents and those who have and have not previously had children. IUDs do not affect breastfeeding and can be inserted immediately after delivery. They may also be used immediately after an abortion. Once removed, even after long term use, fertility returns to normal immediately.

While copper IUDs may increase menstrual bleeding and result in more painful cramps, hormonal IUDs may reduce menstrual bleeding or stop menstruation altogether. Cramping can be treated with painkillers like non-steroidal anti-inflammatory drugs. Other potential complications include expulsion (2–5%) and rarely perforation of the uterus (less than 0.7%). A previous model of the intrauterine device (the Dalkon shield) was associated with an increased risk of pelvic inflammatory disease; however, the risk is not affected with current models in those without sexually transmitted infections around the time of insertion. IUDs appear to decrease the risk of ovarian cancer.

=== Sterilization ===
Two broad categories exist: surgical and non-surgical.

Surgical sterilization is available in the form vasectomy for men and of tubal ligation for women. Short term complications are twenty times less likely from a vasectomy than a tubal ligation. After a vasectomy, there may be swelling and pain of the scrotum which usually resolves in one or two weeks. Chronic scrotal pain associated with negative impact on quality of life occurs after vasectomy in about 1–2% of men. With tubal ligation, complications occur in 1 to 2 percent of procedures with serious complications usually due to the anesthesia. Tubal ligation decreases the risk of ovarian cancer. Neither method offers protection from sexually transmitted infections. Sometimes, salpingectomy is also used for sterilization in women.

The permanence of this decision may cause regret in some men and women. Of women who have undergone tubal ligation after the age of 30, about 6% regret their decision, as compared with 20–24% of women who received sterilization within one year of delivery and before turning 30, and 6% in nulliparous women sterilized before the age of 30. By contrast, less than 5% of men are likely to regret sterilization. Men who are more likely to regret sterilization are younger, have young or no children, or have an unstable marriage. In a survey of biological parents, 9% stated they would not have had children if they were able to do it over again.

Although sterilization is considered a permanent procedure, it is possible to attempt a tubal reversal to reconnect the fallopian tubes or a vasectomy reversal to reconnect the vasa deferentia. In women, the desire for a reversal is often associated with a change in spouse. Pregnancy success rates after tubal reversal are between 31 and 88 per cent, with complications including an increased risk of ectopic pregnancy. The number of males who request reversal is between 2 and 6 percent. Rates of success in fathering another child after reversal are between 38 and 84 percent; with success being lower the longer the period between the vasectomy and the reversal. Sperm extraction followed by in vitro fertilization may also be an option in men.

=== Behavioral ===
Behavioral methods involve regulating the timing or method of intercourse to prevent the introduction of sperm into the female reproductive tract, either altogether or when an egg may be present. If used perfectly the first-year failure rate may be around 3.4%; however, if used poorly first-year failure rates may approach 85%.

==== Fertility awareness ====
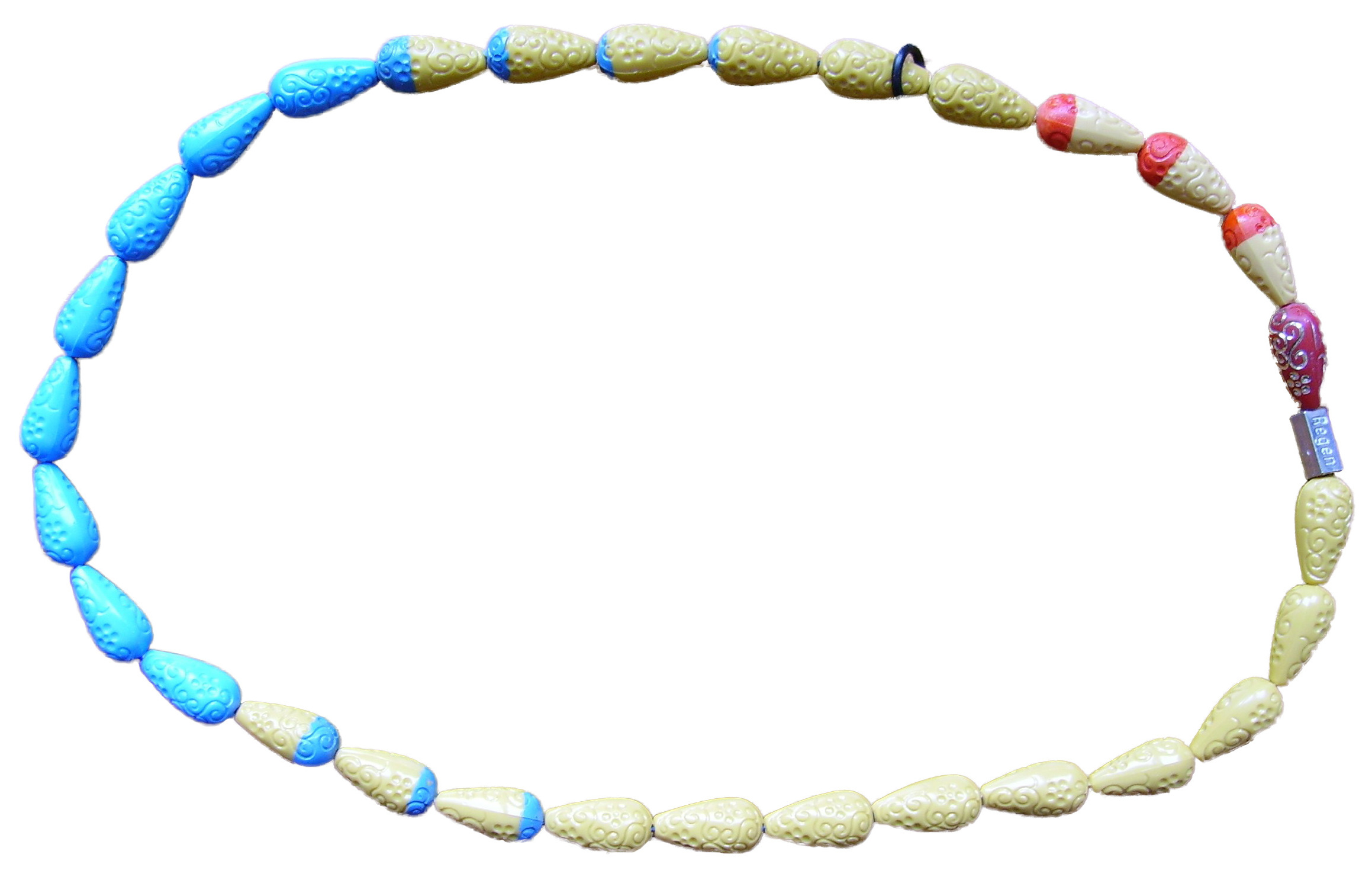
A CycleBeads tool, used for estimating fertility based on days since last menstruation

Fertility awareness methods involve determining the most fertile days of the menstrual cycle and avoiding unprotected intercourse. Techniques for determining fertility include monitoring basal body temperature, cervical secretions, or the day of the cycle. They have typical first-year failure rates of 24%; perfect use first-year failure rates depend on which method is used and range from 0.4% to 5%. The evidence on which these estimates are based, however, is poor as the majority of people in trials stop their use early. Globally, they are used by about 3.6% of couples. If based on basal body temperature and another primary sign, the method is called symptothermal. First-year failure rates of 20% overall and 0.4% for perfect use have been reported in clinical studies of the symptothermal method. Many fertility tracking apps are available, as of 2016, but they are more commonly designed to assist those trying to get pregnant rather than prevent pregnancy.

==== Withdrawal ====
The withdrawal method (also known as coitus interruptus) is the practice of ending intercourse ("pulling out") before ejaculation. The main risk of the withdrawal method is that the man may not manoeuvre correctly or on time. First-year failure rates vary from 4% with perfect usage to 22% with typical usage. It is not considered birth control by some medical professionals.

There is little data regarding the sperm content of pre-ejaculatory fluid. While some tentative research did not find sperm, one trial found sperm present in 10 out of 27 volunteers. The withdrawal method is used as birth control by about 3% of couples.

==== Abstinence ====
Sexual abstinence may be used as a form of birth control, meaning either not engaging in any type of sexual activity, or specifically not engaging in vaginal intercourse, while engaging in other forms of non-vaginal sex. Complete sexual abstinence is 100% effective in preventing pregnancy. However, among those who take a pledge to abstain from premarital sex, as many as 88% who engage in sex, do so prior to marriage. The choice to abstain from sex cannot protect against pregnancy as a result of rape, and public health efforts emphasizing abstinence to reduce unwanted pregnancy may have limited effectiveness, especially in developing countries and among disadvantaged groups.

Deliberate non-penetrative sex without vaginal sex or deliberate oral sex without vaginal sex are also sometimes considered birth control. While this generally avoids pregnancy, pregnancy can still occur with intercrural sex and other forms of penis-near-vagina sex (genital rubbing, and the penis exiting from anal intercourse) where sperm can be deposited near the entrance to the vagina and can travel along the vagina's lubricating fluids.

Abstinence-only sex education does not reduce teenage pregnancy. Teen pregnancy rates and STI rates are generally the same or higher in states where students are given abstinence-only education, as compared with comprehensive sex education. Some authorities recommend that those using abstinence as a primary method have backup methods available (such as condoms or emergency contraceptive pills).

==== Lactation ====
The lactational amenorrhea method involves the use of a woman's natural postpartum infertility which occurs after delivery and may be extended by breastfeeding. For a postpartum woman to be infertile (protected from pregnancy), their periods have usually not yet returned (not menstruating), they are exclusively breastfeeding the infant, and the baby is younger than six months. If breastfeeding is the infant's only source of nutrition and the baby is less than 6 months old, 93–99% of women are estimated to have protection from becoming pregnant in the first six months (0.75–7.5% failure rate). The failure rate increases to 4–7% at one year and 13% at two years. Feeding formula, pumping instead of nursing, the use of a pacifier, and feeding solids all increase the chances of becoming pregnant while breastfeeding. In those who are exclusively breastfeeding, about 10% begin having periods before three months and 20% before six months. In those who are not breastfeeding, fertility may return as early as four weeks after delivery.

=== Emergency ===
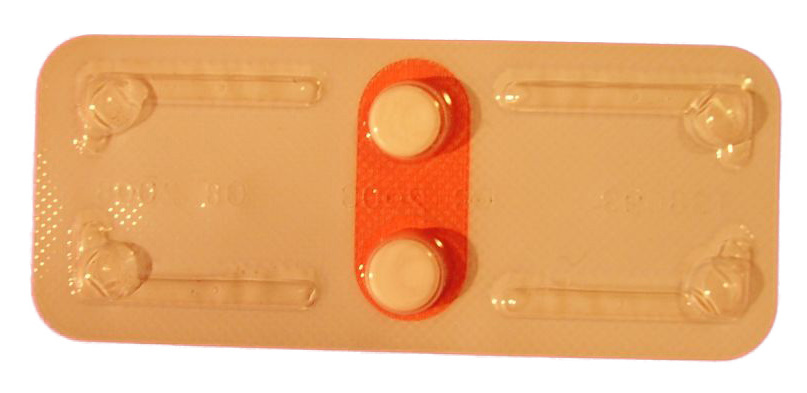
A split dose of two emergency contraceptive pills

Emergency contraceptive methods are medications (sometimes misleadingly referred to as "morning-after pills") or devices used after unprotected sexual intercourse with the hope of preventing pregnancy. Emergency contraceptives are often given to victims of rape. They work primarily by preventing ovulation or fertilisation. They are unlikely to affect implantation, but this has not been completely excluded. Several options exist, including high dose birth control pills, levonorgestrel, mifepristone, ulipristal and IUDs. All methods have minimal side effects. Providing emergency contraceptive pills to women in advance of sexual activity does not affect rates of sexually transmitted infections, condom use, pregnancy rates, or sexual risk-taking behavior. In a UK study, when a three-month "bridge" supply of the progestogen-only pill was provided by a pharmacist along with emergency contraception after sexual activity, this intervention was shown to increase the likelihood that the person would begin to use an effective method of long-term contraception.

Levonorgestrel pills, when used within 3 days, decrease the chance of pregnancy after a single episode of unprotected sex or condom failure by 70% (resulting in a pregnancy rate of 2.2%). Ulipristal, when used within 5 days, decreases the chance of pregnancy by about 85% (pregnancy rate 1.4%) and is more effective than levonorgestrel. Mifepristone is also more effective than levonorgestrel, while copper IUDs are the most effective method. IUDs can be inserted up to five days after intercourse and prevent about 99% of pregnancies after an episode of unprotected sex (pregnancy rate of 0.1 to 0.2%). This makes them the most effective form of emergency contraceptive. In those who are overweight or obese, levonorgestrel is less effective and an IUD or ulipristal is recommended.

=== Dual protection ===
Dual protection is the use of methods that prevent both sexually transmitted infections and pregnancy. This can be with condoms either alone or along with another birth control method or by the avoidance of penetrative sex.

If pregnancy is a high concern, using two methods at the same time is reasonable. For example, two forms of birth control are recommended in those taking the anti-acne drug isotretinoin or anti-epileptic drugs like carbamazepine, due to the high risk of birth defects if taken during pregnancy.

== Effects ==
=== Health ===
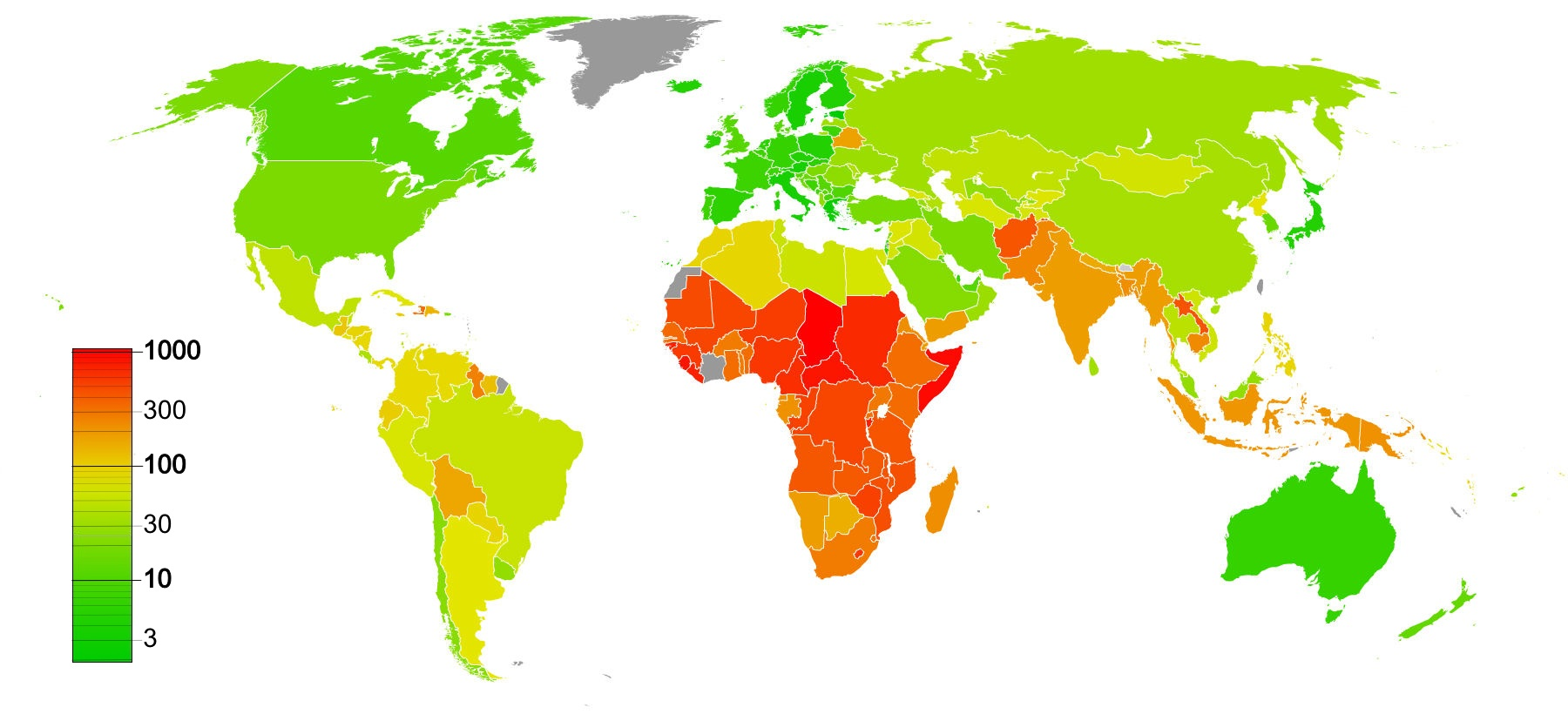
Maternal mortality rate as of 2010.

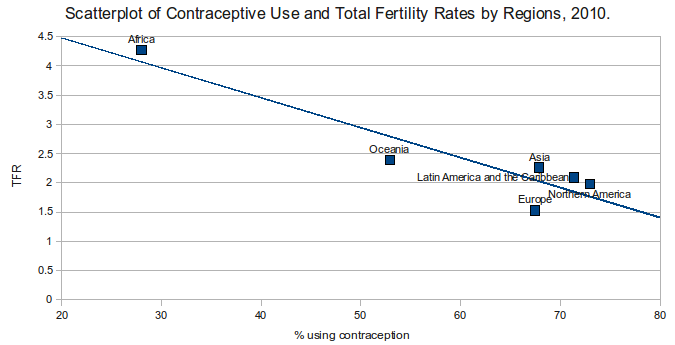
Birth control use and total fertility rate by region.

Contraceptive use in developing countries is estimated to have decreased the number of maternal deaths by 40% (about 270,000 deaths prevented in 2008) and could prevent 70% of deaths if the full demand for birth control were met. These benefits are achieved by reducing the number of unplanned pregnancies that subsequently result in unsafe abortions and by preventing pregnancies in those at high risk.

Birth control also improves child survival in the developing world by lengthening the time between pregnancies. In this population, outcomes are worse when a mother gets pregnant within eighteen months of a previous delivery. Delaying another pregnancy after a miscarriage, however, does not appear to alter risk and women are advised to attempt pregnancy in this situation whenever they are ready.

Teenage pregnancies, especially among younger teens, are at greater risk of adverse outcomes, including early birth, low birth weight, and death of the infant. In 2012, in the United States, 82% of pregnancies in those between the ages of 15 and 19 years old were unplanned. Comprehensive sex education and access to birth control are effective in decreasing pregnancy rates in this age group.

Birth control methods, especially hormonal methods, can also have undesirable side effects. The intensity of side effects can range from minor to debilitating and varies with individual experiences. These most commonly include changes in menstruation regularity and flow, nausea, breast tenderness, headaches, weight gain, and mood changes (specifically an increase in depression and anxiety). Additionally, hormonal contraception can contribute to bone mineral density loss, impaired glucose metabolism, increased risk of venous thromboembolism. Comprehensive sex education and transparent discussion of birth control side effects and contraindications between healthcare provider and patient is imperative.

=== Finances ===
Map of countries by fertility rate (2024)

In the developing world, birth control increases economic growth due to there being fewer dependent children and thus more women participating in or making increased contributions to the workforce – as they are usually the primary caregiver for children. Women's earnings, assets, body mass index, and their children's schooling and body mass index all improve with greater access to birth control. Family planning, via the use of modern birth control, is one of the most cost-effective health interventions. For every dollar spent, the United Nations estimates that two to six dollars are saved. These cost savings are related to preventing unplanned pregnancies and decreasing the spread of sexually transmitted illnesses. While all methods are beneficial financially, the use of copper IUDs resulted in the greatest savings.

The total medical cost for a pregnancy, delivery, and care of a newborn in the United States is on average $21,000 for a vaginal delivery and $31,000 for a caesarean delivery as of 2012. In most other countries, the cost is less than half. For a child born in 2011, an average US family will spend $235,000 over 17 years to raise them.

== Prevalence ==
Share of women whose family planning needs are met Map

Globally, as of 2009, approximately 60% of those who are married and able to have children use birth control. How frequently different methods are used varies widely between countries. The most common method in the developed world is condoms and oral contraceptives, while in Africa it is oral contraceptives and in Latin America and Asia it is sterilization. In the developing world overall, 35% of birth control is via female sterilization, 30% is via IUDs, 12% is via oral contraceptives, 11% is via condoms, and 4% is via male sterilization.

While less used in the developed countries than in the developing world, the number of women using IUDs as of 2007 was more than 180 million. Avoiding sex when fertile is used by about 3.6% of women of childbearing age, with usage as high as 20% in areas of South America. As of 2005, 12% of couples are using a male form of birth control (either condoms or a vasectomy) with higher rates in the developed world. Usage of male forms of birth control has decreased between 1985 and 2009. Contraceptive use among women in Sub-Saharan Africa has risen from about 5% in 1991 to about 30% in 2006.

As of 2012, 57% of women of childbearing age want to avoid pregnancy (867 of 1,520 million). About 222 million women, however, were not able to access birth control, 53 million of whom were in sub-Saharan Africa and 97 million of whom were in Asia. This results in 54 million unplanned pregnancies and nearly 80,000 maternal deaths a year. Part of the reason that many women are without birth control is that many countries limit access due to religious or political reasons, while another contributor is poverty. Due to restrictive abortion laws in Sub-Saharan Africa, many women turn to unlicensed abortion providers for unintended pregnancy, resulting in about 2–4% obtaining unsafe abortions each year.

Contraceptive prevalence any methods of women ages 15 49

Unmet need for contraception share of married women of reproductive age

share of women using modern contraceptive methods

== History ==
=== Early history ===
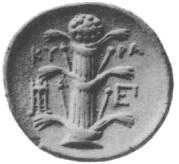
Ancient silver coin from Cyrene depicting a stalk of silphium

The Egyptian Ebers Papyrus from 1550 BC and the Kahun Papyrus from 1850 BC have within them some of the earliest documented descriptions of birth control: the use of honey, acacia leaves and lint to be placed in the vagina to block sperm. Silphium, a species of giant fennel native to north Africa, may have been used as birth control in ancient Greece and the ancient Near East. Due to its desirability, by the first century AD, it had become so rare that it was worth more than its weight in silver and, by late antiquity, it was fully extinct. Most methods of birth control used in antiquity were probably ineffective.

The ancient Greek philosopher Aristotle (c. 384–322 BC) recommended applying cedar oil to the womb before intercourse, a method which was probably only effective on occasion. A Hippocratic text On the Nature of Women recommended that a woman drink a copper salt dissolved in water, which it claimed would prevent pregnancy for a year. This method was not only ineffective but also dangerous, as the later medical writer Soranus of Ephesus (c. 98–138 AD) pointed out. Soranus attempted to list reliable methods of birth control based on rational principles. He rejected the use of superstition and amulets and instead prescribed mechanical methods such as vaginal plugs and pessaries using wool as a base covered in oils or other gummy substances. Many of Soranus's methods were probably also ineffective.

In medieval Europe, any effort to halt pregnancy was deemed immoral by the Catholic Church, although it is believed that women of the time still used some birth control measures, such as coitus interruptus and inserting lily root and rue into the vagina. Women in the Middle Ages were also encouraged to tie weasel testicles around their thighs during sex to prevent pregnancy. The oldest condoms discovered to date were recovered in the ruins of Dudley Castle in England, and are dated back to 1640. They were made of animal gut, and were most likely used to prevent the spread of sexually transmitted infections during the English Civil War. Casanova, living in 18th-century Italy, described the use of a lambskin covering to prevent pregnancy; however, condoms only became widely available in the 20th century.

=== Birth control movement ===
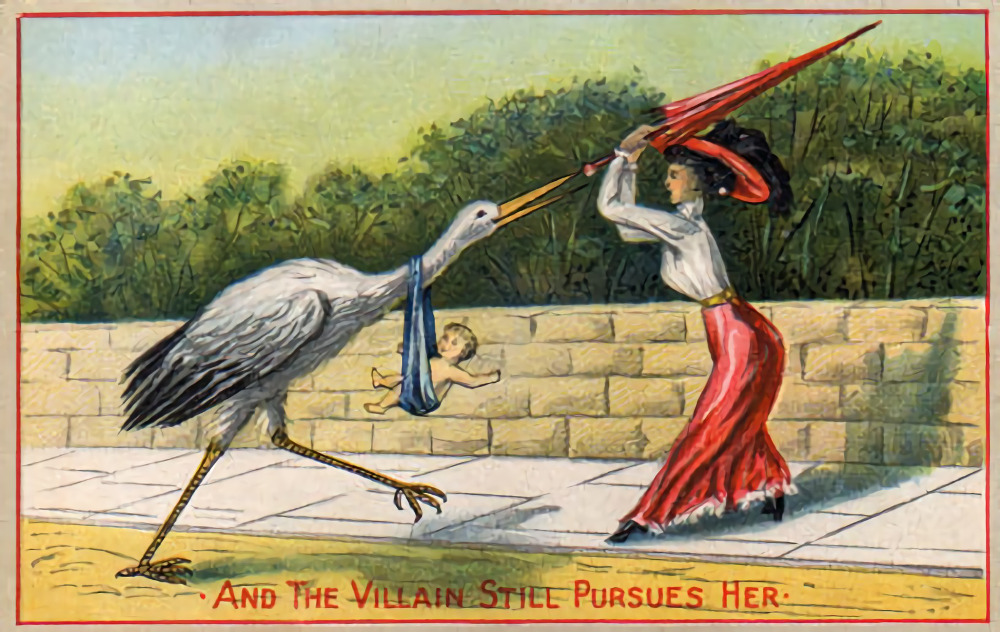
"And the villain still pursues her", a satirical Victorian era postcard

The birth control movement developed during the 19th and early 20th centuries. The Malthusian League, based on the ideas of Thomas Malthus, was established in 1877 in the United Kingdom to educate the public about the importance of family planning and to advocate for getting rid of penalties for promoting birth control. It was founded during the "Knowlton trial" of Annie Besant and Charles Bradlaugh, who were prosecuted for publishing on various methods of birth control.

In the United States, Margaret Sanger and Otto Bobsein popularised the phrase "birth control" in 1914. Sanger primarily advocated for birth control on the idea that it would prevent women from seeking unsafe abortions, but during her lifetime, she began to campaign for it on the grounds that it would reduce mental and physical defects. She was mainly active in the United States but had gained an international reputation by the 1930s. At the time, under the Comstock Law, distribution of birth control information was illegal. She jumped bail in 1914 after her arrest for distributing birth control information and left the United States for the United Kingdom. In the U.K., Sanger, influenced by Havelock Ellis, further developed her arguments for birth control. She believed women needed to enjoy sex without fearing pregnancy. During her time abroad, Sanger also saw a more flexible diaphragm in a Dutch clinic, which she thought was a better form of contraceptive. Once Sanger returned to the United States, she established a short-lived birth-control clinic with the help of her sister, Ethel Bryne, based in the Brownville section of Brooklyn, New York in 1916. It was shut down after eleven days and resulted in her arrest. The publicity surrounding the arrest, trial, and appeal sparked birth control activism across the United States. Besides her sister, Sanger was helped in the movement by her first husband, William Sanger, who distributed copies of "Family Limitation." Sanger's second husband, James Noah H. Slee, would later become involved in the movement, acting as its main funder. Sanger also contributed to the funding of research into hormonal contraceptives in the 1950s. She helped fund research by John Rock and biologist Gregory Pincus that resulted in the first hormonal contraceptive pill, later called Enovid. The first human trials of the pill were done on patients in the Worcester State Psychiatric Hospital, after which clinical testing was done in Puerto Rico before Enovid was approved for use in the U.S.. The people participating in these trials were not fully informed of the medical implications of the pill and often had minimal to no other family planning options. The newly approved birth control method was not made available to the participants after the trials, and contraceptives are still not widely accessible in Puerto Rico.

The increased use of birth control was seen by some as a form of social decay. A decrease of fertility was seen as a negative. Throughout the Progressive Era (1890–1920), there was an increase of voluntary associations aiding the contraceptive movement. These organizations failed to enlist more than 100,000 women because the use of birth control was often compared to eugenics; however, women were seeking a community with like-minded women. The ideology that surrounded birth control started to gain traction during the Progressive Era due to voluntary associations establishing a community. Birth control was unlike the Victorian Era because women wanted to manage their sexuality. The use of birth control was another form of self-interest women clung to. This was seen as women began to gravitate towards strong figures, like the Gibson Girl.

The first permanent birth-control clinic was established in Britain in 1921 by Marie Stopes working with the Malthusian League. The clinic, run by midwives and supported by visiting doctors, offered women's birth-control advice and taught them the use of a cervical cap. Her clinic made contraception acceptable during the 1920s by presenting it in scientific terms. In 1921, Sanger founded the American Birth Control League, which later became the Planned Parenthood Federation of America. In 1924 the Society for the Provision of Birth Control Clinics was founded to campaign for municipal clinics; this led to the opening of a second clinic in Greengate, Salford in 1926. Throughout the 1920s, Stopes and other feminist pioneers, including Dora Russell and Stella Browne, played a major role in breaking down taboos about sex. In April 1930 the Birth Control Conference assembled 700 delegates and was successful in bringing birth control and abortion into the political sphere – three months later, the Ministry of Health, in the United Kingdom, allowed local authorities to give birth-control advice in welfare centres.

The National Birth Control Association was founded in Britain in 1931 and became the Family Planning Association eight years later. The Association amalgamated several British birth control-focused groups into 'a central organisation' for administering and overseeing birth control in Britain. The group incorporated the Birth Control Investigation Committee, a collective of physicians and scientists that was founded to investigate scientific and medical aspects of contraception with 'neutrality and impartiality'. Subsequently, the Association effected a series of 'pure' and 'applied' product and safety standards that manufacturers must meet to ensure their contraceptives could be prescribed as part of the Association's standard two-part-technique combining 'a rubber appliance to protect the mouth of the womb' with a 'chemical preparation capable of destroying... sperm'. Between 1931 and 1959, the Association founded and funded a series of tests to assess chemical efficacy and safety and rubber quality. These tests became the basis for the Association's Approved List of contraceptives, which was launched in 1937, and went on to become an annual publication that the expanding network of FPA clinics relied upon as a means to 'establish facts [about contraceptives] and to publish these facts as a basis on which a sound public and scientific opinion can be built'.

In 1936, the United States Court of Appeals for the Second Circuit ruled in United States v. One Package of Japanese Pessaries that medically prescribing contraception to save a person's life or well-being was not illegal under the Comstock Laws. Following this decision, the American Medical Association Committee on Contraception revoked its 1936 statement condemning birth control. A national survey in 1937 showed 71 percent of the adult population supported the use of contraception. By 1938, 374 birth control clinics were running in the United States despite their advertisement still being illegal. First Lady Eleanor Roosevelt publicly supported birth control and family planning. The restrictions on birth control in the Comstock laws were effectively rendered null and void by Supreme Court decisions Griswold v. Connecticut (1965) and Eisenstadt v. Baird (1972). In 1966, President Lyndon B. Johnson started endorsing public funding for family planning services, and the Federal Government began subsidizing birth control services for low-income families. The Affordable Care Act, passed into law on March 23, 2010, under President Barack Obama, requires all plans in the Health Insurance Marketplace to cover contraceptive methods. These include barrier methods, hormonal methods, implanted devices, emergency contraceptives, and sterilization procedures.

=== Modern methods ===
In 1909, Richard Richter developed the first intrauterine device made from silkworm gut, which was further developed and marketed in Germany by Ernst Gräfenberg in the late 1920s. In 1951, an Austrian-born American chemist, named Carl Djerassi at Syntex in Mexico City made the hormones in progesterone pills using Mexican yams (Dioscorea mexicana). Djerassi had chemically created the pill but was not equipped to distribute it to patients. Meanwhile, Gregory Pincus and John Rock with help from the Planned Parenthood Federation of America developed the first birth control pills in the 1950s, such as mestranol/noretynodrel, which became publicly available in the 1960s through the Food and Drug Administration under the name Enovid. Medical abortion became an alternative to surgical abortion with the availability of prostaglandin analogs in the 1970s and mifepristone in the 1980s.

== Society and culture ==
=== Legal positions ===
Human rights agreements require most governments to provide family planning and contraceptive information and services. These include the requirement to create a national plan for family planning services, remove laws that limit access to family planning, ensure that a wide variety of safe and effective birth control methods are available including emergency contraceptives, make sure there are appropriately trained healthcare providers and facilities at an affordable price, and create a process to review the programs implemented. If governments fail to do the above it may put them in breach of binding international treaty obligations.

In the United States, the 1965 Supreme Court decision Griswold v. Connecticut overturned a state law prohibiting the dissemination of contraception information based on a constitutional right to privacy for marital relationships. In 1972, Eisenstadt v. Baird extended this right to privacy to single people.

In 2010, the United Nations launched the Every Woman Every Child movement to assess the progress toward meeting women's contraceptive needs. The initiative has set a goal of increasing the number of users of modern birth control by 120 million women in the world's 69 poorest countries by 2020. Additionally, they aim to eradicate discrimination against girls and young women who seek contraceptives. The American Congress of Obstetricians and Gynecologists (ACOG) recommended in 2014 that oral birth control pills should be over the counter medications.

Since at least the 1870s, American religious, medical, legislative, and legal commentators have debated contraception laws. Ana Garner and Angela Michel have found that in these discussions men often attach reproductive rights to moral and political matters, as part of an ongoing attempt to regulate human bodies. In press coverage between 1873 and 2013 they found a divide between institutional ideology and real-life experiences of women.

=== Religious views ===
Religions vary widely in their views of the ethics of birth control. The Roman Catholic Church reaffirmed its teachings in 1968 that only natural family planning—methods that involve observing and interpreting signs of fertility to achieve or avoid pregnancy—is permissible. Sociological studies indicate that many self-identified Catholics in developed countries report using birth control methods other than natural family planning. The Greek Orthodox Church admits a possible exception to its traditional teaching forbidding the use of artificial contraception, if used within marriage for certain purposes, including the spacing of births. Among Protestants, there is a wide range of views from supporting none, such as in the Quiverfull movement, to allowing all methods of birth control. Views in Judaism range from the stricter Orthodox sect, which heavily restricts the use of birth control, to the more relaxed Reform sect, which allows most. Hindus may use both natural and modern contraceptives. A common Buddhist view is that preventing conception is acceptable, while intervening after conception has occurred is not. In Islam, contraceptives are allowed if they do not threaten health, although their use is discouraged by some.

=== World Contraception Day ===
September 26 is World Contraception Day, devoted to raising awareness and improving education about sexual and reproductive health, with a vision of a world where every pregnancy is wanted. It is supported by a group of governments and international NGOs, including the Office of Population Affairs, the Asian Pacific Council on Contraception, Centro Latinamericano Salud y Mujer, the European Society of Contraception and Reproductive Health, the German Foundation for World Population, the International Federation of Pediatric and Adolescent Gynecology, International Planned Parenthood Federation, the Marie Stopes International, Population Services International, the Population Council, the United States Agency for International Development (USAID), and Women Deliver.

=== Misconceptions ===
There are a number of common misconceptions regarding sex and pregnancy. Douching after sexual intercourse is not an effective form of birth control. Additionally, it is associated with a number of health problems and thus is not recommended. Women can become pregnant the first time they have sexual intercourse and in any sexual position. It is possible, although not very likely, to become pregnant during menstruation. Contraceptive use, regardless of its duration and type, does not have a negative effect on the ability of women to conceive following termination of use and does not significantly delay fertility. Women who use oral contraceptives for a longer duration may have a slightly lower rate of pregnancy than do women using oral contraceptives for a shorter period of time, possibly due to fertility decreasing with age.

=== Accessibility ===
Access to birth control may be affected by finances and the laws within a region or country. In the United States African American, Hispanic, and young women are disproportionately affected by limited access to birth control, as a result of financial disparity. For example, Hispanic and African American women often lack insurance coverage and are more often poor. New immigrants in the United States are not offered preventive care such as birth control.

In the United Kingdom contraception can be obtained free of charge via contraception clinics, sexual health or GUM (genitourinary medicine) clinics, via some GP surgeries, some young people's services and pharmacies.

In September 2021, France announced that women aged under 25 in France will be offered free contraception from 2022. It was elaborated that they "would not be charged for medical appointments, tests, or other medical procedures related to birth control" and that this would "cover hormonal contraception, biological tests that go with it, the prescription of contraception, and all care related to this contraception".

From August 2022 onwards contraception for women aged between 17 and 25 years will be free in the Republic of Ireland.

==== Public provisioning for contraception ====
In most parts of the world, the political attitude to contraception determines whether and how much state provisioning of contraceptive care occurs. In the United States, for example, the Republican party and the Democratic party have held opposite positions, contributing to continuous policy shifts over the years. In the 2010s, policies, and attitudes to contraceptive care shifted abruptly between Obama's and Trump's administrations. The Trump administration extensively overturned the efforts for contraceptive care, and reduced federal spending, compared to efforts and funding during the Obama administration.

==== Advocacy ====
Free the Pill, a collaboration between Advocates for Youth and Ibis Reproductive Health are working to bring birth control over-the-counter, covered by insurance with no age-restriction throughout the United States.

==== Approval ====
On July 13, 2023, the first US daily oral nonprescription over-the-counter birth control pill was approved for manufacturing by the FDA. The pill, Opill, is expected to be more effective in preventing unintended pregnancies than condoms are. Perrigo, a pharmaceutical company based in Dublin is the manufacturer. Opill became available in 2024.

== Research directions ==
=== Females ===
Improvements in existing birth control methods are needed, as around half of those who get pregnant unintentionally are using birth control at the time. Many alterations of existing contraceptive methods are being studied, including a better female condom, an improved diaphragm, a patch containing only progestin, and a vaginal ring containing long-acting progesterone. This vaginal ring appears to be effective for three or four months and is currently available in some areas of the world. For women who rarely have sex, the taking of the hormonal birth control levonorgestrel around the time of sex looks promising.

A number of methods to perform sterilization via the cervix are being studied. One involves putting quinacrine in the uterus which causes scarring and infertility. While the procedure is inexpensive and does not require surgical skills, there are concerns regarding long-term side effects. Another substance, polidocanol, which functions in the same manner is being looked at. A device called Essure, which expands when placed in the fallopian tubes and blocks them, was approved in the United States in 2002. In 2016, a black boxed warning regarding potentially serious side effects was added, and in 2018, the device was discontinued.

=== Males ===
Despite high levels of interest in male contraception, progress has been stymied by a lack of industry involvement. Most funding for male contraceptive research is derived from government or philanthropic sources.

Several novel contraceptive methods based on hormonal and non-hormonal mechanisms of action are in various stages of research and development, up to and including clinical trials, including gels, pills, injectables, implants, wearables, and oral contraceptives.

Recent avenues of research include proteins and genes required for male fertility. For instance, the serine/threonine-protein kinase 33 (STK33) is a testis-enriched kinase that is indispensable for male fertility in humans and mice. An inhibitor of this kinase, CDD-2807, has recently been identified and induced reversible male infertility without measurable toxicity in mice. Such an inhibitor would be a potent male contraceptive if it passed safety and efficacy tests.

== Animals ==
Neutering or spaying, which involves removing some of the reproductive organs, is often carried out as a method of birth control in household pets. Many animal shelters require these procedures as part of adoption agreements. In large animals the surgery is known as castration.

Birth control is also being considered as an alternative to hunting as a means of controlling overpopulation in wild animals. Contraceptive vaccines have been found to be effective in a number of different animal populations. Kenyan goat herders fix a skirt, called an olor, to male goats to prevent them from impregnating female goats.

== See also ==
- Human population planning – Practice of controlling rate of growth
- Immunocontraception – Using an animal's anti-disease protections against its reproductive system
- Misinformation related to birth control – False or misleading information on birth control
