= Injectable birth control =

Form of hormonal contraception

Injectable birth control is a form of hormonal contraception and may refer to:

- Progestogen-only injectable birth control
- Combined injectable birth control

Estrogen-only injectable birth control, for instance estradiol undecylate, has also been studied, but has not been marketed.
