= Gerard Francis Loft =

Gerard Francis Loft S.M.
- Bishop of Auki
- Church: Catholic Church
- Diocese: Diocese of Auki
- In office: 5 December 1983 – 19 October 2004
- Predecessor: Diocese erected
- Successor: Christopher Cardone

Orders
- Ordination: 20 July 1958
- Consecration: 11 March 1984 by Daniel Stuyvenberg

Personal details
- Born: 6 April 1933 Wellington, Dominion of New Zealand, British Empire
- Died: 4 February 2007 (aged 73)

Gerard Francis Loft (6 April 1933 − 4 February 2007) was a New Zealand Roman Catholic bishop.

Ordained to the priesthood on 20 July 1958, Loft was named bishop of the Roman Catholic Diocese of Auki, Solomon Islands in 1983 and resigned in 2004.
