= List of cathedrals in Solomon Islands =

This is the list of cathedrals in Solomon Islands sorted by denomination.

== Catholic ==
Cathedrals of the Catholic Church in Solomon Islands:

- St. Augustine Cathedral in Auki
- St. Peter's Cathedral in Gizo
- Holy Cross Cathedral in Honiara (consecrated 17 September 1978)

== Anglican ==
Cathedrals of the Anglican Church of Melanesia in Solomon Islands:

- Cathedral Church of St Barnabas in Honiara

== See also ==
- Lists of cathedrals
