= Religion and birth control =

Religious views on birth control

Religious adherents vary widely in their views on birth control (also known as contraception). This can be true even between different branches of one faith. Examples of this include: Judaism, Christianity and Hinduism. Some religious believers find that their own opinions of the use of birth control differ from the beliefs espoused by the leaders of their faith, and many grapple with the ethical dilemma of what is conceived as "correct action" according to their faith, versus personal circumstance, reason, and choice. This article will discuss various views on birth control of the major world religions Christianity, Buddhism, Judaism, Islam, Hinduism, Later-Day Saints, Taoism, Confucianism and Baha'i.

The question of whether contraception is a viable option for participants has a range of different beliefs and arguments, which depend on the religion's views on when life begins, and questions of a God or deity's will for human reproduction. Modern arguments for the woman's health are also considered in many religions as a basis for birth control use.

== Christianity ==
Among Christian denominations today there are a large variety of positions towards contraception that range from the acceptance of birth control to only allowing natural family planning to teaching Quiverfull doctrine, which holds that Christians should have large families. The Catholic Church has historically taught against artificial contraception. The Orthodox Church doesn't permit their use. Contraception was taught against by non-Catholic Christians until 1930 when the Anglican Communion changed its policy. Soon after, according to Flann Campbell, mainline Protestant groups came to accept the use of modern contraceptives as a matter of what they considered Biblically allowable freedom of conscience. Conservative Protestants hold any one of the three aforementioned positions (acceptance of birth control, natural family planning, or Quiverfull) depending on the denomination.

Before the twentieth century, most Christian groups opposed contraception, though their positions have since diversified. The Catholic Church still forbids sex outside marriage and views both abortion and contraception as violating God's authority over life. While some Catholics continue to uphold this ban, many now call for a re-evaluation of birth control. Eastern Orthodoxy generally rejects abortion except to save the mother's life, and some Orthodox clergy accept Catholic views on contraception. Protestant denominations vary widely in their perspectives on birth control.

=== Roman Catholicism ===
The Catholic Church is opposed to artificial contraception but supports the use of natural cycles to regulate births. This belief dates back to the first centuries of Christianity. Artificial contraception is taught to not fulfill the ideal of married love, while methods such as natural family planning (NFP) are in full accordance with Christian doctrine.

Pope Pius XI explicitly condemned birth control in his 1930 encyclical Casti connubii, stating:

No reason, however grave, can make what is intrinsically contrary to nature to be in conformity with nature and morally right. And since the conjugal act by its very nature is destined for the begetting of children, those who in exercising it deliberately frustrate its natural power and purpose are acting against nature, and are doing something that is base and intrinsically immoral".[...] The Catholic Church [...] raises her voice as a sign of her divine mission, and through Our mouth proclaims anew: any use of marriage exercised in such a way that through human effort the act is deprived of its natural power to procreate human life violates the law of God and of nature, and those who commit such an action are stained with the guilt of grave sin.

Pope Paul VI confirmed this teaching in his 1968 encyclical Humanae vitae. The following explains:

Therefore We base Our words on the first principles of a human and Christian doctrine of marriage when We are obliged once more to declare that the direct interruption of the generative process has already begun and, above all, all direct abortion, even for therapeutic reasons, are to by excluded as lawful means of regulating the number of children. Equally to be condemned, as the magisterium of the Church has affirmed on many occasions, is direct sterilization, whether of the man of the woman, whether permanent or temporary. Similarly excluded is any action which either before, at the moment of, or after sexual intercourse, is specifically intended to prevent procreation—whether as an end or as a means.

Several other documents provide more insight into the Church's position on contraception. The commission appointed to study the question in the years leading up to Humanae Vitae issued two unofficial reports, a so-called "majority report" which described reasons the Catholic Church should change its teaching on contraception, signed by 61 of 64 scholars assigned to the pontifical commission, and a "minority report" which reiterated the reasons for upholding the traditional Catholic view on contraception. In 1997, the Vatican released a document entitled "Vademecum for Confessors" (2:4) which states "[t]he Church has always taught the intrinsic evil of contraception." Furthermore, many Church Fathers condemned the use of contraception.

Pope Francis in his apostolic exhortation Amoris laetitia repeats Catholic teaching and gives guidance in its interpretation. "The complexity of the issues that arose revealed the need for continued open discussion of a number of doctrinal, moral, spiritual, and pastoral questions." He also continues with a warning that: "The debates carried on in the media, in certain publications and even among the Church’s ministers, range from an immoderate desire for total change without sufficient reflection or grounding, to an attitude that would solve everything by applying general rules or deriving undue conclusions from particular theological considerations." The Pope finishes this with "Since 'time is greater than space', I would make it clear that not all discussions of doctrinal, moral or pastoral issues need to be settled by interventions of the magisterium. Unity of teaching and practice is certainly necessary for the Church, but this does not preclude various ways of interpreting some aspects of that teaching or drawing certain consequences from it. This will always be the case as the Spirit guides us towards the entire truth."

The 1987 document Donum vitae opposes in-vitro fertilization because it is harmful to embryos and separates procreation from the union of the spouses. Later on, the 2008 instruction Dignitas personae denounces embryonic manipulations and new methods of contraception.

Roderick Hindery reported that several Western Catholics have voiced significant disagreement with the Church's stance on contraception. Among them, dissident theologian Charles Curran criticized the stance of Humanae vitae on artificial birth control. In 1968, the Canadian Conference of Catholic Bishops issued what many interpreted as a dissenting document, the Winnipeg Statement, in which the bishops recognized that a number of Canadian Catholics found it "either extremely difficult or even impossible to make their own all elements of this doctrine" (that of Humanae vitae). Additionally, in 1969, they reasserted the Catholic principle of primacy of conscience, a principle that they said should be properly interpreted. They insisted that "a Catholic Christian is not free to form his conscience without consideration of the teaching of the Magisterium, in the particular instance exercised by the Holy Father (i.e., Pope) in an encyclical letter". According to the American Enterprise Institute, 78% of American Catholics say they believe the Church should allow Catholics to use birth control, though other polls reflect different numbers.

In December 2018, in a responsum (a reply by a Curial department that is intended to settle a question or dispute, but that is not a papal document), the Congregation for the Doctrine of the Faith (CDF), under its Prefect, Cardinal Luis Ladaria Ferrer SJ, stated that if the uterus can be found, with moral certainty, to not be able to ever carry a fertilized ovum to the point of viability, that a hysterectomy could be performed because under that very narrow circumstance, it is considered the removal of a failed organ and not per se sterilization since viability is not possible. If a hysterectomy is only done under this circumstance, it does not represent a shift in church teaching.

In July 2023, Pope Francis sent a message to a Natural Family Planning conference in which he upheld the central teachings of Humanae Vitae, warning Catholics that the widespread use of contraception had impoverished many societies and that some countries were now in danger of demographic collapse.

Despite the Church's teaching on contraception, spacing out births by natural means is a behavior that remains in full communion with the Church. Many married couples employ natural family planning (NFP) Studies show a correlation between the practice of NFP and healthy spousal relationships in married couples who utilize this practice. Regardless of the Church's ideas about contraception, 99% of Catholics have used some type of contraception. About one quarter of Catholics use sterilization, 25% use hormonal birth control methods such as birth control pills and 15% have used a long-acting reversible form of birth control such as the IUD.

=== Mainline Protestantism ===
Author and FamilyLife Today radio host Dennis Rainey suggests four categories as useful in understanding current Protestant attitudes concerning birth control. These are the "children in abundance" group, such as Quiverfull adherents who view all birth control and natural family planning as wrong; the "children in managed abundance" group, which accepts only natural family planning; the "children in moderation" group which accepts prudent use of a wide range of contraceptives; and, the "no children" group which sees itself as within their Biblical rights to define their lives around non-natal concerns.

Meanwhile, some Protestant movements, such as Focus on the Family, view contraception used outside of marriage as an encouragement to promiscuity. The Waldensian Evangelical Church believes birth control is acceptable.

Sex is a powerful drive, and for most of human history, it was firmly linked to marriage and childbearing. Only relatively recently has the act of sex commonly been divorced from marriage and procreation. Some religious groups express concern that access to contraception may encourage sexual activity outside marriage.

==== Anglican and Episcopalian Views ====
The Anglican Church in 1930 at the Lambeth conference came to agree upon the use of birth control within certain circumstances. This includes being decided on Christian Principles, and in situations where it is a moral obligation to do so. The Anglican Church refutes the use of any contraception for the motives of "selfishness, luxary, or mere convenience."

=== Eastern Orthodoxy and Oriental Orthodoxy ===
The Greek Orthodox Archdiocese of America "permits the use of certain contraceptive practices within marriage to space children, enhance the expression of marital love and protect health."

The Russian Orthodox Church allows for the use of birth control as long as it does not fall under the class of abortifacients.

=== Church of Jesus Christ of Latter-day Saints ===
In the largest denomination of Mormonism the Church of Jesus Christ of Latter-day Saints (LDS Church), teachings on birth control have changed throughout of its history going from condemning it as sinful to allowing it. The current church stance as of 2023 is that "decisions about birth control and the consequences of those decisions rest solely with each married couple" and that they should consider "the physical and mental health of the mother and father and their capacity to provide the basic necessities of life for their children" when planning a family. Furthermore, the LDS Church acknowledges sex is a way to express marital love and believes any family that is able bodied should follow Gods first commandment given to Adam and Eve "be fruitful, and multiply, and replenish the earth." The LDS Church encourages couples to pray and consult the church but most importantly for the couple to consult between themselves and the Lord on what is best for them.

== Hinduism ==
In Hinduism, decisions about contraception are generally seen as personal choices for women rather than matters dictated by religious rules. This may relate to traditional ideas of purity and pollution, where reproductive processes like menstruation and childbirth are considered temporarily impure. Some Hindu texts offer guidelines in situations involving multiple partners and make indirect references to birth control through norms about abstinence. Vyasa, for example, advises avoiding intercourse in certain circumstances, such as when a wife is too young, ill, or has many children. Overall, interpretations of birth control within Hindu teachings vary.

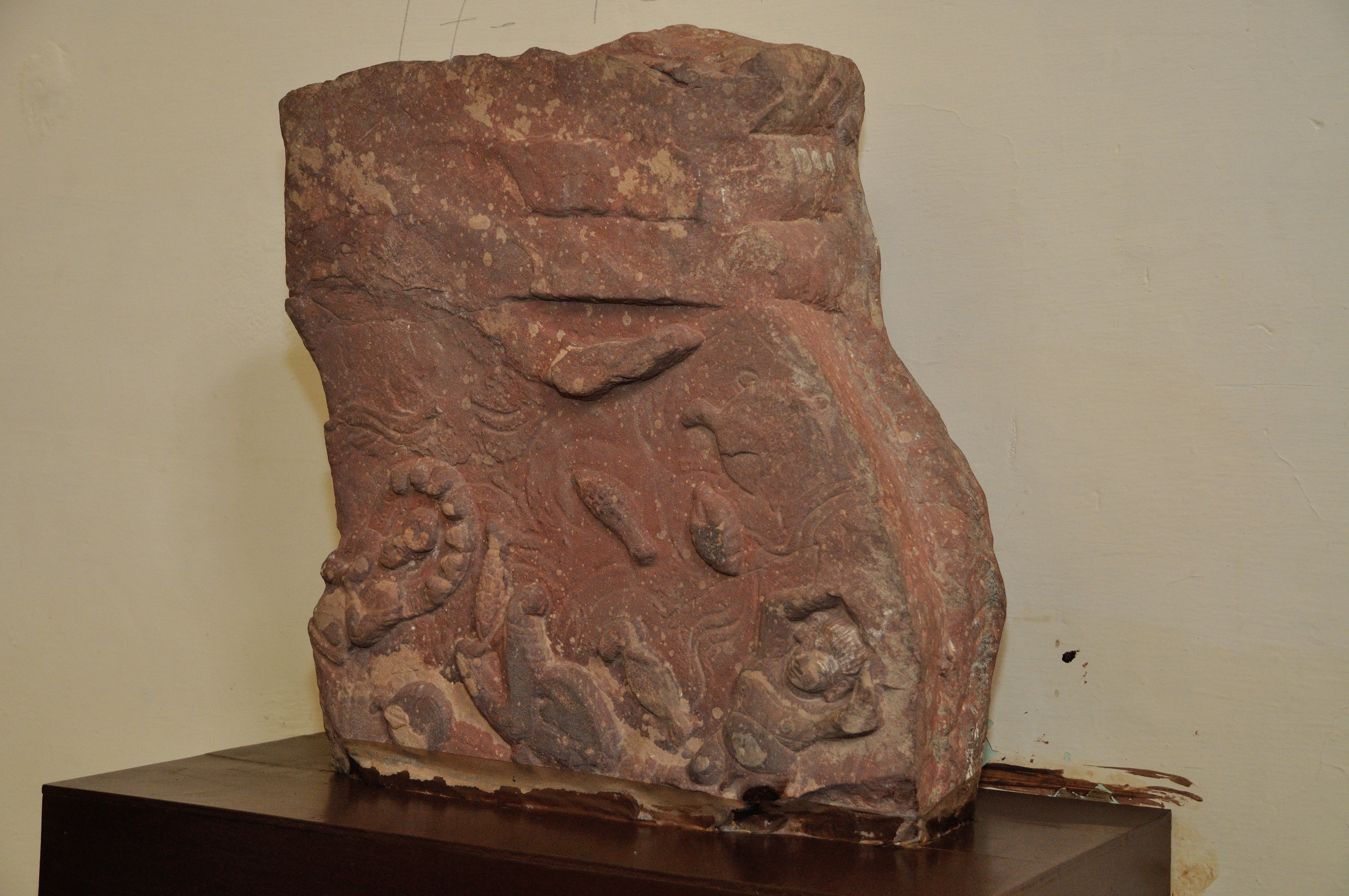
Vasudeva Carrying Baby Krishna

Some Hindu scriptures include advice on what a couple should do to promote conception—thus providing contraceptive advice to those who want it. Rishi Charaka, the father of Ayurveda, has advised various methods of contraceptives based on the physiology of reproduction. Methods like Safe Period, Anti-implantation agents, Inhibition of Ovulation or Spermatogenesis, Intrauterine contraceptive device, Antizygotic drugs, etc. are hinted at in the scripture. The Mahabharata mentions that killing an embryo is a sin. From this one could infer that though contraceptives are advised abortion is considered as a primal sin. Most Hindus accept that there is a duty to have a family during the householder stage of life, as debt to family lineage called Pitra Rin (Father's Debt) and so are unlikely to avoid having children altogether. The Dharma (doctrine of the religious and moral codes of Hindus) emphasizes the need to act for the sake of the good of the world. Some Hindus, therefore, believe that producing more children than the environment can support goes against this Hindu code. Although fertility is important, conceiving more children than can be supported is treated as violating the Ahimsa (nonviolent rule of conduct).

Because India has such a large and dense population of Hindus, the Dharma still echoes with the ongoing discussion of birth control. This discussion has focused on the environmental issue of overpopulation rather than more personal/religious ethics, and birth control is not a major ethical issue, in modern India.

== Islam ==
The Qur'an does not make any explicit statements about the morality of contraception, but contains statements encouraging procreation. The Islamic prophet Muhammad also is reported to have said "Marry and procreate". In many Muslim-majority countries, birth control (and family planning in general) is readily accessible. Since early Islamic history, Muslim scholars approved of the use of birth control if the two spouses both agreed to it.

Coitus interruptus, a primitive form of birth control, was a known practice at the time of Muhammad, and his companions engaged in it. Muhammad knew about this but never advised or preached against it.

Muslim scholars have extended the example of coitus interruptus, by analogy, to declaring permissible other forms of contraception, subject to three conditions.

1. As offspring are the right of both the husband and the wife, the birth control method should be used with both parties consent.
2. The method should not cause permanent sterility.
3. The method should not otherwise harm the body.

Ahmadiyya Muslims believe birth control is prohibited if resorted to for fear of financial strain.

== Judaism ==
The Jewish view on birth control currently varies between the Orthodox, Conservative, and Reform branches of Judaism. Among Orthodox Judaism, the use of birth control has been considered only acceptable for use in certain circumstances, for example, when the couple already has two children or if they are both in school. However, it is more complex than that. The biblical law of being "fruitful" and "multiplying" is viewed as one that applies only to men, and women have no commandment to have children. This is the reason why women are the ones to choose a form of contraception that they wish to use (i.e. spermicide, oral contraception, intrauterine device, etc.), while males don't. Generally speaking, when Orthodox Jewish couples contemplate the use of contraceptives, they generally consult a rabbi who evaluates the need for the intervention and which method is preferable from a halachic point of view. Including the previously mentioned reasons (already having children, student status, etc.) there are many other reasons for a rabbi to grant a couple permission to use contraception. In many modern Orthodox communities, it is recommended for young newlywed couples to wait a year before having a child so as to strengthen their marital foundation and their relationship before bringing children into the home. This is because children generally require a strong parental unit, and bring challenges and difficult decisions which can be a heavier burden on the marriage itself if the parents are not functioning together well. Since marriage is a sacred relationship of the highest importance in Judaism, couples are always counseled to behave and live in a manner that constantly works to uphold a happy and loving home; this may include planning to slightly delay having children when the couple has had a speedy dating and marriage timeline (as is common in Orthodoxy when many couples abstain from premarital sex).

Conservative Judaism, while generally encouraging its members to follow the traditional Jewish views on birth control has been more willing to allow greater exceptions regarding its use to fit better within modern society. Reform Judaism has generally been the most liberal with regard to birth control allowing individual followers to use their own judgment in what if any, birth control methods they might wish to employ. Jews who follow halakha based on the Talmudic tradition of law will not have sex during the 11–14 days after a woman begins menstruating. This precludes them from utilizing some forms of "natural birth control" such as the "Calendar-based contraceptive methods" which are relatively unobjectionable to other religious groups.

The introduction of oral contraception, or "the pill," in the 1960s and the intrauterine device did not cause a big uprising in the Jewish community as it did in other religious communities due to the understanding of their great benefit and no strict association with their availability and greater promiscuity, as has been the fear in other religions.

== Buddhism ==
Buddhist attitudes to contraception are based on the idea that it is wrong to kill for any reason. The most common Buddhist view on birth control is that contraception is acceptable if it prevents conception, but that contraceptives that work by stopping the development of a fertilized egg are wrong and should not be used. This is due to the belief that consciousness is imbued at conception.

Langenberg proposes a different perspective on the portrayal of female impurity in Buddhist texts. Rather than attributing it to cultural biases or the ascetic agenda of male monastics, she suggests that while women were theoretically seen as equally capable of achieving Buddhist goals, they were still distinguished from men due to broader social, moral, and institutional factors. She navigates a nuanced position, showing that women could be ordained yet were still depicted as inferior. This duality reflects the complexity of both texts and the cultures that produce them. Throughout the Journal, Langenberg continues to explore these layered representations using diverse analytical approaches.

== Baháʼí Faith ==
The Baháʼí Faith does not "condemn the practice of birth control or...confirm it," although Baháʼís see procreation as an essential part of marriage and oppose contraception which violates the spirit of that provision.

== Taoism & Confucianism ==
Taoists and Confucians do not have a direct prohibitation on birth control as contraceptives have been used throughout China since the pre-Qin period (2100-211BCE). Typically the use of natural contraceptives are encouraged due to traditional chinese medical beliefs, however the use of rythmn and withdrawal techniques which balance yin and yang have garnered trust by practitioners. Confucians emphasize the importance of descendants and consider it a great fault in life to not behind any, they also believe the quality of those descendants matter so careful planning is needed. Taoists think of sexual acts as related to health, pleasure, and reproduction; the use of contraceptives is accepted by Taoists as long as it is within harmony of yourself and does not lean into exess. These two beliefs overall come to a similar position as Taoist and Confucian cultural resources allocate people the tools to support and accept family planning in the modern era.

== See also ==
- Muslim population growth
- Religion and abortion
- Abstinence-only sex education
- Catholic teachings on sexual morality
- Catholic theology of the body
- Conscientious objection to abortion
