= Holy Cross Cathedral, Honiara =

Holy Cross Cathedral
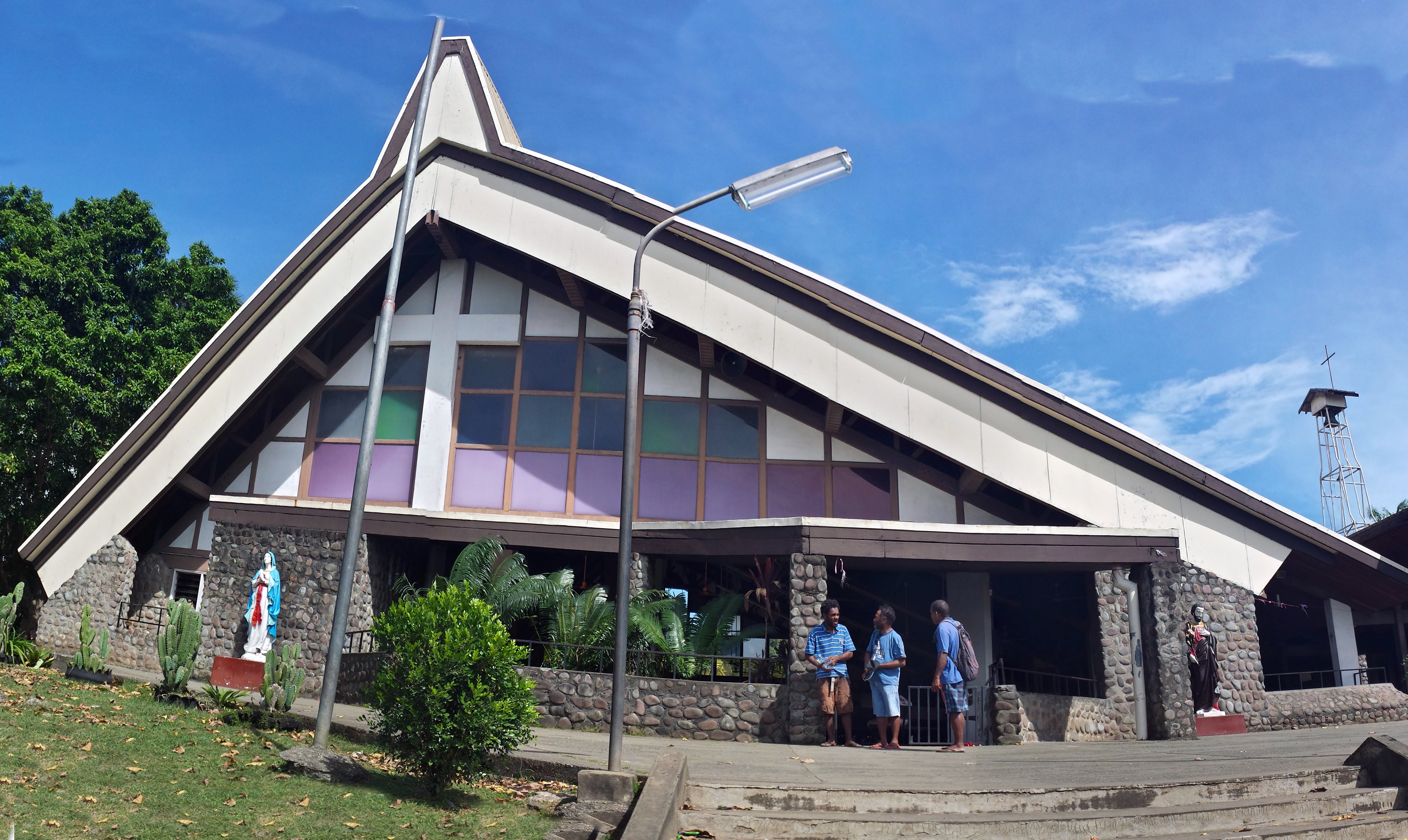
- Holy Cross Cathedral
- 9.436252°S 159.963472°E
- Location: Honiara
- Country: Solomon Islands
- Denomination: Catholic Church
- Tradition: Roman Rite

History
- Dedication: Holy Cross
- Consecrated: 17 September 1978

Architecture
- Groundbreaking: 1976
- Completed: 1979

Administration
- Archdiocese: Honiara

Clergy
- Archbishop: Christopher Cardone, OP

The Holy Cross Cathedral, also referred to as the Catholic Cathedral of Honiara, is the cathedral church and seat of the Metropolitan Archdiocese of Honiara (Latin: Archidioecesis Honiaranus). It is located in the city of Honiara, which is on Guadalcanal Island and is the capital of the Solomon Islands, a country in the southwest Pacific Ocean.

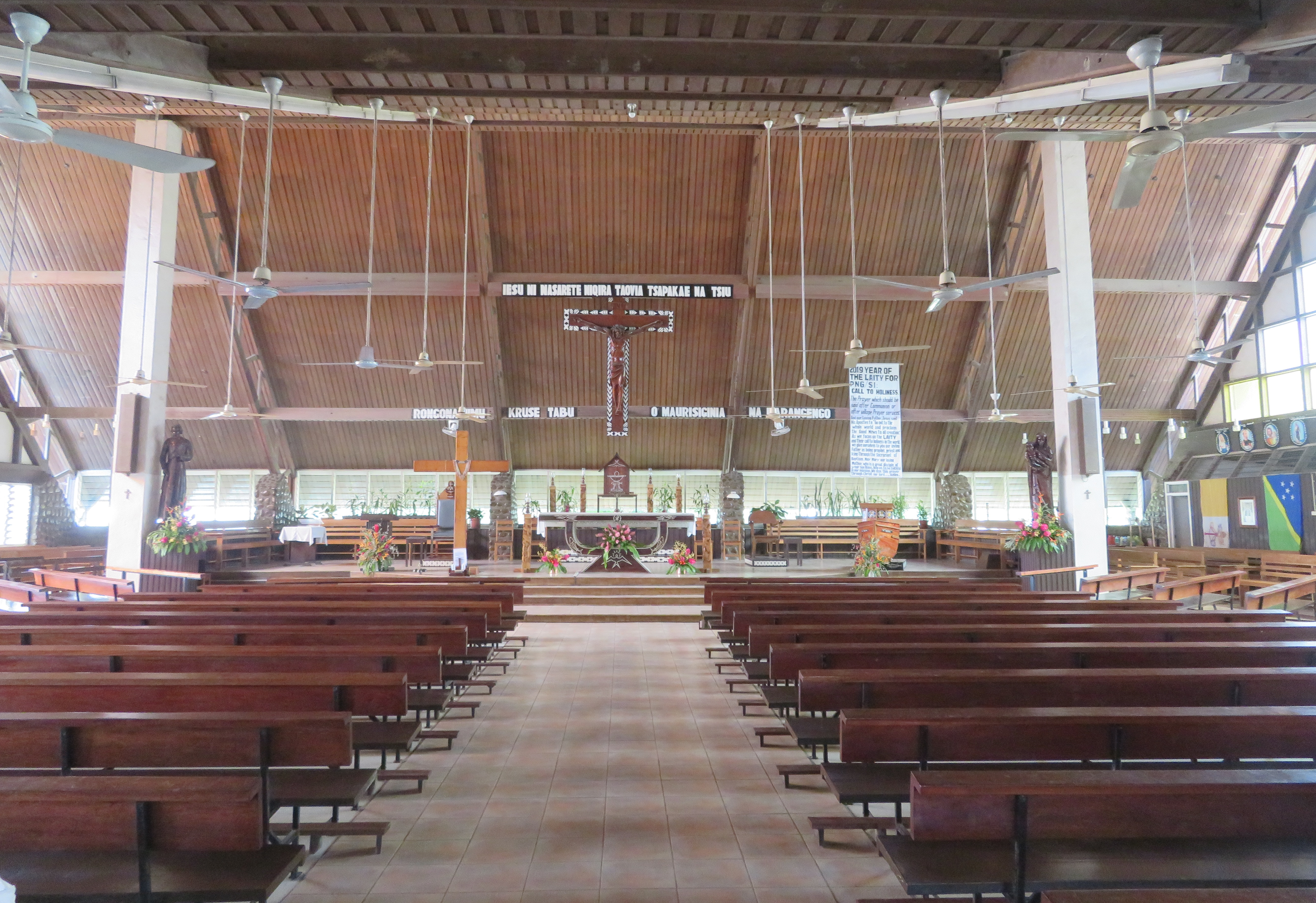
Interior

Pope John Paul II elevated Honiara to its status of Metropolitan Archdiocese by papal bull, "Laetentur insulae multae", in 1978. (Note: The title of the papal bull is from Psalm 97:1.) Archbishop Christopher Cardone assumed the pastoral responsibility for the archdiocese in 2016. The church follows the tradition of the Roman or Latin rite.

== Background and history ==
Honiara's first Catholic cathedral was erected at the foot of the town's Vavaya Ridge (or Vatuliva Hill; now commonly, Cathedral Hill), pending construction of the permanent cathedral. This Holy Cross pro-cathedral was adapted from a large Quonset hut; it was blessed and opened to the public in 1957. A brick of the first Catholic mission in the Solomon Islands, built in 1845, was incorporated into its façade. The site chosen for the cathedral was believed to be that of the first Christian cross erected in the Solomons, planted by the expedition of Alvaro de Mendaña in 1568. On the same spot, the first Mass in the Solomons was celebrated by a friar from among Mendaña's crew. This expedition of the Spanish Empire was Europeans' first encounter with the Solomon Islands. (Note: The Spanish expedition left for home after some six months of unsuccessful effort at colonisation; they encountered food shortages, ill health, internal conflict, and deteriorating relations with the local people. Apart from the unrecorded lives of several islanders abducted and taken to Peru by Mendaña, no further contact between Solomon Islanders and Europeans occurred until 1767, some two hundred years later. The Catholic Church, other than a short-lived attempt in the mid-1840s, did not return again until 1898, this time with a more long-lasting presence.)

Its foundation stone laid in 1976, the permanent Holy Cross Cathedral, built on the same hill where the pro-cathedral stood, was consecrated and opened in 1978. Its style has been described as "Pacific architecture". There are several carved elements such as those seen on the altar and the lectern where it is possible to see the influence of local culture in the church.

== See also ==
- Catholicism in the Solomon Islands
- Religion in the Solomon Islands
