= Thuburnica (see) =

Thuburnica is a former Roman city and bishopric, presently a Catholic titular see.

== History ==
The Ancient city of Thuburnica (which some hold to be identical with neighboring Bulla Regia, which is another titular see), in the Roman province of Africa Proconsularis, was important enough to become a bishopric, suffragan of the Metropolitan Archbishop of Carthage.

== Ancient Bishopric ==
Very little is known of the ancient Bishopric. Only one Bishop is known, Aeneaus a catholic Bishop at the Council of Carthage 411.

=== Titular see ===
In 1933, the Ancient diocese was nominally restored as a Latin Catholic titular see.

It has had the following incumbents, of the lowest (episcopal) rank, with a single archiepiscopal exception :

- Attilio Beltramino, Consolata Missionaries (I.M.C.) (1948.01.08 – 1953.03.25)
- Cyprien-Louis-Pierre-Clément Tourel (1955.02.04 – 1958.02.24)
- Heinrich Tenhumberg (1958.05.28 – 1969.07.07)
- Barthélémy Malunga (1969.07.24 – 1971.03.11)
- Matthias N’Gartéri Mayadi (1985.10.28 – 1987.03.07) (later Archbishop)
- Titular Archbishop José Saraiva Martins, Claretians (C.M.F.) (1988.05.26 – 2001.02.21) as Secretary of the Roman Congregation for Catholic Education (for Seminaries and Educational Institutions) (1988.05.26 – 1998.05.30) and as Prefect of the Roman Congregation for the Causes of Saints (1998.05.30 – 2008.07.09), created Cardinal-Deacon of Nostra Signora del Sacro Cuore (2001.02.21 [2001.04.22] – 2009.02.24); later promoted Cardinal-Bishop of Palestrina (2009.02.24 – ...)
- Christopher Cardone, Dominicans (O.P.) (2001.03.27 – 2004.10.19)
- José Leopoldo González González (2005.11.15 – 2015.03.19)
- Rolf Steinhäuser, auxiliary bishop of Cologne (2015.12.11 - ...)
