= St. Peter's Cathedral, Gizo =

Coordinates: 8°06′20″S 156°50′20″E

St. Peter's Cathedral
- St. Peter's Cathedral
- Location: Gizo
- Country: Solomon Islands
- Denomination: Roman Catholic Church

Administration
- Diocese: Roman Catholic Diocese of Gizo

The St. Peter's Cathedral also called Gizo Cathedral is the cathedral affiliated to the Catholic Church that is located in the city of Gizo, the second largest locality in the Solomon Islands a country of Oceania.

The cathedral on Gizo Island and the Western Province was inaugurated and blessed by Bishop EJ Crawford on June 18, 1964, follow the Roman or Latin rite and is one of the 3 Catholic cathedrals in that nation and is the mother church of the Diocese of Gizo (Dioecesis Ghizotana) Suffragan from the Archdiocese of Honiara and began as an apostolic vicariate in 1959, being elevated to its present status in 1966 through the bull "Laeta increa" of Pope Paul VI.

The cathedral building suffered damage in the earthquake and tsunami of April 2007, was later remodeled and extended on the occasion of the 50th anniversary of the founding of the cathedral.

It is under the pastoral responsibility of Bishop Luciano Capelli.

== See also ==
- List of cathedrals in Solomon Islands
- Roman Catholicism in the Solomon Islands
- St. Peter's Basilica
