= José Saraiva Martins =

Portuguese Catholic cardinal (born 1932)

His Eminence José Saraiva Martins GCC
- Prefect Emeritus of the Congregation for the Causes of Saints
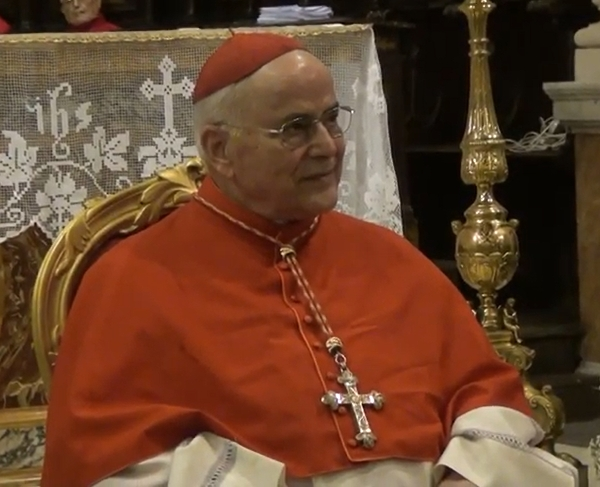
- Cardinal Saraiva Martins in January 2016
- Church: Latin Church
- Appointed: 30 May 1998
- Term ended: 9 July 2008
- Predecessor: Alberto Bovone
- Successor: Angelo Amato
- Other post: Cardinal-Bishop of Palestrina
- Previous posts: Titular Archbishop of Thuburnica (1988–2001); Secretary of the Congregation for Catholic Education (1988–1998); Cardinal-Deacon of Nostra Signora del Sacro Cuore (2001–2009)

Orders
- Ordination: 16 March 1957 by Ettore Cunial
- Consecration: 2 July 1988 by Agostino Casaroli
- Created cardinal: 21 February 2001 by Pope John Paul II
- Rank: Cardinal-Bishop

Personal details
- Born: 6 January 1932 (age 94) Gagos de Jarmelo, Guarda, Portugal
- Denomination: Catholic Church
- Motto: Veritas in charitate (Truth in charity)
- Coat of arms

Styles of José Saraiva Martins
- Reference style: His Eminence
- Spoken style: Your Eminence
- Informal style: Cardinal
- See: Palestrina (titular see)

José Saraiva Martins, C.M.F. GCC (born 6 January 1932) is a Portuguese cardinal of the Catholic Church. He was prefect of the Congregation for the Causes of Saints from 1998 to 2008.

== Biography ==
Saraiva Martins was born on 6 January 1932 in Gagos de Jarmelo in Guarda, Portugal, to Antonio and Maria (née da Natividade Martins) Saraiva. He joined the Congregation of the Missionary Sons of the Immaculate Heart of Mary, commonly known as the Claretians, and professed his vows on 22 August 1950. Saraiva Martins was ordained as a priest by Archbishop Ettore Cunial on 16 March 1957. He studied at the Pontifical Gregorian University and the Pontifical University of St. Thomas Aquinas (Angelicum) in Rome, where he earned a licentiate and a doctorate (respectively) in theology.

Saraiva Martins taught metaphysics for a year in Marino, Italy, then in 1959 came to the Roman Claretianum, where he taught fundamental and sacramental theology for a decade. He became rector of the Pontifical Urbaniana University for three terms (1977–1980, 1980–1983, 1986–1988).

On 26 May 1988, Saraiva Martins was appointed Secretary of the Congregation for Catholic Education and titular archbishop of Thuburnica. He received his episcopal consecration from Cardinal Agostino Casaroli, with Archbishops Jan Pieter Schotte and Giovanni Battista Re serving as co-consecrators, on the following 2 July in the Basilica of Ss. XII Apostoli. On 30 May 1998, he was named Prefect of the Congregation for the Causes of Saints.

Pope John Paul made him Cardinal Deacon of Nostra Signora del Sacro Cuore in the consistory of 21 February 2001. Like all major Vatican officials he lost his position on 2 April 2005 on the death of the pope. He was one of the cardinal electors who participated in the 2005 papal conclave that elected Pope Benedict XVI, who later confirmed him as prefect on 21 April 2005.

On 9 July 2008, Pope Benedict XVI accepted his resignation as prefect to be succeeded by Angelo Amato. On 24 February 2009, he was promoted to the order of cardinal bishops, with title of the suburbicarian see of Palestrina. Pope Benedict XVI allowed Martins to remain as Roman Postulator for the Cause for José Sánchez del Río, a 14-year-old Mexican youth and Cristeros who died a martyr. Martins had conducted the beatification ceremony in Mexico City for the young boy as a stand-in for Pope Benedict XVI. Sanchez del Rio was finally canonized on 16 October 2016 in Rome by Pope Francis.

== Sources ==
Catholic Church titles
Preceded by Antonio María Javierre Ortas	Secretary of the Congregation for Catholic Education; 26 May 1988 – 30 May 1998	Succeeded by Giuseppe Pittau
Preceded by Matthias N’Gartéri Mayadi	— TITULAR — Titular Archbishop of Thuburnica; 26 May 1988 – 21 February 2001	Succeeded by Christopher Michael Cardone
Preceded by Alberto Bovone	Prefect of the Congregation for the Causes of Saints; 30 May 1998 – 9 July 2008	Succeeded by Angelo Amato
Preceded by Mario Luigi Ciappi	Cardinal Deacon of Nostra Signora del Sacro Cuore; 21 February 2001 – 24 February 2009	Succeeded by Kurt Koch
Preceded by Bernardin Gantin	Cardinal Bishop of Palestrina; 24 February 2009 –	Incumbent
