= Bernard Cyril O'Grady =

Australian Roman Catholic bishop (born 1931)

His Excellency, The Most Reverend Bernard Cyril O'Grady O.P.
- Bishop Emeritus of Gizo
- Church: Roman Catholic Church
- Archdiocese: Honiara
- Diocese: Roman Catholic Diocese of Gizo
- Appointed: 3 February 1995
- Term ended: 5 June 2007
- Predecessor: Eusebius John Crawford
- Successor: Luciano Capelli

Orders
- Ordination: 1 December 1956
- Consecration: 19 May 1995 by Eusebius John Crawford

Personal details
- Born: 24 August 1931 (age 95) Adelaide, South Australia, Australia
- Denomination: Roman Catholic

Bernard Cyril O'Grady, O.P. (born 24 August 1931) is an Australian-born Roman Catholic prelate, who served as bishop of the Roman Catholic Diocese of Gizo in the Solomon Islands from 1995 until his retirement in 2007. He is a member of the Dominican Order.

== Early life and priesthood ==
O'Grady was born on 24 August 1931 in Adelaide, South Australia, Australia. He entered the Dominican Order in 1950 and studied for the priesthood in Australia before being ordained a priest on 1 December 1956.

In 1958 he was sent as a missionary to the Solomon Islands, where he served in pastoral ministry and became involved in the development of Catholic education in the region. He later served as director of Catholic education in the Diocese of Gizo and contributed to the establishment and development of several Catholic schools.

O'Grady subsequently returned to Australia, where he served as prior of the Dominican novitiate and retreat house at Blackfriars in Canberra and later worked in priestly formation at the Holy Spirit Seminary in Papua New Guinea.

== Episcopal ministry ==
On 3 February 1995 Pope John Paul II appointed O'Grady as bishop of the Roman Catholic Diocese of Gizo. He received episcopal consecration on 19 May 1995 from Bishop Eusebius John Crawford, with Archbishop Adrian Thomas Smith and Archbishop Ramiro Moliner Inglés serving as co-consecrators.

During his episcopacy he promoted pastoral renewal within the diocese, including the program We Are Church, and supported educational and pastoral initiatives across the Western Solomon Islands.

He also served as director of Caritas in the Solomon Islands and coordinated humanitarian assistance after a major earthquake and tsunami that affected parts of the Diocese of Gizo.

Pope Benedict XVI accepted his resignation as bishop of Gizo on 5 June 2007 upon reaching the canonical retirement age.

After his retirement he returned to Australia and has continued to participate in ecclesiastical events and anniversaries related to his ministry.
