= Thuburnica =

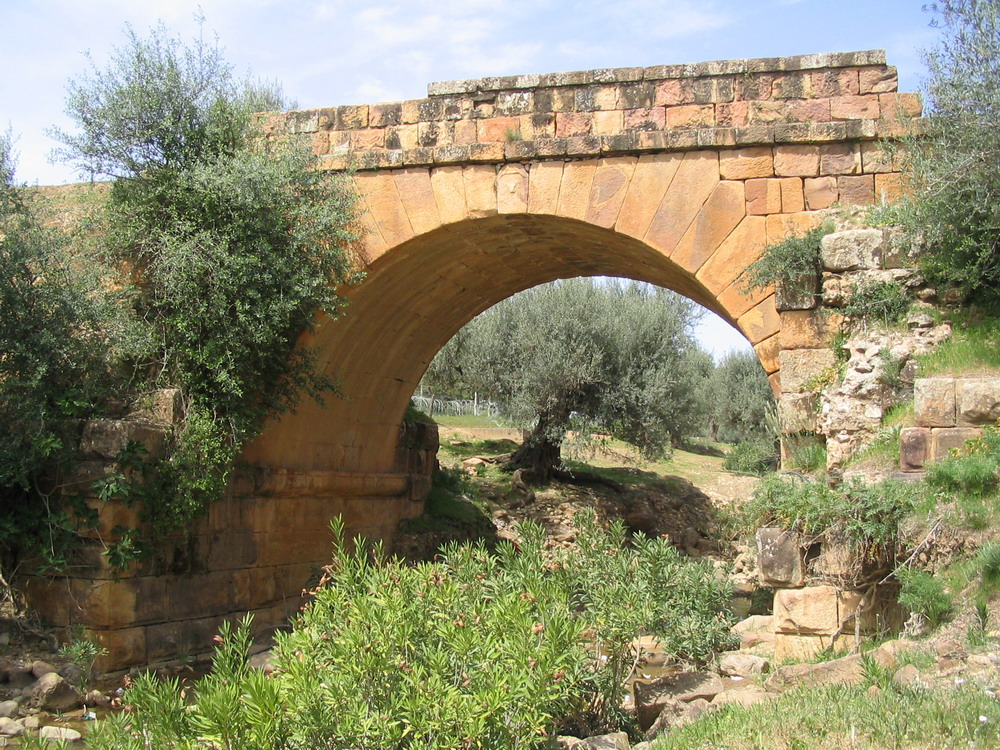
- Roman bridge of Thuburnica

- Location within Tunisia
- 36.527°N 8.470°E
- Location: Tunisia
- Region: Jendouba Governorate

Thuburnica was an ancient Roman-Berber city in the Maghreb. It was located in the present-day El Kalâa, near Chemtou in western Tunisia. It may have been the ancient town of Bulla Regia.

== History ==
The Late Roman Republican general Caius Marius started the Roman presence in Thuburnica, allowing some of his veterans (the "Conditores coloniae" or 'founders of the colonia') to settle in a small ancient Berber village just south of Tabarka, near the border between present Tunisia and Algeria.

A few decades later, the first Roman emperor Augustus settled there some of his veterans creating officially a Roman colonia, governed by duumvir' (a pair of collegial, elected municipal magistrates). Thuburnica was one ten colonies founded by emperor Augustus on or near the coast of the Roman province of Mauretania for the retirement of the veterans of his legions, the others being: Rusucurru, Tubusuctu, Igilgili, Saldae, Rusazu, Rusguniae, Aquae Calidae, Zuccabar, Gunugu and Cartenna.

Since Emperor Diocletianus's provincial reshuffle, Thuburnica was on the border between Mauretania Sitifensis and Africa Proconsularis (roughly modern Tunisia).

The people of Thuburnica were members of the tribal "Arnense" group. Most of the population of Thuburnica in the third century were descendants of the Roman legionaries and this fact made the city one of the most romanised in ancient Mauretania. The Christian religion became the most important only in the fourth century: paganism was still practiced prominently in Emperor Hadrian's time in a local temple dedicated to Ba'al Hammon, later destroyed and finally converted to church.

Thuburnica was conquered by the Vandals and reconquered a century later by Byzantine emperor Justinianus, who built a fortification.

After the Arab invasion in the second half of the seventh century, the city was destroyed and disappeared.

=== Archeological remains ===
There are today few standing edifices dating to Roman Thuburnica. However, a local Roman bridge is still working in perfect conditions.

The ruins include: a mausoleum, two arches, a temple, four cisterns, thermae (public baths), an aqueduct and a small Byzantine fortification.

== See also ==
- Thuburnica (see).
- Cirta
- Cuicul
- Hippo Regius
- Thagaste
