= Alberto Bovone =

Italian Roman Catholic Cardinal (1922–1998)

His Eminence Alberto Bovone
- Prefect of the Congregation for the Causes of Saints
- Church: Roman Catholic Church
- Appointed: 13 June 1995
- Term ended: 17 April 1998
- Predecessor: Angelo Felici
- Successor: José Saraiva Martins
- Other post: Cardinal-Deacon of Ognissanti in Via Appia Nuova (1998)
- Previous posts: Undersecretary of the Congregation for the Doctrine of the Faith (1973-1984); Titular Archbishop of Cesarea in Numidia (1984-1998); Secretary of the Congregation for the Doctrine of the Faith (1984-1995)

Orders
- Ordination: 26 May 1945 by Giuseppe Angrisani
- Consecration: 12 May 1984 by Joseph Alois Ratzinger
- Created cardinal: 21 February 1998 by Pope John Paul II
- Rank: Cardinal-Deacon

Personal details
- Born: Alberto Bovone; 11 June 1922 Frugarolo, Kingdom of Italy
- Died: 17 April 1998 (aged 75) Agostino Gemelli University Polyclinic, Rome, Italy
- Education: Pontifical University of Saint Thomas Aquinas
- Motto: Fidelis et prudens ("Faithful and prudent")
- Coat of arms

Styles of Alberto Bovone
- Reference style: His Eminence
- Spoken style: Your Eminence
- Informal style: Cardinal
- See: none

Alberto Bovone (11 June 1922 – 17 April 1998) was an Italian Cardinal of the Catholic Church. He served as Prefect of the Congregation for the Causes of Saints from 1995 until his death. Pope John Paul II elevated Bovone to the cardinalate in 1998, shortly before his death in the same year.

Alberto Bovone was born in Frugarolo, and attended the seminary in Alessandria. Ordained to the priesthood on 26 May 1945, he then did pastoral work for a year before continuing his studies from 1946 until 1951 at the University of Turin and the Pontifical University of St. Thomas Aquinas (Angelicum) in Rome (where he obtained his doctorate in canon law). Bovone entered the Roman Curia as an official of the Congregation for the Council in October 1951, and was later made Undersecretary of the Congregation for the Doctrine of the Faith on 21 May 1973.

Pope John Paul II named him Titular Archbishop of Caesarea in Numidia on 5 April 1984 and Secretary of the Congregation for the Doctrine of the Faith three days later, on 8 April. Bovone received his episcopal consecration on the following 12 May from Cardinal Joseph Ratzinger, with Bishop Ferdinando Maggioni and Archbishop Luigi Dadaglio serving as co-consecrators. Bovone was the first person ordained as a Bishop by Ratzinger, who would later become Pope Benedict XVI.

As Secretary of the Congregation for the Doctrine of the Faith, he was the second-highest official of that dicastery, under Ratzinger. In 1987, he helped write the instruction Donum vitae on the respect for human life. In 1986 he issued, with Ratzinger, a letter to all bishops "on the pastoral care of homosexual persons" that was hostile to gay "inclinations" (which it said were a "strong tendency ordered toward an intrinsic moral evil") and relationships, calling them "fundamentally disordered" as they were "unable to transmit life"; this stridently recalcitrant position was (albeit much later, in 2021) moderated somewhat by further guidance from the same congregation during the papacy of Pope Francis.

Bovone was later appointed to head the Congregation for the Causes of the Saints on 13 June 1995. As he had yet to be raised to the College of Cardinals, he only held the title of Pro-Prefect of the congregation, until John Paul II created him Cardinal-Deacon of Ognissanti in Via Appia Nuova in the consistory of 21 February 1998, and Bovone became full Prefect of the Causes of the Saints two days later, on 23 February.

The Cardinal died in Rome two months later, at the age of 75. He is buried in his family's plot in Frugarolo.

Catholic Church titles
Preceded by Jean Jérôme Hamer	Secretary of the Congregation for the Doctrine of the Faith; 5 April 1984 – 13 June 1995	Succeeded by Tarcisio Bertone
Preceded by Angelo Felici	Prefect of the Congregation for the Causes of Saints; 13 June 1995 – 17 April 1998	Succeeded by José Saraiva Martins
