= Savina Nongebatu =

Solomon Islands disability rights advocate

- Born: 1969; Gizo, Western Province, British Solomon Islands
- Occupation: Disability rights advocate
- Years active: 2004-present

Savina Nongebatu (born 1969) is a Solomon Islands disability rights advocate who led People with Disabilities Solomon Islands between 2004 and 2011, and served as the deputy CEO of the Pacific Disability Forum between 2018 and 2019.

== Personal life ==
Nongebatu was born in Gizo in Western Province in 1969 and was raised initially by her grandmother, before moving to be with her parents in the capital, Honiara, at the age of 6.

In 2000, following spinal surgery, Nongebatu lost the use of her legs and required a wheelchair in order to be mobile. As a result, she was made redundant from her job as a civil servant in the Ministry of Agriculture.

As of 2018, Nongebatu lives in Suva, Fiji.

== Advocacy ==
Nongebatu has advocated for greater education among Pacific communities, both in the Solomon Islands and beyond, to overcome cultural barriers facing disabled people, including them being seen as 'cursed', and being left behind by their families due to the costs of maintaining their care, or being seen as not worthy of education. She has also called for the adoption of specific vocabulary referring to disabled people within Pacific languages, noting that many lack terms to adequately communicate what disabilities are, causing further barriers and discrimination. Nongebatu has also highlighted how the intersectionality of disability and gender can cause further difficulties, particularly for disabled women. Nongebatu has criticised the Solomon Islands government for inaction with regards to offering practical support to initiatives aimed at overcoming these barriers, in addition to ignorance around the impact of government policy on disabled citizens.

Between 2004 and 2018, Nongebatu worked for People with Disabilities Solomon Islands, the country's only non-governmental disability organisation of which she was a founding member. Between 2004 and 2011 she served as its president, before working as its Office Manager until 2018.

Internationally, as of 2021 Nongebatu is serving on the Australian Government's Pacific Women Shaping Pacific Development Advisory Board. Prior to this, she served as the female co-chair for the Pacific Disability Forum from 2009 until 2011. In 2018, she relocated to Suva to serve as the organisation's deputy CEO.

== Recognition ==
In 2012, Nongebatu received the United States Secretary of State's International Women of Courage Award in recognition of her championing the cause of people with disabilities in the Solomon Islands and the wider Pacific region.
