= Roman Catholic Diocese of Gizo =

Roman Catholic diocese in the Solomon Islands

Coordinates: 8.1046°S 156.8440°E

Diocese of Gizo Dioecesis Ghizotana

Location
- Country: Solomon Islands
- Territory: Western, Choiseul and Isabel provinces
- Ecclesiastical province: Honiara
- Metropolitan: Archdiocese of Honiara

Statistics
- Population: Total; Catholics: 133,374; 16,459 (12.3%)
- Parishes: 8

Information
- Denomination: Catholic Church
- Sui iuris church: Latin Church
- Rite: Roman Rite
- Established: 11 June 1959 (as Apostolic Vicariate of the Western Solomon Islands); 15 November 1966 (as Diocese of Gizo)
- Cathedral: St. Peter's Cathedral

Current leadership
- Bishop: Peter Houhou
- Bishops emeritus: Luciano Capelli, S.D.B.

Website
- catholicgizo.org

The Roman Catholic Diocese of Gizo (Latin: Dioecesis Ghizotana) is a Latin Church ecclesiastical jurisdiction or diocese of the Catholic Church in the Solomon Islands. It is a suffragan diocese of the Archdiocese of Honiara. The diocese covers parts of the western Solomon Islands, including Western Province, Choiseul Province and Isabel Province.

The episcopal seat is in Gizo, where St. Peter's Cathedral serves as the cathedral and mother church of the diocese. The current bishop is Peter Houhou, who was appointed to Gizo in 2023.

== History ==
Catholic missionary activity in the western Solomon Islands preceded the creation of a separate ecclesiastical jurisdiction. Dominican missionaries became particularly important in the development of the Catholic Church in the region during the mid-20th century.

On 11 June 1959, Pope John XXIII established the Apostolic Vicariate of the Western Solomon Islands. Its territory was taken from the apostolic vicariates of the Northern Solomon Islands and Southern Solomon Islands. Eusebius John Crawford, O.P., was appointed the first vicar apostolic in 1960.

On 15 November 1966, Pope Paul VI elevated the apostolic vicariate to the Diocese of Gizo as part of a wider reorganization of the Catholic hierarchy in Papua New Guinea and the Solomon Islands. Crawford became the first diocesan bishop.

The Diocese of Gizo was initially a suffragan see of the Archdiocese of Rabaul. Following the establishment of Honiara as a metropolitan archdiocese in 1978, Gizo became part of the ecclesiastical province of Honiara.

Crawford governed the jurisdiction until his retirement in 1995. He was succeeded by Bernard Cyril O'Grady, O.P., who served until 2007. Luciano Capelli, S.D.B., was appointed bishop in 2007 and remained in office until 2023.

On 16 June 2023, Pope Francis accepted Capelli's resignation and appointed Peter Houhou, then bishop of the Diocese of Auki, as Bishop of Gizo.

== Territory and pastoral activity ==
The diocese serves Catholic communities spread across numerous islands in the western and northwestern Solomon Islands. Its geographical setting makes maritime travel an important part of diocesan administration and pastoral work.

The diocese includes parishes and mission communities across Western, Choiseul and Isabel provinces. Priests, religious communities and lay catechists provide pastoral care in settlements that are often separated by considerable distances.

Dominican missionaries played a major role in the historical development of the diocese, particularly in parish ministry, education and missionary work. Religious sisters and lay workers have also contributed to Catholic schools, health services and community programs.

== St. Peter's Cathedral ==
St. Peter's Cathedral is the principal church of the diocese and the seat of the Bishop of Gizo. The cathedral was opened and blessed by Bishop Eusebius John Crawford on 18 June 1964, when Gizo was still an apostolic vicariate.

When the apostolic vicariate was elevated to diocesan status in 1966, the church of St. Peter was designated as the cathedral of the new diocese.

The cathedral and other church properties in the region were damaged during the 2007 Solomon Islands earthquake. The earthquake and subsequent tsunami caused extensive destruction in Gizo and elsewhere in the western Solomon Islands.

== Bishops ==
=== Ordinaries ===
- Eusebius John Crawford, O.P. (1960–1995)
- Bernard Cyril O'Grady, O.P. (1995–2007)
- Luciano Capelli, S.D.B. (2007–2023)
- Peter Houhou (2023–present)

=== Auxiliary bishop ===
- Christopher Michael Cardone, O.P. (2001–2004), appointed Bishop of Auki

== See also ==
- Catholic Church in the Solomon Islands
- Roman Catholic Archdiocese of Honiara
- Roman Catholic Diocese of Auki
- St. Peter's Cathedral, Gizo
