= Donum vitae =

1987 Roman Catholic document on biomedical issues

Donum Vitae is the "Instruction on Respect for Human Life in Its Origin and on the Dignity of Procreation" which was issued on February 22, 1987, by the Congregation for the Doctrine of the Faith. It addresses biomedical issues from the Roman Catholic Church's perspective. The document was signed by Joseph Ratzinger and Alberto Bovone.

The doctrinal material is not only addressed to all married couples, especially Roman Catholics, but also to pharmacists, doctors, ethicists, theologians, politicians and industrialists, so that they may try to tackle these issues together. Other related documents, such as Humanae Vitae, were also written for a wide variety of individuals and specialists on the matter.

The document specifically indicated that the Church was opposed to in vitro fertilization (IVF). Given that IVF was relatively new at the time, this position provoked lively debate when it was first announced.

In 2008, the instruction Dignitas Personae was released as a supplement to address newer bioethical issues and technologies.
