= Daniel Stuyvenberg =

Daniel Stuyvenberg SM
- Archbishop of Honiara
- Church: Catholic Church
- Archdiocese: Archdiocese of Honiara
- In office: 27 November 1958 – 3 December 1984
- Predecessor: Jean-Marie Aubin
- Successor: Adrian Thomas Smith
- Previous post: Titular Bishop of Dionysias (1958-1966)

Orders
- Ordination: 23 February 1936
- Consecration: 24 February 1959 by Romolo Carboni

Personal details
- Born: Daniel Willem Stuyvenberg; 14 April 1909 Utrecht, Province of Utrecht, Netherlands
- Died: 17 October 1989 (aged 80)

Daniel Willem Stuyvenberg (Utrecht, Netherlands, 14 April 1909 - 17 October 1989) was Archbishop of Honiara, Solomon Islands.

Stuyvenberg was ordained a priest of the Society of Mary by Archbishop Romolo Carboni on 23 February 1936.

On 27 November 1958, aged 49, he was appointed as Vicar Apostolic of Southern Solomon Islands and as the Titular Bishop of Dionysias. Three months later he was ordained as the Titular Bishop of Dionysias.

On 15 November 1966, aged 57, he was appointed Bishop of Honiara, Solomon Islands. On 15 November 1978, aged 69, he was appointed Archbishop of Honiara. He retired on 3 December 1984.

He died on 17 October 1989, aged 80, as the Archbishop Emeritus of Honiara. He had been a priest for 53 years and a bishop for 30 years.
