= Catholic Church in Solomon Islands =

The Catholic Church in Solomon Islands is part of the worldwide Catholic Church, under the spiritual leadership of the Pope in Rome.

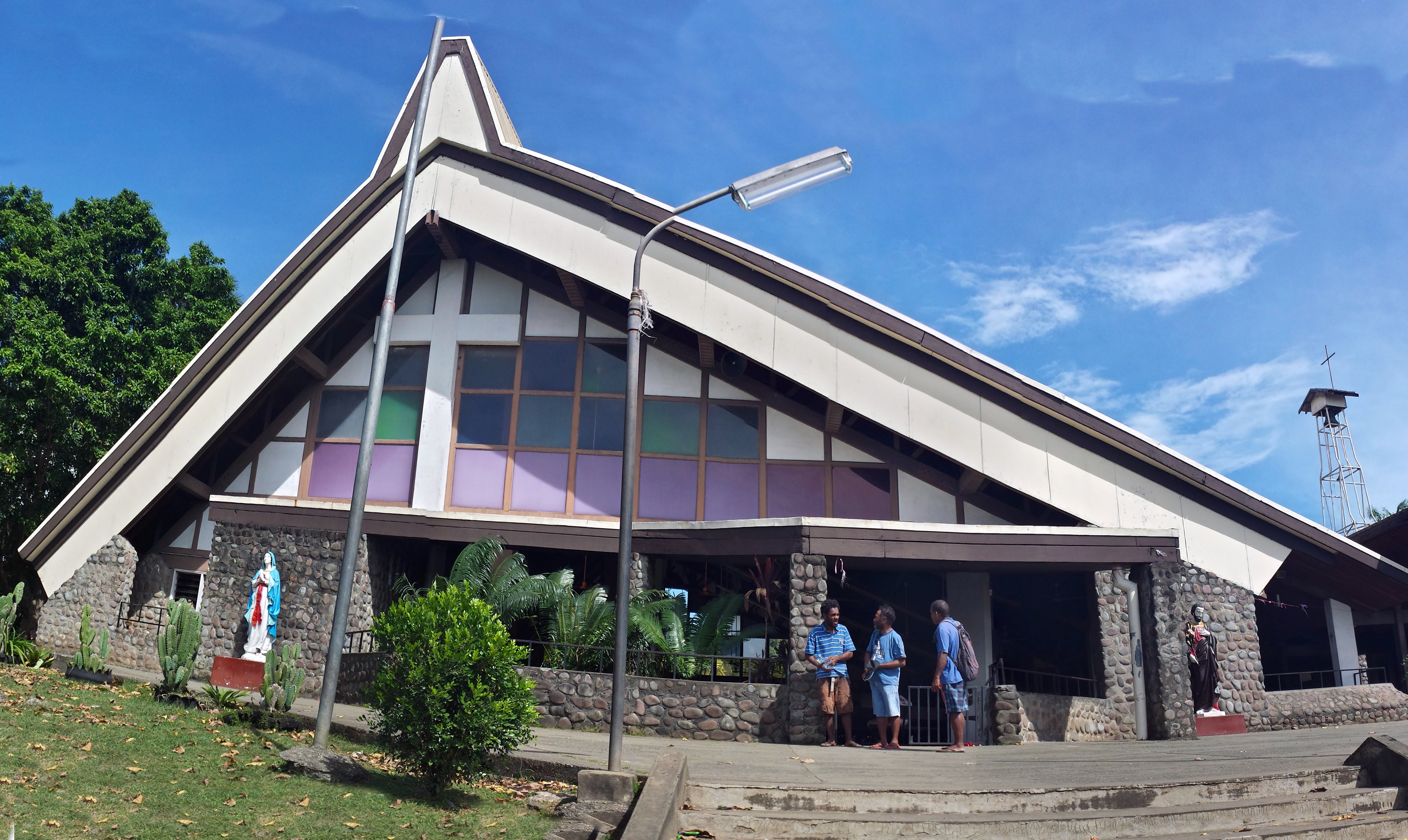
Holy Cross Cathedral in Honiara

Catholic evangelisation of the Solomon Islands archipelago in the nineteenth century was mostly in the hands of the Marist Fathers.

There are over 140,000 Catholics in Solomon Islands in 2022 (one-fifth of the total population). In 2020 there were 89 priests and 120 nuns serving across 34 parishes.

The country is divided into three dioceses: the Archdiocese of Honiara, the Diocese of Gizo and the Diocese of Auki.

In 1957 the current cathedral, Holy Cross Cathedral in Honiara, was blessed and opened to the public. Solomon Islands sent a delegation of young people for the first time to World Youth Day 2008 when it was held in Sydney, Australia. Peter Houhou became the first locally-born bishop when he was consecrated as Bishop of Auki in 2018. He served for 5 years and in mid-2023, the bishopric was vacant.

Holy Name of Mary Seminary at Tenaru in Guadalcanal was founded in 1995 and serves the three dioceses. It is under the care of the Congregation of the Mission (Vincentian Fathers and Brothers).

The bishops of the Solomon Islands are represented in the Catholic Bishops Conference of Papua New Guinea and Solomon Islands.

== See also ==
- Religion in Solomon Islands
