= Religion in Solomon Islands =

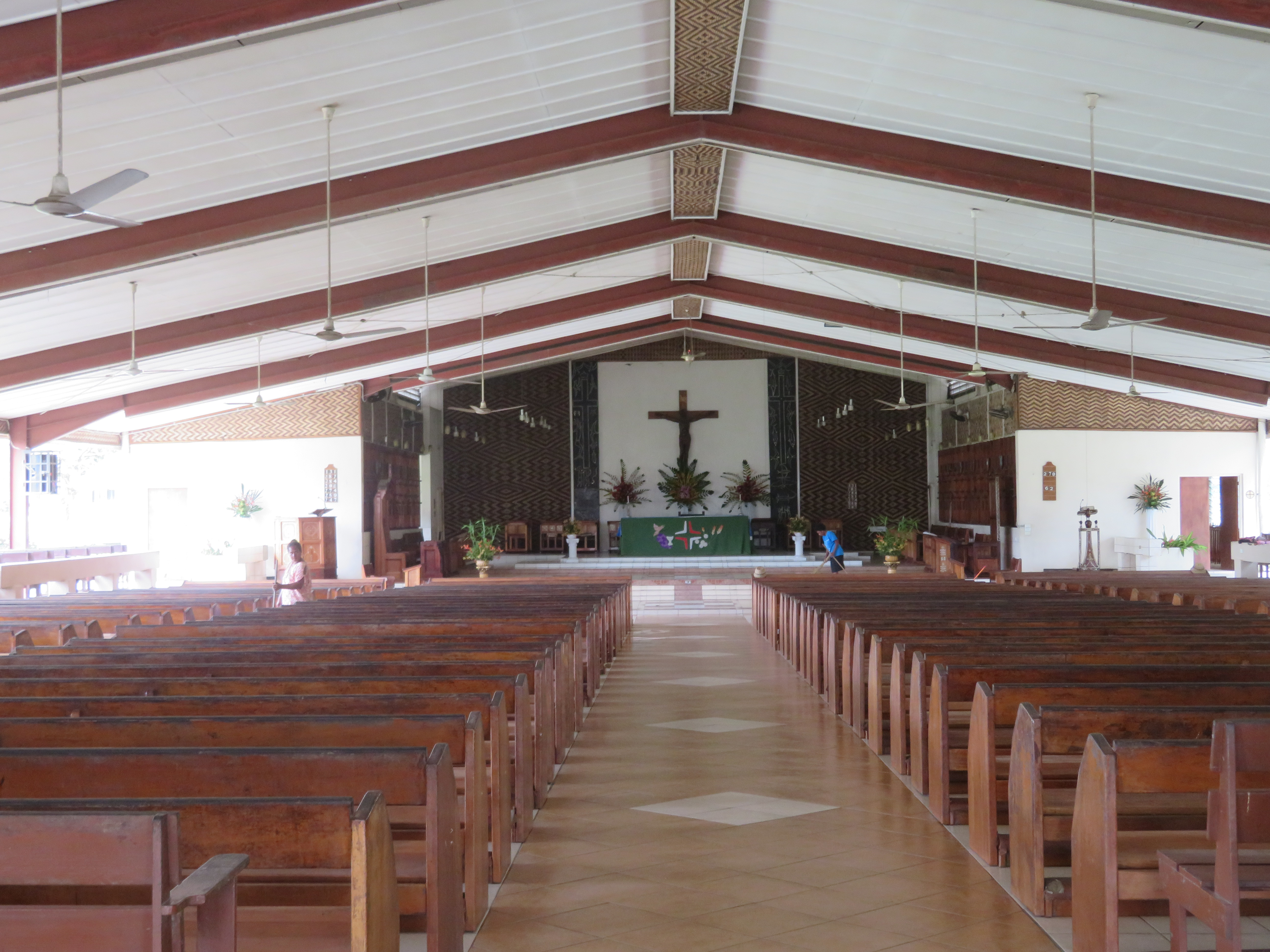
The interior of St. Barnabas Anglican Cathedral in the capital Honiara.

Christianity is the predominant religion in Solomon Islands, with Anglicanism (Church of Melanesia) being the single largest denomination.

The constitution of Solomon Islands establishes the freedom of religion, and this freedom is respected in practice by both the government and general society.

== Demographics ==
Religion in Solomon Islands (2018)
1. Anglican (31%)
2. Roman Catholic (19%)
3. Evangelical (17%)
4. Seventh-day Adventist (12%)
5. United Methodist (10%)
6. Other Christian (4%)
7. Indigenous & Animistic (5%)
8. Other (2%)

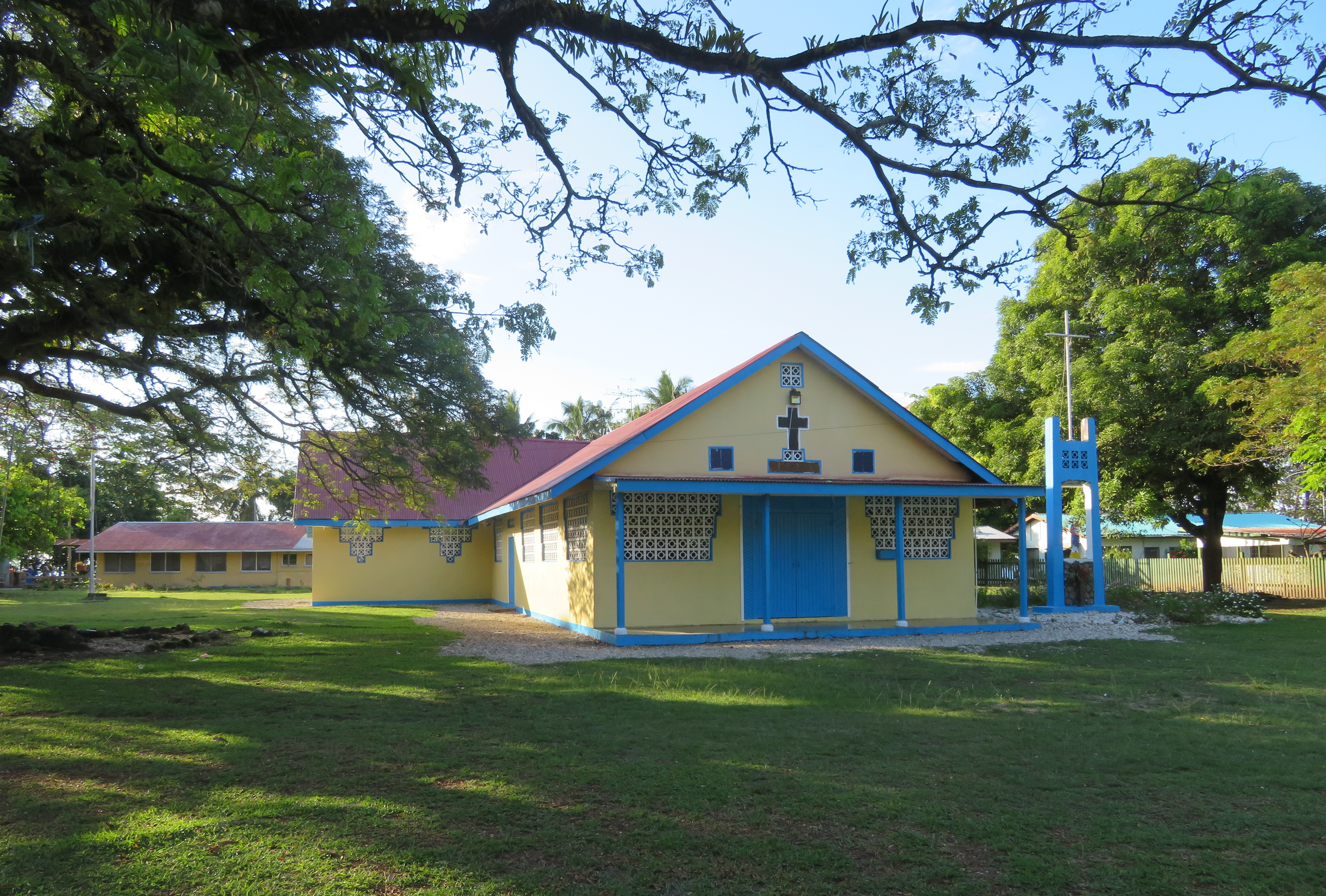
Catholic Church in Tanagai on Guadalcanal

Religious makeup of the population of Solomon Islands as of 2019:

- Christianity 93%
  - Protestant 73%
    - Anglican Church of Melanesia 32%
    - South Seas Evangelical Church 17%
    - Seventh-day Adventist Church 12%
    - United Methodists 10%
  - Catholic Church 20%
- Animism 5%
- Other 3%

'Other' groups include Jehovah’s Witnesses, The Church of Jesus Christ of Latter-day Saints, the Family Federation for World Peace and Unification (Unification Church) and the Christian Fellowship Church, as well as Muslims and Baha’is.

An estimated 5 percent of the population, consisting primarily of the Kwaio community on the island of Malaita, practice indigenous animistic religions.

Christianity was brought to the country in the 19th and early 20th centuries by missionaries representing several Western denominations. Some foreign missionaries continue to work in the country. In the early 2000s, the clergy of the established churches was nearly entirely indigenous, except for the Roman Catholic Church, whose clergy is approximately 45 percent foreign.

== Religious freedom ==
The constitution of Solomon Islands establishes the freedom of religion, although it also allows for this freedom to be curtailed when "reasonably required" by other laws.

All religious organizations are required to register with the government.

The public school curriculum includes an hour of optional weekly religious education, with the content determined by the Solomon Islands Christian Association. Non-Christian religious instruction is available by request. The government subsidizes schools and health centers operated by religious organizations, in addition to providing small grants to religious organizations.

In 2023, the country was scored 4 out of 4 by Freedom House for religious freedom.

== See also ==
- Melanesian Brotherhood
- Roman Catholicism in Solomon Islands
- Islam in Solomon Islands
