= Dignitas personae =

2008 Roman Catholic document on biomedical issues

Dignitas Personae is the title of a 2008 instruction by the Congregation for the Doctrine of the Faith giving doctrinal directives on certain embryonic ethical controversies that had emerged since 1987, after Donum Vitae was released. The document was signed by William Levada and Luis Ladaria Ferrer on June 20, 2008 with the approval of Pope Benedict XVI. Also Elio Sgreccia collaborated in the redaction of the document.

The document takes a critical stance against selective reduction, prenatal diagnosis, preimplantation diagnosis, in vitro fertilization, cryopreservation, embryo transfer, some forms of genetic engineering, embryo donation, which have been criticized as unethical by anti-abortion ethicists because they provoke the termination of embryonic cell reproduction.

The doctrinal material is not only addressed to Catholic couples, but also to pharmacists, doctors, ethicists, theologians, politicians and industrialists so that they may try to tackle these issues together. Other related documents, such as Humanae Vitae, were also written for a wide variety of individuals and specialists on the matter.

Dignitas Personae also reiterates Church opposition to contraception and abortion, mentioning new methods of birth control such as female condoms and the morning-after pill.
