= Roman Catholic Diocese of Auki =

Roman Catholic diocese in the Solomon Islands

Coordinates: 8.7659°S 160.6970°E

Diocese of Auki Dioecesis Aukina

Location
- Country: Solomon Islands
- Metropolitan: Archdiocese of Honiara
- Headquarters: Auki, Malaita Province, Solomon Islands

Statistics
- Area: 4,234 km^{2} (1,635 sq mi)
- Population: Total; Catholics: (as of 2023); 164,345; 51,836 (31.5%)
- Parishes: 13

Information
- Denomination: Catholic Church
- Sui iuris church: Latin Church
- Rite: Roman Rite
- Established: 17 December 1982; 43 years ago
- Secular priests: 34 (all Diocesan)

Current leadership
- Pope: Leo XIV
- Bishop: Jacob Aba, S.M.
- Metropolitan Archbishop: Christopher Cardone, O.P.

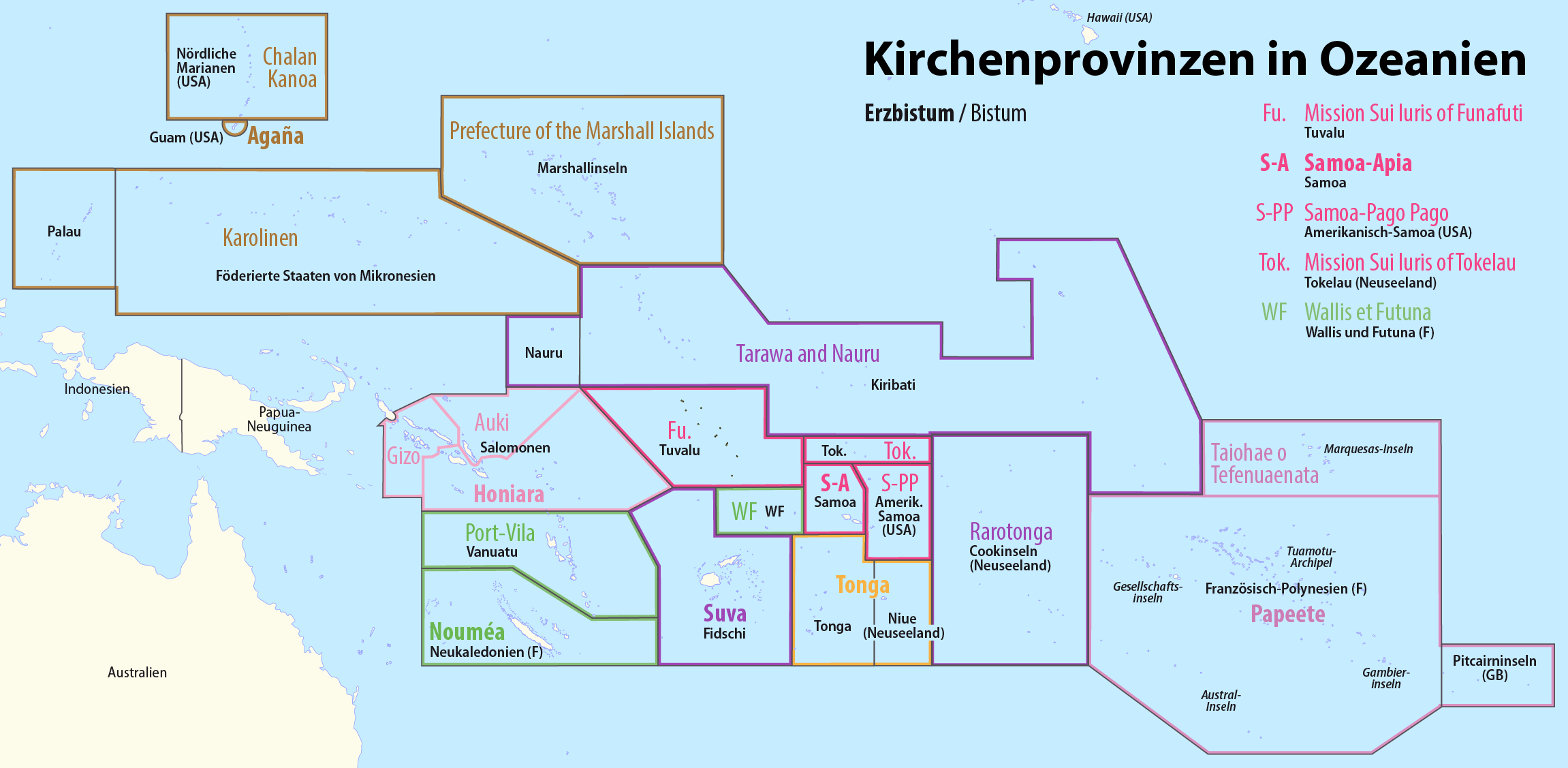

The Roman Catholic Diocese of Auki is a suffragan diocese of the Roman Catholic Archdiocese of Honiara in Solomon Islands. It was erected in 1982 from part of the archdiocese.

== Bishops ==
- Gerard Francis Loft, S.M. (5 December 1983 – 19 October 2004), resigned
- Christopher Michael Cardone, O.P. (19 October 2004 – 22 June 2016), appointed Archbishop of Honiara
- Peter Houhou (3 July 2018 – 16 June 2023), appointed Bishop of Gizo
- Jacob Aba, S.M. (28 October 2025 – Present)

== External links and references ==
- "Diocese of Auki". Catholic-Hierarchy.
