= Roman Catholic Archdiocese of Honiara =

Latin Catholic jurisdiction in the Solomon Islands

Coordinates: 9.4400°S 159.9500°E

Archdiocese of Honiara Archidioecesis Honiarana
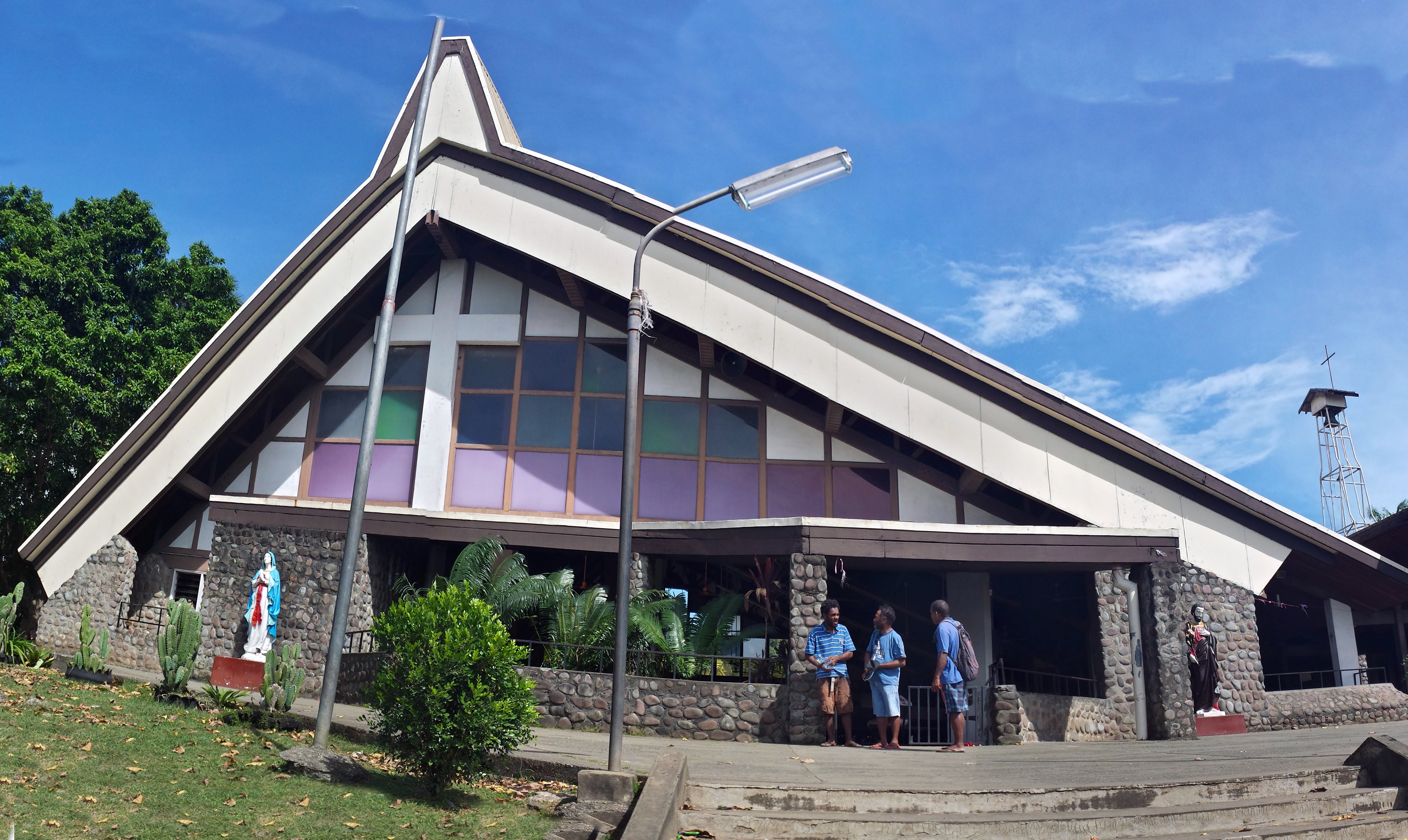

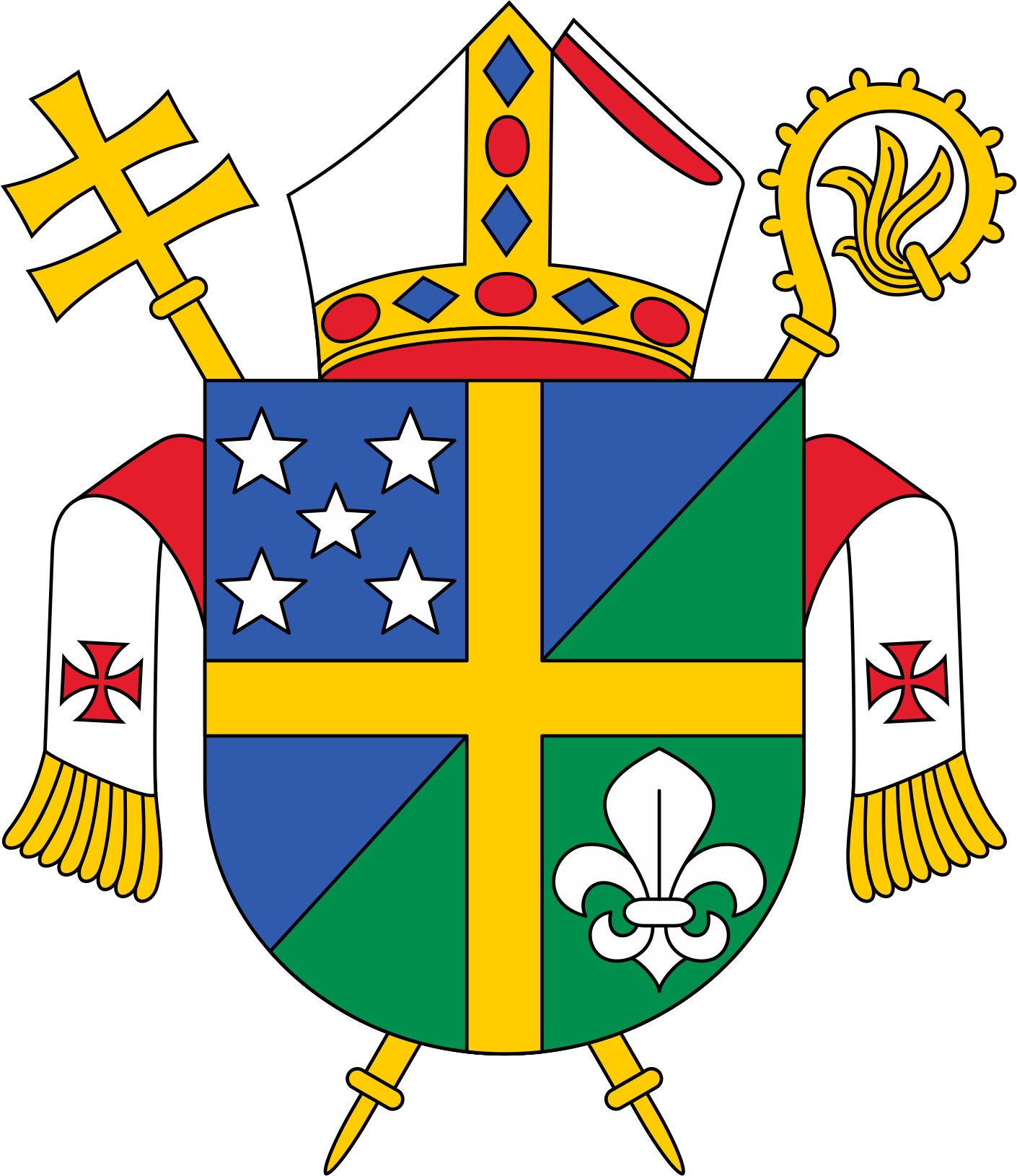
- Coat of arms

Location
- Country: Solomon Islands
- Ecclesiastical province: Honiara

Statistics
- Area: 10,728 km^{2} (4,142 sq mi)
- Population: Total; Catholics: (as of 2021); 292,000; 65,783 (22.5%)
- Parishes: 14

Information
- Denomination: Catholic Church
- Sui iuris church: Latin Church
- Rite: Roman Rite
- Established: 1897: Prefecture Apostolic of the English Solomon Islands; 1912: Vicariate Apostolic of the Southern Solomon Islands; 1966: Diocese of Honiara; 1978: Archdiocese of Honiara
- Cathedral: Holy Cross Cathedral
- Secular priests: 15

Current leadership
- Pope: Leo XIV
- Metropolitan Archbishop: Christopher Cardone, O.P.
- Bishops emeritus: Adrian Smith, S.M.

The Archdiocese of Honiara is a Latin Church ecclesiastical territory or archdiocese of the Catholic Church in the Solomon Islands. It is the successor of the apostolic prefecture of the British Solomon Islands, which was erected in 1897. The ecclesiastical province of Honiara was created in 1978, the first such creation of Pope John Paul II, and contains two suffragan sees: Gizo (1966, formerly the Vicariate Apostolic of Western Solomon Islands) and Auki (1982).

Holy Cross Cathedral in the episcopal see of Honiara on the island of Guadalcanal houses the cathedra of the archdiocese. It was dedicated on 17 September 1978 by then-Bishop Daniel Stuyvenberg, S.M.

New York-born Archbishop Christopher Cardone, O.P. was appointed on 22 June 2016 to replace Dubliner Archbishop Adrian Smith S.M., who presented his resignation on reaching the age limit after some 32 years as Archbishop of Honiara.

== History ==
The first Christians to arrive in the Solomon Islands were Spanish. The explorer Álavaro de Mendaña de Neyra arrived on the island of Santa Isabel on 9 February 1568 and claimed the territory for Spain. Since 1568 was a thousand years after Venantius Fortunatus, Bishop of Poitiers, had composed the great hymn to the holy cross, Vexilla Regis, the explorers erected a cross on Santa Isabel Island - the explorers' devotion endures in the patronage of the Holy Cross of the present-day cathedral. The first Mass in the south Pacific was celebrated by a Franciscan missionary who had travelled with Mendaña. The explorer returned to the islands in 1595 but failed to establish a successful colony and the Spanish left definitively for Peru.

French Marists were sent in 1837 to the South Pacific by their founder, Jean-Claude Colin, at the insistence of Pope Gregory XVI. The first bishop in Melanesia, Bishop Jean-Baptiste Épalle, was mortally wounded three days after his arrival at San Cristobal, after he had refused to gift his episcopal ring to a hostile tribe. Shortly after the assassination of Bishop Épalle, the Marist Fathers established the first mission station at Makira Bay. There Fr Verguet learned the local language, Kahua, and wrote a basic catechism for the locals. The new bishop, Jean George Collomb, decided to quit San Cristobal for the deaths of three priests to Malaria, and to set up the mission in Woodlark.

It was Pope Leo XIII who established the first diocesan level structure in the Solomon Islands. His bull dated 27 July 1897 erected the Prefecture Apostolic of the British Solomon Islands, dividing it from Apostolic Vicariate of New Pomerania as previously asked by its bishop, Louis Couppé. The first and only Prefect Apostolic of the British Solomon Islands was the French Marist missionary, Bishop Julien Vidal SM, titular bishop of Abydus and Vicar Apostolic of Fiji Island. Vidal resigned in 1903, to provide for the promotion of the entity to a vicariate apostolic under the name Vicariate Apostolic of the Southern Solomon Islands, with another Marist as bishop, Jean-Ephrem Bertreux. The Vicariate Apostolic was further established as a diocese in 1966, and as a metropolitan archdiocese with suffragan Gizo in 1978.

Pope John Paul II, who had erected the Province of Honiara in 1978, made a pastoral visit to the Archdiocese on 9 May 1984.

== Geography ==
The territory of the Archdiocese has been largely left unchanged since the erection of the Diocese of Auki in 1982. It includes the five Provinces of Guadalcanal, Makira-Ulawa, Temotu, Central Islands, Rennell and Belona, and the area governed by the Honiara Town Council.

== Statistical Profile ==
The Archdiocese is responsible for some 65,783 Catholics, who represent 22.5% of the local population. 35 diocesan and religious priests with 123 religious in the 11 religious congregations present serve in its 14 parishes and other apostolates. The Archdiocese also hosts the provincial seminary, Holy Name of Mary Seminary Tenaru, which was founded in 1995.

== Cathedral ==
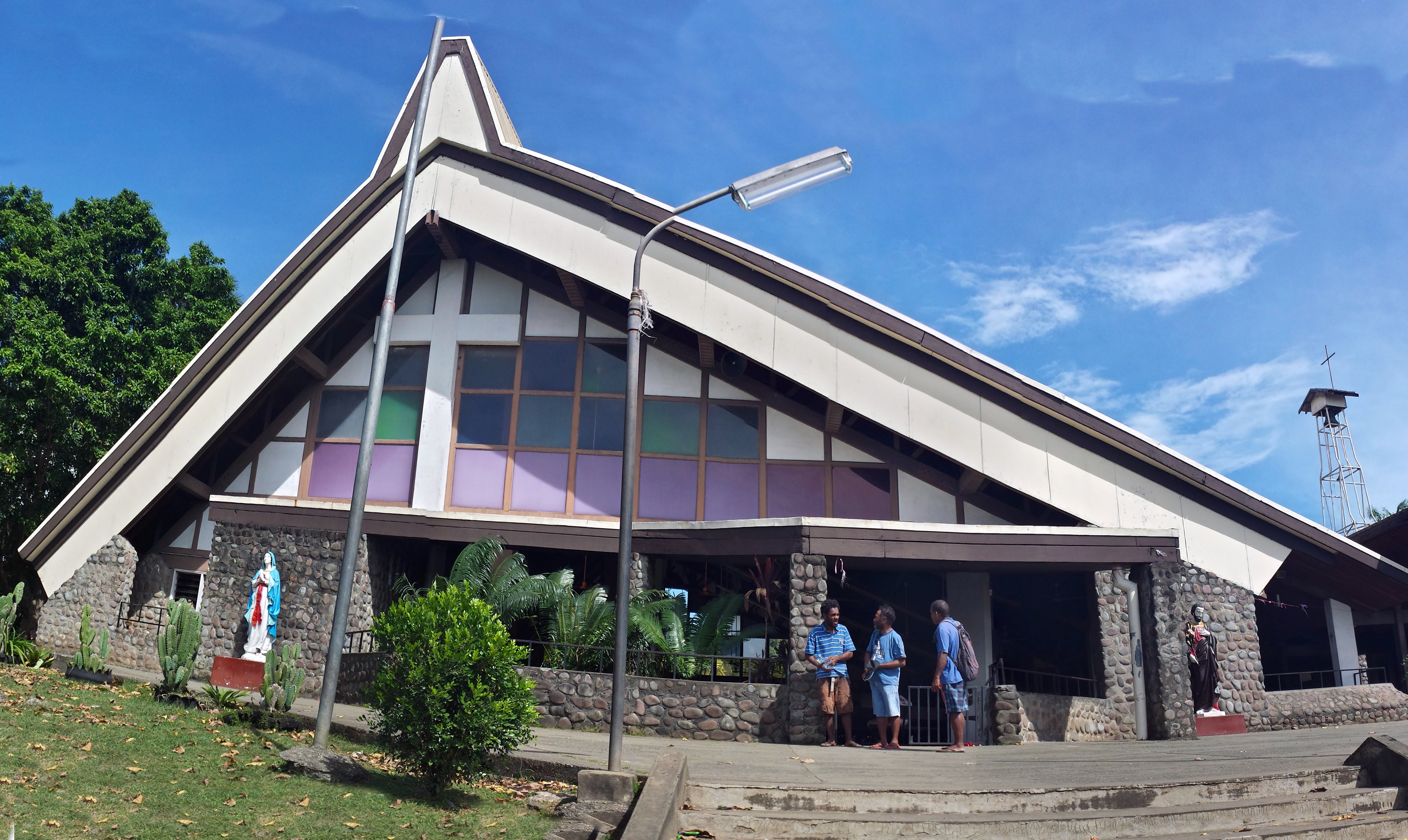
Holy Cross Cathedral, Honiara

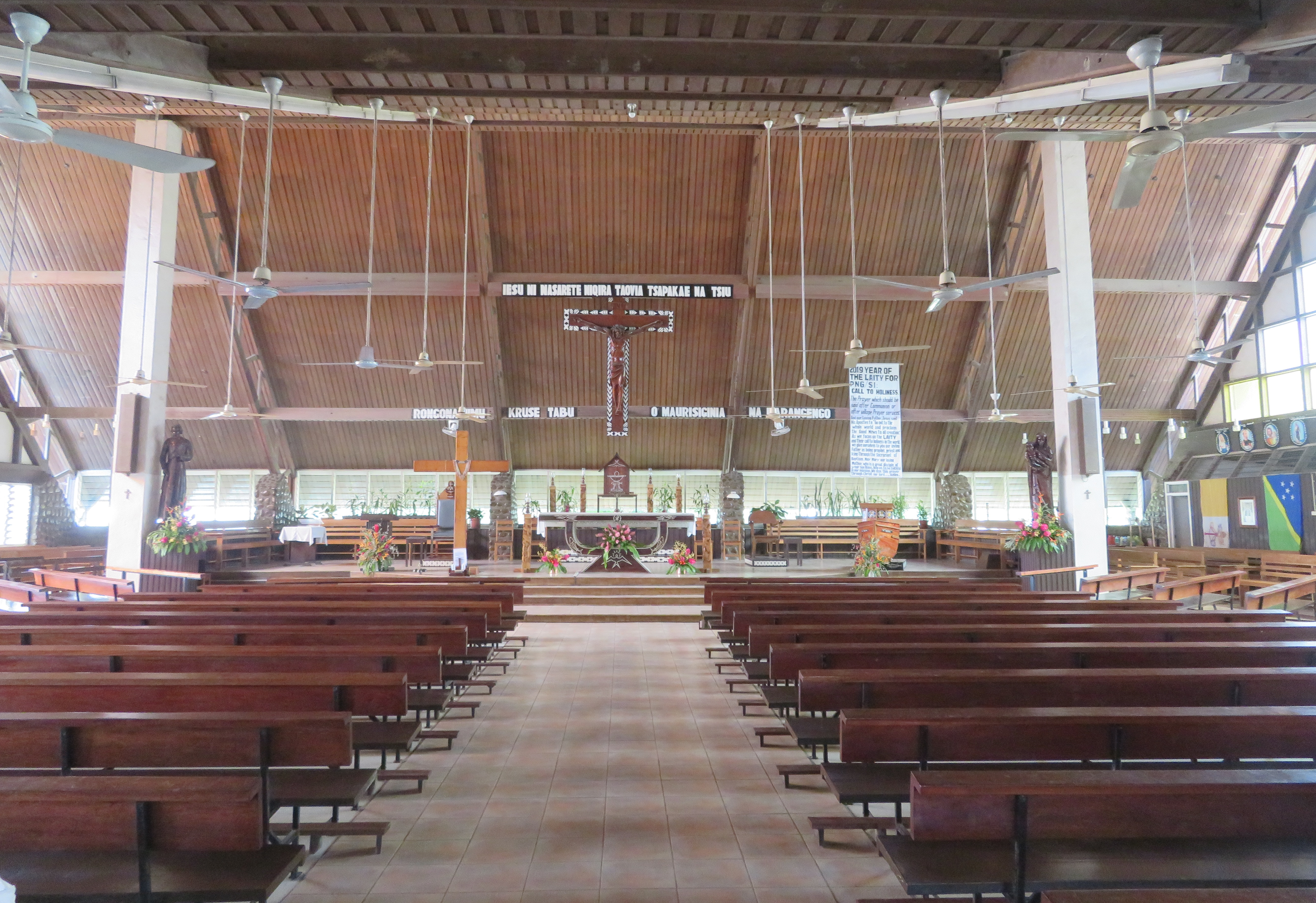
Holy Cross Cathedral, Honiara

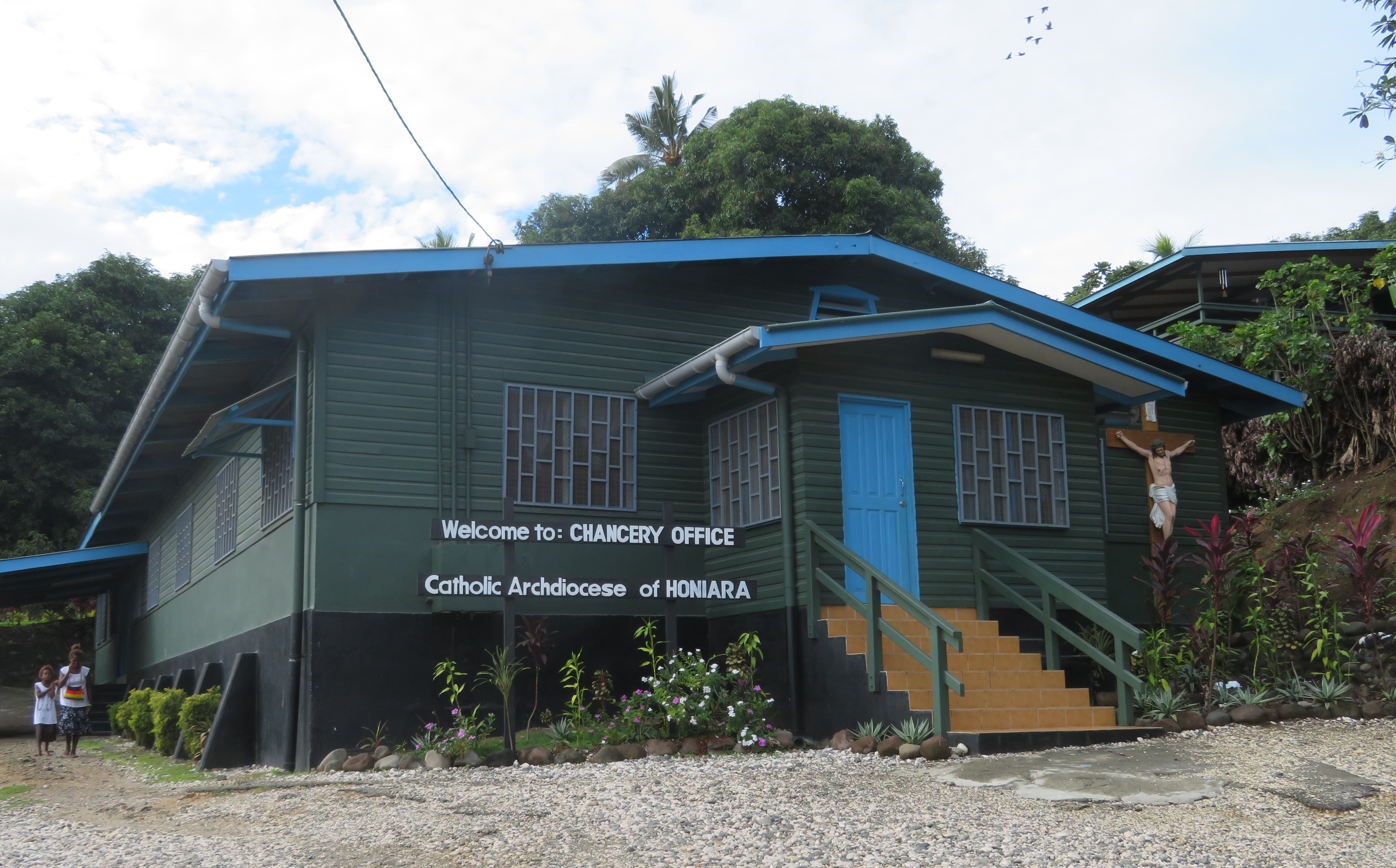
Chancery Office

Holy Cross Cathedral, Honiara, stands on the site where it is thought that the Spanish explorer Mendaña erected a cross when he arrived in 1568. Thus had the explorer given Honiara its first name, Santa Cruz. A large church intended to be used for episcopal ceremonial was erected at Visale in 1923, but it and the remains of the murdered Bishop Épalle which had been interred there were lost to earthquake in 1930. From that time Bishop Aubin based his operations at Tanagai.

The American development of Honiara as an army base and war depot turned Honiara into the new capital for the British Solomon Islands. The Catholic population tripled between 1947 and 1957, from 1000 to 3000. The first Holy Cross Church, built in 1947, was replaced by a much larger structure in 1957. The statues of the Blessed Virgin and St Joseph, which had somehow survived the Japanese air raids of the Battle of Guadalcanal, were positioned outside the 1957 church. These statues were re-positioned once again outside the 1978 cathedral; damage caused by bullets can be easily seen on both.

Bishop Daniel Stuyvenberg SM began planning for a new cathedral for the Diocese in 1975. He appointed Melbourne architect Noel McKernan, and laid the foundation stone on 14 September 1976 and solemnly dedicated it on 17 September 1978.

McKernan's contemporary design is reminiscent of the tent-like structure which it replaced. A self-taught local woodcarver, Frank Haikiu, was engaged for the manufacture of the altar, tabernacle, crucifix, font, way of the cross, and statues of the Blessed Virgin and St Joseph. Haikiu also carved a Suffering Christ (now in St Joseph's Secondary School, Tenaru), an altar for the Marist community in Tanagai, and a Martyrdom of St Peter Chanel for Our Lady of Lourdes and St Peter Chanel Church in Hull UK.

== Ordinaries ==
1. Julien Vidal SM - Prefect Apostolic of the Southern Solomon Islands (1897–1903)
2. Jean-Ephrem Bertreux SM - Prefect Apostolic of the Southern Solomon Islands (1903–1912), Vicar Apostolic of the Southern Solomon Islands (1912–1919)
3. Louis-Marie Raucaz SM - Vicar Apostolic of the Southern Solomon Islands (1920–1934)
4. Jean-Marie Aubin SM - Vicar Apostolic of the Southern Solomon Islands (1935–1958)
5. Daniel Willem Stuyvenberg SM - Vicar Apostolic of the Southern Solomon Islands (1958–1966), Bishop of Honiara (1966–1978), Archbishop and Metropolitan of Honiara (1978–1984, installed 25 March 1979)
6. Adrian Thomas Smith SM - Archbishop and Metropolitan of Honiara (1984–2016)
7. Christopher Michael Cardone OP - Archbishop and Metropolitan of Honiara (2016–present)

== Other affiliated bishops ==
=== Auxiliary Bishops ===
1. Peter Kurongku - Auxiliary Bishop (consecrated 25 March 1979, promoted to Archbishop of Port Moresby 3 October 1981)
2. Adrian Thomas Smith SM - Auxiliary Bishop (consecrated 24 April 1983, promoted to Archbishop here 3 December 1984)
3. John Doaninoel SM - Auxiliary Bishop (appointed 9 June 2011 - formerly Auxiliary Bishop of Rabaul; died 7 August 2018)

=== Other priest of this diocese who became bishop ===
- Peter Houhou, appointed Bishop of Auki 3 July 2018

== Sources and external links ==
- A brief history of the Archdiocese of Honiara
- GigaCatholic with incumbent biography links
- [www.catholicchurchsolomonislands.com/Holy%20Cross%20Cathedral%20SI.pdf History of Holy Cross Cathedral, Honiara]
