= Christopher Cardone =

American archbishop

His Excellency, The Most Reverend Christopher Michael Cardone OP
- Metropolitan Archbishop of Honiara, The Solomon Islands
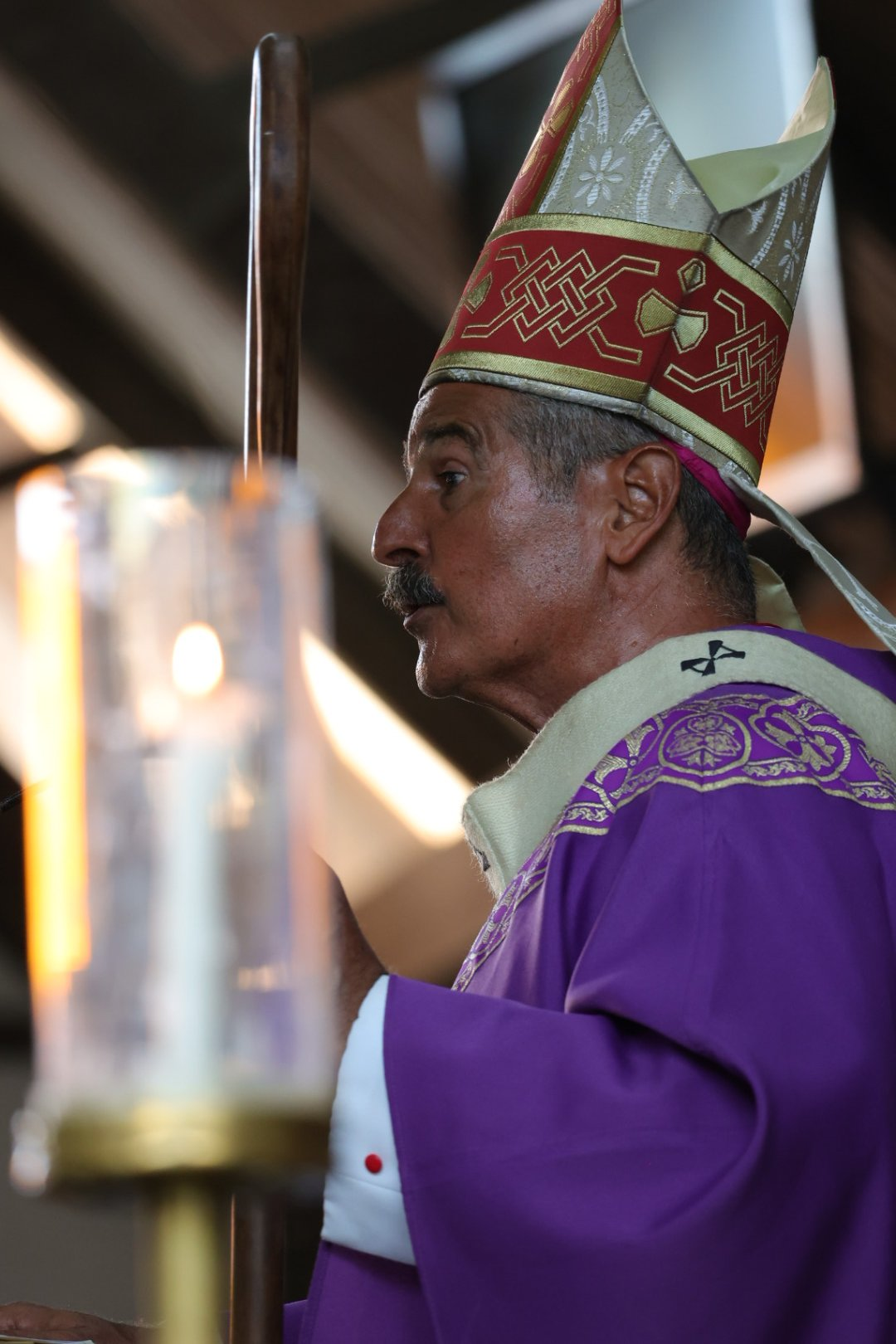
- Cardone in 2022
- Church: Catholic Church
- Archdiocese: Archdiocese of Honiara
- Appointed: June 22, 2016
- Installed: September 10, 2016
- Previous post: Bishop of Auki (2014–2016)

Orders
- Ordination: May 30, 1986
- Consecration: June 9, 2001 by Bernard O'Grady, OP, Brian James Barnes, OFM, and Eusebius John Crawford, OP

Personal details
- Born: December 20, 1957 (age 68) Long Island, New York
- Motto: Serving the Lord with gladness

Styles of Christopher Michael Cardone
- Reference style: His Excellency; The Most Reverend
- Spoken style: Your Excellency
- Religious style: Archbishop

Christopher Michael Cardone, OP (born December 20, 1957) is an American Catholic prelate who has served as Archbishop of Honiara in the Solomon Islands since 2016. He is a member of the Dominican Order.

== Biography ==
=== Early life and education ===
Christopher Cardone was born on December 20, 1957, on Long Island, New York and graduated from Chaminade High School in 1976. He attended Providence College and made his religious profession to the Dominican Order on August 15, 1981. He completed his studies at the Dominican House of Studies in Washington, D.C.

=== Priestly ministry ===
Cardone was ordained as a Dominican priest on May 30, 1986. After his ordination, Cardone served for two years as a parish priest at St. Gertrude Parish in Madeira, Ohio. In 1988, Cardone moved to the Dominican vicariate in the Solomon Islands. He held positions on the island of Gizo as a parish priest in Nila and Nora; pastor of St. Peter's Parish in Gizo, and as director of vocations for the Diocese of Gizo.

=== Episcopal ministry ===
Cardone was appointed titular bishop of Thuburnica and as an auxiliary bishop for the Diocese of Gizo on March 27, 2001, by Pope John Paul II. Bishop Bernard C. O'Grady consecrated Cardone on June 9, 2001. Cardone was appointed Bishop of Auki on Oct 19, 2004, by Pope John Paul II.

Cardone made an ad limina visit to Pope Benedict XVI in Rome as a member of the delegation from Papua New Guinea and the Solomon Islands on June 26, 2005. Cardone was appointed Archbishop of Honiara by Pope Francis on June 22, 2016. He was installed on September 10, 2016.

== See also ==
- Catholic Church hierarchy
- Catholic Church in the United States
- Historical list of the Catholic bishops of the United States
- List of Catholic bishops of the United States
- Lists of patriarchs, archbishops, and bishops
