= Comparison of birth control methods =

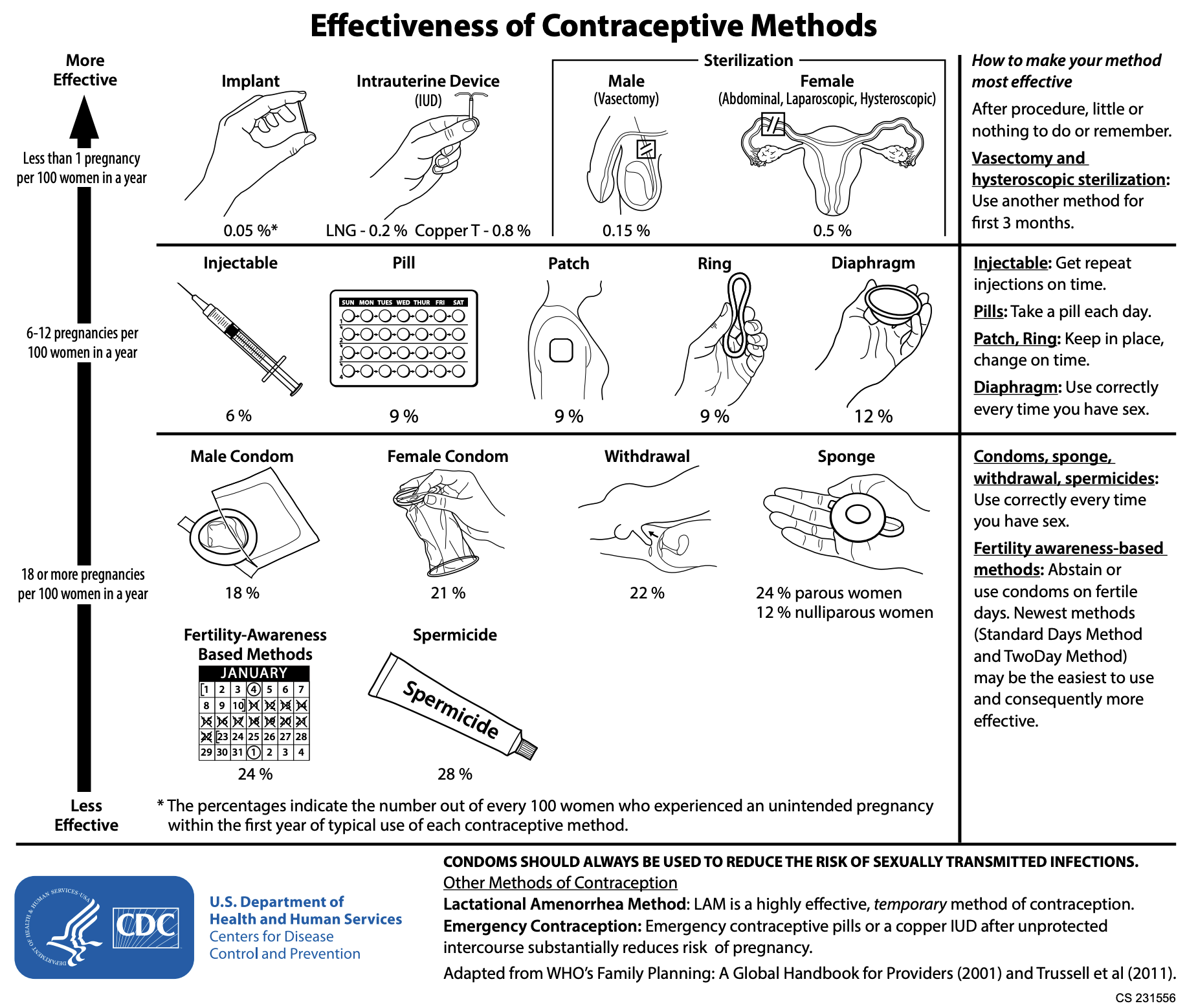
Effectiveness of contraceptive methods with respect to birth control. Only condoms are useful to prevent sexually transmitted infections.

There are many methods of birth control (or contraception) that vary in requirements, side effects, and effectiveness. As the technology, education, and awareness about contraception has evolved, new contraception methods have been theorized and put in application. Although no method of birth control is ideal for every user, some methods remain more effective, affordable or intrusive than others. Outlined here are the different types of barrier methods, hormonal methods, various methods including spermicides, emergency contraceptives, and surgical methods and a comparison between them.

While many methods may prevent conception, only male and female condoms are effective in preventing sexually transmitted infections.

== Methods ==
=== Hormonal methods ===
The IUD (intrauterine device) is a T-shaped device that is inserted into the uterus by a trained medical professional. There are two different types of IUDs: copper or hormonal. The copper IUD (also known as a copper T intrauterine device) is a non-hormonal option of birth control. It is wrapped in copper which creates a toxic environment for sperm and eggs, thus preventing pregnancy. The failure rate of a copper IUD is approximately 0.8% and can prevent pregnancy for up to 10 years. The hormonal IUD (also known as levonorgestrel intrauterine system or LNg IUD) releases a small amount of the hormone called progestin that can prevent pregnancy for 3–8 years with a failure rate of 0.1-0.4%. IUDs can be removed by a trained medical professional at any time before the expiration date to allow for pregnancy.

Oral contraceptives are another option, these are commonly known as 'the pill'. These must be taken at the same time every day in order to be the most effective. There are two different options, there is a combined pill that contains both of the hormones estrogen and progestin, and a progestin-only pill. The failure rate of each of these oral contraceptives is 7%.

Some choose to get an injection or a shot in order to prevent pregnancy. This is an option where a medical professional will inject the hormone progestin into a woman's arm or buttocks every 3 months to prevent pregnancy. The failure rate is 4%.

Women can also get an implant into their upper arm that releases small amounts of hormones to prevent pregnancy. The implant is a thin rod-shaped device that contains the hormone progestin that is inserted into the upper arm and can prevent pregnancy for up to 3 years. The failure rate for this method is 0.1%.

The patch is another simple option; it is a skin patch containing the hormones progestin and estrogen that is absorbed into the bloodstream preventing pregnancy. The patch is typically worn on the lower abdomen and replaced once a week. The failure rate for this is 7%.

The hormonal vaginal contraceptive ring is a ring that contains the hormones progestin and estrogen that a woman inserts into the vagina. It is replaced once a month and has a failure rate of 7%.

=== Barrier methods ===
The male condom is typically made of latex (but other materials are available, such as lambskin, if either partner has a latex allergy). The male condom is placed over the male's penis and prevents the sperm and semen from entering the partner's body. It can prevent pregnancy, and STIs such as, but not limited to, HIV if used appropriately. Male condoms are disposable (each condom can only be used once) and are easily accessible at local stores in most countries. Condoms have a failure rate of 2% when used correctly during every act of intercourse, and 13% when used 'typically', which includes cases where they are used inconsistently or incorrectly.

The diaphragm or cervical cap is a small shallow cup-like cap that is inserted into the vagina with spermicide to cover the cervix and block sperm from entering the uterus. It is inserted before sexual intercourse and comes in different sizes. It needs to be fitted by a medical professional. It has a failure rate of 17%.

A contraceptive sponge is another contraceptive method Like the diaphragm, the contraceptive sponge contains spermicide and is inserted into the vagina and placed over the cervix to prevent sperm from entering the uterus. The sponge must be kept in place 6 hours after sexual intercourse before it can be removed and discarded. The failure rate for women who have had a baby before is 27%; for those who have not had a baby, the failure rate is 14%.

The female condom is worn by the woman; it is inserted into the vagina and prevents the sperm from entering her body. It can help prevent STIs and can be inserted up to 8 hours before intercourse. The failure rate is 21%.

=== Other methods ===
Spermicides come in various forms such as: gels, foams, creams, film, suppositories, or tablets. The spermicides create an environment in which sperm can no longer live. Though typically used in addition to the male condom, diaphragm, or cervical cap, they can also be used by themselves. They are put into the vagina no more than an hour before intercourse and kept inside the vagina for 6–8 hours after intercourse. The failure rate is 21%.

In the fertility awareness-based method a woman who has a predictable and consistent menstrual cycle tracks the days that she is fertile. The typical woman has approximately 9 fertile days a month and either avoids intercourse on those days or uses an alternative birth control method for that period of time. The failure rate is between 2-23%.

Lactational amenorrhea (LAM) is an option for women who have had a baby within the past 6 months and are breastfeeding. This method is only successful if it has been less than 6 months since the birth of the baby, they must be fully breastfeeding their baby, and not having any periods. The method is almost as effective as an oral contraceptive if the 3 conditions are strictly followed.

The 'pull out method' or coitus interruptus is a method where the male will remove his penis from the vagina before ejaculating; this prevents sperm from reaching the egg and can prevent pregnancy. This method has to be done correctly every time and is best if used in addition to other forms of birth control. It has a failure rate of approximately 22%.

=== Emergency contraceptives ===
A copper IUD can be used as an emergency contraceptive as long as it is inserted within 5 days after intercourse.

There are two different types of emergency contraceptive pills. One contains levonorgestrel and can prevent pregnancy if taken within 3 days of intercourse. The other contains ulipristal acetate and can prevent pregnancy if taken within 5 days of intercourse. This option can be used if other birth control methods fail.

Use of an emergency contraceptive should occur as soon as possible after unprotected sexual intercourse to reduce the chance of pregnancy.

=== Surgical methods ===
Tubal ligation is also known as 'tying tubes'. This is the surgical process where medical professional closes or ties the fallopian tubes in order to prevent sperm from reaching the eggs. This is often done as an outpatient surgical procedure and is effective immediately after it is performed. The failure rate is 0.5%.

A vasectomy is a minor surgical procedure where a doctor will cut the vas deferens and seal the ends to prevent sperm from reaching the penis and ultimately the egg. The method is usually successful after 12 weeks post-procedure or when the sperm count is zero. The failure rate is 0.15%.

== User dependence ==
Different methods require different levels of diligence by users. Methods with little or nothing to do or remember, or that require a clinic visit less than once per year are said to be non-user dependent, forgettable, or top-tier methods. Intrauterine methods, implants, and sterilization fall into this category. For methods that are not user dependent, the actual and perfect-use failure rates are very similar.

Many hormonal methods of birth control, and LAM require a moderate level of thoughtfulness. For many hormonal methods, clinic visits must be made every three months to a year to renew the prescription. The pill must be taken every day, the patch must be reapplied weekly, or the ring must be replaced monthly. Injections are required every 12 weeks. The rules for LAM must be followed every day. Both LAM and hormonal methods provide a reduced level of protection against pregnancy if they are occasionally used incorrectly (rarely going longer than 4–6 hours between breastfeeds, a late pill or injection, or forgetting to replace a patch or ring on time). The actual failure rates for LAM and hormonal methods are somewhat higher than the perfect-use failure rates.

Higher levels of user commitment are required for other methods. Barrier methods, coitus interruptus, and spermicides must be used at every act of intercourse. Fertility awareness-based methods may require daily tracking of the menstrual cycle. The actual failure rates for these methods may be much higher than the perfect-use failure rates.

== Side effects ==
Different forms of birth control have different potential side effects. Not all, or even most, users will experience side effects from a method. The less effective the method, the greater the risk of pregnancy, and the side effects associated with pregnancy.

Minimal or no side effects occur with coitus interruptus, fertility awareness-based, and LAM. Some forms of periodic abstinence encourage examination of the cervix; insertion of the fingers into the vagina to perform this examination may cause changes in the vaginal environment. Following the rules for LAM may delay a woman's first post-partum menstruation beyond what would be expected from different breastfeeding practices.

Barrier methods have a risk of allergic reactions. Users sensitive to latex may use barriers made of less allergenic materials - polyurethane condoms, or silicone diaphragms, for example. Barrier methods are also often combined with spermicides, which have possible side effects of genital irritation, vaginal infection, and urinary tract infection.

Sterilization procedures are generally considered to have a low risk of side effects, though some persons and organizations disagree. Female sterilization is a more significant operation than vasectomy, and has greater risks; in industrialized nations, mortality is 4 per 100,000 tubal ligations, versus 0.1 per 100,000 vasectomies.

After IUD insertion, users may experience irregular periods in the first 3–6 months with Mirena, and sometimes heavier periods and worse menstrual cramps with ParaGard. However, continuation rates are much higher with IUDs compared to non-long-acting methods. A positive characteristic of IUDs is that fertility and the ability to become pregnant returns quickly once the IUD is removed.

Because of their systemic nature, hormonal methods have the largest number of possible side effects. Combined hormonal contraceptives contain estrogen and progestin hormones. They can come in formulations such as pills, vaginal rings, and transdermal patches. Most people who use combined hormonal contraception experience breakthrough bleeding within the first 3 months. Other common side effects include headaches, breast tenderness, and changes in mood. Side effects from hormonal contraceptives typically disappear over time (3-5 months) with consistent use. Less common effects of combined hormonal contraceptives include increasing the risk of deep vein thrombosis to 2-10 per 10,000 women per year and venous thrombotic events (see venous thrombosis) to 7-10 per 10,000 women per year.

Hormonal contraceptives can come in multiple forms including injectables. Depot medroxyprogesterone acetate (DMPA), a progestin-only injectable, has been found to cause amenorrhea (cessation of menstruation); however, the irregular bleeding pattern returns to normal over time. DMPA has also been associated with weight gain. Other side effects more commonly associated with progestin-only products include acne and hirsutism. Compared to combined hormonal contraceptives, progestin-only contraceptives typically produce a more regular bleeding pattern.

=== Sexually transmitted infection prevention ===
Male and female condoms provide significant protection against sexually transmitted infections (STIs) when used consistently and correctly. They also provide some protection against cervical cancer. Condoms are often recommended as an adjunct to more effective birth control methods (such as IUD) in situations where STI protection is also desired.

Other barrier methods, such as diaphragms may provide limited protection against infections in the upper genital tract. Other methods provide little or no protection against sexually transmitted infections.

== Effectiveness ==
=== Cost and cost-effectiveness ===
Family planning is among the most cost-effective of all health interventions. Costs of contraceptives include method costs (including supplies, office visits, training), cost of method failure (ectopic pregnancy, spontaneous abortion, induced abortion, birth, child care expenses) and cost of side effects. Contraception saves money by reducing unintended pregnancies and reducing transmission of sexually transmitted infections. By comparison, in the US, method related costs vary from nothing to about $1,000 for a year or more for reversible contraception.

During the initial five years, vasectomy is comparable in cost to the IUD. Vasectomy is much less expensive and safer than tubal ligation. Since ecological breastfeeding and fertility awareness are behavioral they cost nothing or a small amount upfront for a thermometer or training. Fertility awareness based methods can be used throughout a woman's reproductive lifetime.

Not using contraceptives is the most expensive option. While in that case there are no method related costs, it has the highest failure rate, and thus the highest failure related costs. Even if one only considers medical costs relating to preconception care and birth, any method of contraception saves money compared to using no method.

The most effective and the most cost-effective methods are long-acting methods. Unfortunately these methods often have significant up-front costs, and requiring the user to pay a portion of these costs prevents some from using more effective methods. Contraception saves money for the public health system and insurers.

=== Effectiveness calculation ===
Failure rates may be calculated by either the Pearl Index or a life table method. A "perfect-use" rate is where all rules of the method are rigorously followed, and (if applicable) the method is used for every act of intercourse.

Actual failure rates are higher than perfect-use rates for a variety of reasons:

- Mistakes on the part of those providing instructions on how to use the method.
- Inconsistent use of the method
- Mistakes on the part of the method's users.
- Conscious user non-compliance with the method.
- Insurance providers sometimes impede access to medications (e.g. require prescription refills monthly).

For instance, someone using oral forms of hormonal birth control might be given incorrect information by a health care provider as to the frequency of intake, or for some reason does not take the pill one or several days, or not go to the pharmacy on time to renew the prescription, or the pharmacy might be unwilling to provide enough pills to cover an extended absence.

=== Effectiveness comparison ===
The table below color codes the typical use and perfect use failure rates, where the failure rate is measured as the expected number of pregnancies per year per woman using the method:

Blue	under 1%	lower risk
Green	up to 5%	
Yellow	up to 10%	
Orange	up to 20%	
Red	over 20%	higher risk
Grey	no data	no data available

For example, a failure rate of 20% means that 20 of 100 women become pregnant during the first year of use. Note that the rate may go above 100% if all women, on average, become pregnant within less than a year. In the degenerated case of all women becoming pregnant instantly, the rate would be infinite.

In the user action required column, items that are non-user dependent (require action once per year or less) also have a blue background.

Some methods may be used simultaneously for higher effectiveness rates. For example, using condoms with spermicides the estimated perfect use failure rate would be comparable to the perfect use failure rate of the implant. However, mathematically combining the rates to estimate the effectiveness of combined methods can be inaccurate, as the effectiveness of each method is not necessarily independent.

If a method is known or suspected to have been ineffective, such as a condom breaking, or a method could not be used, as is the case for rape when user action is required for every act of intercourse, emergency contraception (ECP) may be taken 72 to 120 hours after sexual intercourse. Emergency contraception should be taken shortly before or as soon after intercourse as possible, as its efficacy decreases with increasing delay. Although ECP is considered an emergency measure, levonorgestrel ECP taken shortly before sexual intercourse may be used as a primary method for women who have sexual intercourse only a few times a year and want a hormonal method, but do not want to take hormones all the time. The failure rate of repeated or regular use of LNG ECP is similar to the rate for those using a barrier method.

Rate of pregnancy during the first year of use
Birth control method	Brand/common name	Typical-use failure rate (%)	Perfect-use failure rate (%)	Type	Implementation	User action required
Contraceptive implant	Implanon/Nexplanon, Jadelle, the implant	0.05 (1 in 2000)	0.05 (1 in 2000)	Progestogen	Subdermal implant	3-5 years
Vasectomy	Male sterilization	0.15 (1 in 666)	0.1 (1 in 1000)	Sterilization	Surgical procedure	Once
Combined injectable	Lunelle, Cyclofem	0.2 (1 in 500)	0.2 (1 in 500)	Estrogen & progestogen	Injection	Monthly
IUD with progestogen	Mirena, Skyla, Liletta	0.2 (1 in 500)	0.2 (1 in 500)	Intrauterine & progestogen	Intrauterine	3-7 years
Essure (removed from markets)	Female sterilization	0.26 (1 in 384)	0.26 (1 in 384)	Sterilization	Surgical procedure	Once
Tubal ligation	Tube tying, female sterilization	0.5 (1 in 200)	0.5 (1 in 200)	Sterilization	Surgical procedure	Once
Bilateral salpingectomy	Tube removal, "bisalp"	0.75 (1 in 133) after 10 years (Note: No data for 1 year failure rates)	0.75 after 10 years	Sterilization	Surgical procedure	Once
IUD with copper	Paragard, Copper T, the coil	0.8 (1 in 125)	0.6 (1 in 167)	Intrauterine & copper	Intrauterine	3 to 12+ years
Forschungsgruppe NFP symptothermal method, teaching sessions + application	Sensiplan by Arbeitsgruppe NFP (Malteser Germany gGmbh)	1.68 (1 of 60)	0.43 (1 in 233)	Behavioral	Teaching sessions, observation, charting and evaluating a combination of fertility symptoms	Three teaching sessions + daily application
LAM for 6 months only; not applicable if menstruation resumes (Note: The pregnancy rate applies until the user reaches six months postpartum, or until menstruation resumes, whichever comes first. If menstruation occurs earlier than six months postpartum, the method is no longer effective. For users for whom menstruation does not occur within the six months: after six months postpartum, the method becomes less effective.)	Ecological breastfeeding	2 (1 in 50)	0.5 (1 in 200)	Behavioral	Breastfeeding	Every few hours
2002 cervical cap and spermicide used by nulliparous (discontinued in 2008) (Note: In the effectiveness study of Lea's Shield, 84% of participants were parous. The unadjusted pregnancy rate in the six-month study was 8.7% among spermicide users and 12.9% among non-spermicide users. No pregnancies occurred among nulliparous users of the Lea's Shield. Assuming the effectiveness ratio of nulliparous to parous users is the same for the Lea's Shield as for the Prentif cervical cap and the Today contraceptive sponge, the unadjusted six-month pregnancy rate would be 2.2% for spermicide users and 2.9% for those who used the device without spermicide.) (Note: Nulliparous refers to those who have not given birth.)	Lea's Shield	5 (1 in 20)	no data	Barrier & spermicide	Vaginal insertion	Every act of intercourse
MPA shot	Depo Provera, the shot	4 (1 in 25)	0.2 (1 in 500)	Progestogen	Injection	12 weeks
Testosterone injection for male (unapproved, experimental method)	Testosterone Undecanoate	6.1 (1 in 16)	1.1 (1 in 91)	Testosterone	Intramuscular Injection	Every 4 weeks
1999 cervical cap and spermicide (replaced by second generation in 2003)	FemCap	7.6 (estimated) (1 in 13)	no data	Barrier & spermicide	Vaginal insertion	Every act of intercourse
Contraceptive patch	Ortho Evra, the patch	7 (1 in 14)	0.3 (1 in 333)	Estrogen & progestogen	Transdermal patch	Weekly
Combined oral contraceptive pill	The pill	7 (1 in 14)	0.3 (1 in 333)	Estrogen & progestogen + placebo	Oral medication	Daily
Ethinylestradiol/etonogestrel vaginal ring	NuvaRing, the ring	7 (1 in 14)	0.3 (1 in 333)	Estrogen & progestogen	Vaginal insertion	In place 3 weeks / 1 week break
Progestogen only pill	POP, minipill	9 (1 in 11)	0.3 (1 in 333)	Progestogen + placebo	Oral medication	Daily
Ormeloxifene	Saheli, Centron	9 (1 in 11)	2 (1 in 50)	SERM	Oral medication	Weekly
Emergency contraception pill	Plan B One-Step®	no data	no data	Levonorgestrel	Oral medication	Every act of intercourse
Standard Days Method	CycleBeads, iCycleBeads	12 (1 in 8.3)	5 (1 in 20)	Behavioral	Counting days since menstruation	Daily
Diaphragm and spermicide		12 (1 in 6)	6 (1 in 12)	Barrier + spermicide	Vaginal insertion	Every act of intercourse
Plastic contraceptive sponge with spermicide used by nulliparous	Today sponge, the sponge	14 (1 in 7)	9 (1 in 11)	Barrier + spermicide	Vaginal insertion	Every act of intercourse
2002 cervical cap and spermicide used by parous (discontinued in 2008) (Note: Parous refers to those who have given birth.)	Lea's Shield	15 (1 in 6)	no data	Barrier & spermicide	Vaginal insertion	Every act of intercourse
1988 cervical cap and spermicide (discontinued in 2005) used by nulliparous	Prentif	16 (1 in 6.25)	9 (1 in 11)	Barrier & spermicide	Vaginal insertion	Every act of intercourse
External (male) latex condom	Condom	13 (1 in 7)	2 (1 in 50)	Barrier	Placed on erect penis	Every act of intercourse
Internal (female) condom		21 (1 in 4.7)	5 (1 in 20)	Barrier	Vaginal or anal insertion	Every act of intercourse
Coitus interruptus	Withdrawal method, pulling out	20 (1 in 5)	4 (1 in 25)	Behavioral	Withdrawal	Every act of intercourse
Symptoms-based fertility awareness ex. symptothermal and calendar-based methods (Note: No formal studies meet the standards of Contraceptive Technology for determining typical effectiveness. The typical effectiveness listed here is from the CDC's National Survey of Family Growth, which grouped symptoms-based methods together with calendar-based methods. See Fertility awareness#Effectiveness.) (Note: The term fertility awareness is sometimes used interchangeably with the term natural family planning (NFP), though NFP usually refers to use of periodic abstinence in accordance with Catholic beliefs.)	TwoDay method, Billings ovulation method, Creighton Model	24 (1 in 4)	0.40–4 (1 in 25–250)	Behavioral	Observation and charting of basal body temperature, cervical mucus or cervical position	Daily
Calendar-based methods	The rhythm method, Knaus-Ogino method, Standard Days method	no data	5 (1 in 20)	Behavioral	Calendar-based	Daily
Plastic contraceptive sponge with spermicide used by parous	Today sponge, the sponge	27 (1 in 3.7)	20 (1 in 4)	Barrier & spermicide	Vaginal insertion	Every act of intercourse
Spermicidal gel, suppository, or film		21 (1 in 5)	16 (1 in 6.25)	Spermicide	Vaginal insertion	Every act of intercourse
1988 cervical cap and spermicide used by parous (discontinued in 2005)	Prentif	32 (1 in 3)	26 (1 in 4)	Barrier & spermicide	Vaginal insertion	Every act of intercourse
None (unprotected intercourse)		85 (6 in 7)	85 (6 in 7)	Behavioral	Discontinuing birth control	N/A
Birth control method	Brand/common name	Typical-use failure rate (%)	Perfect-use failure rate (%)	Type	Implementation	User action required

== See also ==
- Male contraceptive
