= Condom effectiveness =

At preventing STDs and pregnancy

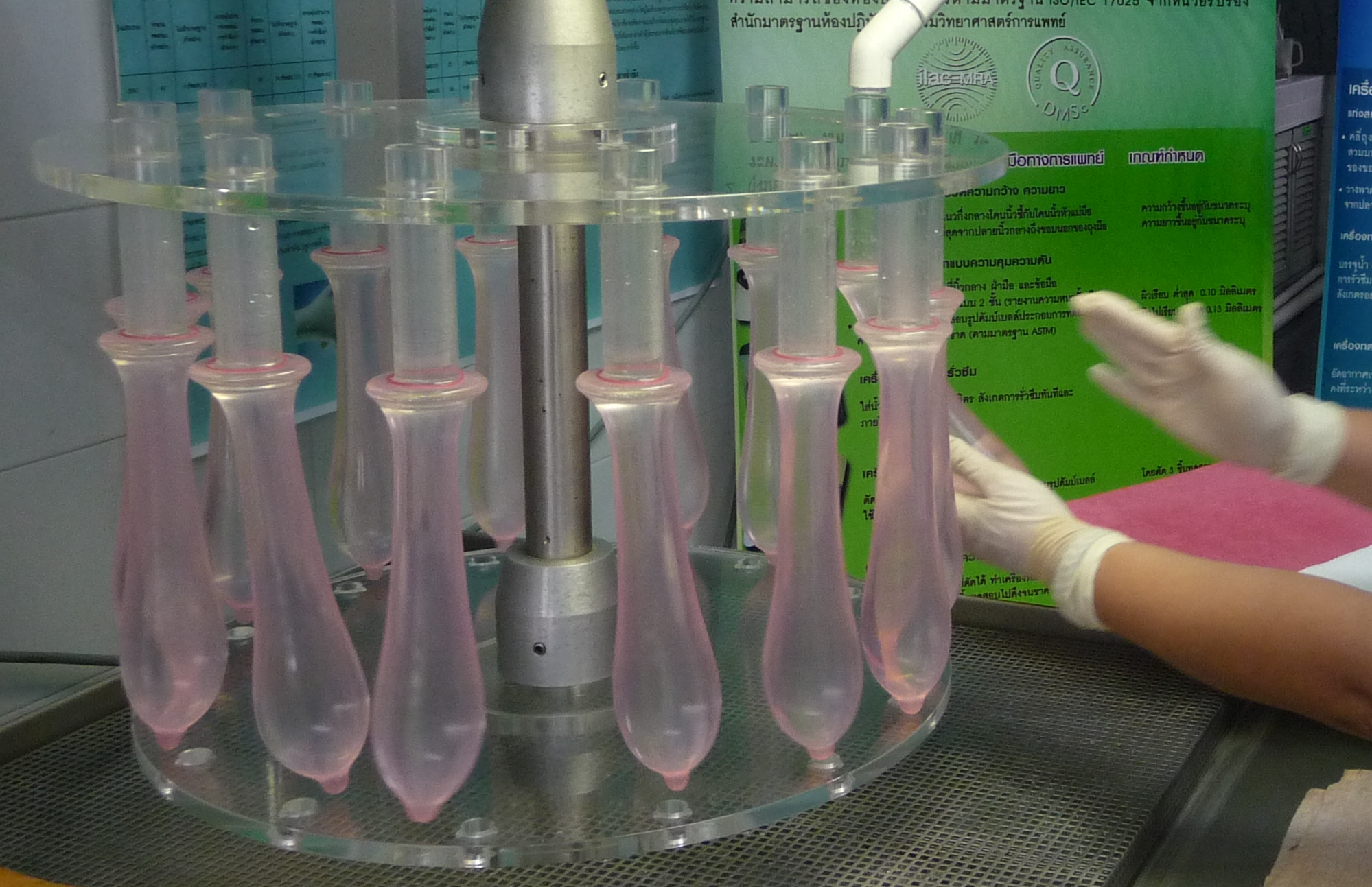
Male condoms being stress tested by adding water, as part of a museum exhibit.

Condom effectiveness is how effective condoms are at preventing STDs and pregnancy. Correctly using male condoms and other barriers like female condoms and dental dams, every time, can reduce (though not eliminate) the risk of sexually transmitted infections (STIs), including human immunodeficiency virus (HIV) and viral hepatitis. They can also provide protection against other diseases that may be transmitted through sex like Zika and Ebola. Using male or female condoms correctly, every time, can also help prevent pregnancy.

Consistent and correct use of male latex condoms can reduce (though not eliminate) the risk of STD transmission and pregnancy. To achieve the maximum protective effect, condoms must be used both consistently and correctly. Inconsistent use can lead to STD acquisition or pregnancy because transmission or conception can occur with a single act of intercourse. Similarly, if condoms are not used correctly, the protective effect may be diminished even when they are used consistently. The most reliable ways to avoid transmission of sexually transmitted diseases (STDs), including human immunodeficiency virus (HIV), are to abstain from sexual activity or to be in a long-term mutually monogamous relationship with an uninfected partner. However, many infected persons may be unaware of their infections because STDs are often asymptomatic or unrecognized.

== Male condom ==
=== Preventing STI ===
Latex condoms, when used consistently and correctly, are highly effective in preventing the sexual transmission of HIV, the virus that causes AIDS. In addition, consistent and correct use of latex condoms reduces the risk of other sexually transmitted diseases (STDs), including diseases transmitted by genital secretions, and to a lesser degree, genital ulcer diseases. Condom use may reduce the risk for genital human papillomavirus (HPV) infection and HPV-associated diseases, e.g., genital warts and cervical cancer. There are two primary ways that STDs are transmitted. Some diseases, such as HIV infection, gonorrhea, chlamydia, and trichomoniasis, are transmitted when infected urethral or vaginal secretions contact mucosal surfaces (such as the male urethra, the vagina, or cervix). In contrast, genital ulcer diseases (such as genital herpes, syphilis, and chancroid) and human papillomavirus (HPV) infection are primarily transmitted through contact with infected skin or mucosal surfaces. Laboratory studies have demonstrated that latex condoms provide an essentially impermeable barrier to particles the size of STD pathogens.

Condoms can be expected to provide different levels of protection for various STDs, depending on differences in how the diseases are transmitted. Condoms block transmission and acquisition of STDs by preventing contact between the condom wearer's penis and a sex partner's skin, mucosa, and genital secretions. A greater level of protection is provided for the diseases transmitted by genital secretions. A lesser degree of protection is provided for genital ulcer diseases or HPV because these infections also may be transmitted by exposure to areas (e.g., infected skin or mucosal surfaces) that are not covered or protected by the condom.

Summary of the relative effectiveness of male condom based on primary mode of transmission
| Mode of transmission | Condom efficacy | Examples of STIs |
|---|---|---|
| Semen to mucous membrane | Highly effective | HIV / AIDS; Hepatitis B; HTLV-1 |
| Mucous membrane to mucous membrane | Limited effectiveness | Chlamydia; Gonorrhoea; Syphilis |
| Skin to skin | Limited effectiveness | Herpes (HSV1, HSV2); Molluscum contagiosum |

Epidemiologic studies seek to measure the protective effect of condoms by comparing risk of STD transmission among condom users with nonusers who are engaging in sexual intercourse. Accurately estimating the effectiveness of condoms for prevention of STDs, however, is methodologically challenging. Well-designed studies address key factors such as the extent to which condom use has been consistent and correct and whether infection identified is incident (i.e. new) or prevalent (i.e. pre-existing). Of particular importance, the study design should assure that the population being evaluated has documented exposure to the STD of interest during the period that condom use is being assessed. Although consistent and correct use of condoms is inherently difficult to measure, because such studies would involve observations of private behaviors, several published studies have demonstrated that failure to measure these factors properly tends to result in underestimation of condom effectiveness. Epidemiologic studies provide useful information regarding the magnitude of STD risk reduction associated with condom use. Extensive literature review confirms that the best epidemiologic studies of condom effectiveness address HIV infection. Numerous studies of discordant couples (where only one partner is infected) have shown consistent use of latex condoms to be highly effective for preventing sexually acquired HIV infection. Similarly, studies have shown that condom use reduces the risk of other STDs. However, the overall strength of the evidence regarding the effectiveness of condoms in reducing the risk of other STDs is not at the level of that for HIV, primarily because fewer methodologically sound and well-designed studies have been completed that address other STDs. Critical reviews of all studies, with both positive and negative findings (referenced here) point to the limitations in study design in some studies which result in underestimation of condom effectiveness; therefore, the true protective effect is likely to be greater than the effect observed.

Overall, the preponderance of available epidemiologic studies have found that when used consistently and correctly, condoms are highly effective in preventing the sexual transmission of HIV infection and reduce the risk of other STDs.

==== Genital ulcer diseases and HPV infection ====
Genital ulcer diseases and HPV infections can occur in both male and female genital areas that are covered or protected by a latex condom, as well as in areas that are not covered. Consistent and correct use of latex condoms reduces the risk of genital herpes, syphilis, and chancroid only when the infected area or site of potential exposure is protected. Condom use may reduce the risk for HPV infection and HPV-associated diseases (e.g., genital warts and cervical cancer).

Genital ulcer diseases include genital herpes, syphilis, and chancroid. These diseases are transmitted primarily through “skin-to-skin” contact from sores/ulcers or infected skin that looks normal. HPV infections are transmitted through contact with infected genital skin or mucosal surfaces/secretions. Genital ulcer diseases and HPV infection can occur in male or female genital areas that are covered (protected by the condom) as well as those areas that are not.

Laboratory studies have demonstrated that latex condoms provide an essentially impermeable barrier to particles the size of STD pathogens.

Protection against genital ulcer diseases and HPV depends on the site of the sore/ulcer or infection. Latex condoms can only protect against transmission when the ulcers or infections are in genital areas that are covered or protected by the condom. Thus, consistent and correct use of latex condoms would be expected to protect against transmission of genital ulcer diseases and HPV in some, but not all, instances.

Epidemiologic studies that compare infection rates among condom users and nonusers provide evidence that latex condoms provide limited protection against syphilis and herpes simplex virus-2 transmission. No conclusive studies have specifically addressed the transmission of chancroid and condom use, although several studies have documented a reduced risk of genital ulcers associated with increased condom use in settings where chancroid is a leading cause of genital ulcers.

Condom use may reduce the risk for HPV-associated diseases (e.g., genital warts and cervical cancer) and may mitigate the other adverse consequences of infection with HPV; condom use has been associated with higher rates of regression of cervical intraepithelial neoplasia (CIN) and clearance of HPV infection in women, and with regression of HPV-associated penile lesions in men. A limited number of prospective studies have demonstrated a protective effect of condoms on the acquisition of genital HPV.

While condom use has been associated with a lower risk of cervical cancer, the use of condoms should not be a substitute for routine screening to detect and prevent cervical cancer, nor should it be a substitute for HPV vaccination among those eligible for the vaccine.

==== Preventing HIV ====
Latex condoms, when used consistently and correctly, are highly effective in preventing the sexual transmission of HIV, the virus that causes AIDS. HIV infection is, by far, the most deadly STD, and considerably more scientific evidence exists regarding condom effectiveness for prevention of HIV infection than for other STDs. The body of research on the effectiveness of latex condoms in preventing sexual transmission of HIV is both comprehensive and conclusive. The ability of latex condoms to prevent transmission of HIV has been scientifically established in “real-life” studies of sexually active couples as well as in laboratory studies.

Laboratory studies have demonstrated that latex condoms provide an essentially impermeable barrier to particles the size of HIV.

Latex condoms cover the penis and provide an effective barrier to exposure to secretions such as urethral and vaginal secretions, blocking the pathway of sexual transmission of HIV infection.

Epidemiologic studies that are conducted in real-life settings, where one partner is infected with HIV and the other partner is not, demonstrate that the consistent use of latex condoms provides a high degree of protection.

=== Preventing pregnancy ===
The effectiveness of condoms at preventing pregnancy can be assessed two ways. Perfect use or method effectiveness rates only include people who use condoms properly and consistently. Actual use, or typical use effectiveness rates are of all condom users, including those who use condoms incorrectly or do not use condoms at every act of intercourse. Rates are generally presented for the first year of use. Most commonly the Pearl Index is used to calculate effectiveness rates, but some studies use decrement tables.

The typical use pregnancy rate among condom users varies depending on the population being studied, ranging from 10 to 18% per year. The perfect use pregnancy rate of condoms is 2% per year. Condoms may be combined with other forms of contraception (such as spermicide) for greater protection.

== See also ==
- Comparison of birth control methods#Effectiveness calculation
