= Womb veil =

Archaic type of contraceptive

Edward Bliss Foote designed an early form of barrier contraception that he called the "womb veil"

The womb veil was a 19th-century American form of barrier contraception consisting of an occlusive pessary, i.e. a device inserted into the vagina to block access of the sperm into the uterus. Made of rubber, it was a forerunner to the modern diaphragm and cervical cap. The name was first used by Edward Bliss Foote in 1863 for the device he designed and marketed. "Womb veil" became the most common 19th-century American term for similar devices, and continued to be used into the early 20th century.

Womb veils were among a "range of contraceptive technology of questionable efficacy" available to American women of the 19th century, forms of which began to be advertised in the 1830s and 1840s. They could be bought widely through mail-order catalogues; when induced abortion was criminalized during the 1870s, reliance on birth control increased. Womb veils were touted as a discreet form of contraception, with one catalogue of erotic products from the 1860s promising that they could be "used by the female without danger of detection by the male."

The use of rubber pessaries for contraception likely arose from the 19th-century practice of correcting a prolapsed uterus with such a device; the condition seems to have been far more frequently diagnosed than its incidence would warrant, and at times may have been a fiction for employing a pessary for birth control. As with the production of condoms for men, the development of vulcanized rubber by Charles Goodyear helped make barrier contraceptives for women more reliable and inexpensive.

Other terms for the contraceptive diaphragm were "female preventatives", "female protectors", "Victoria's protectors", and the "French pessary" ("F.P.") or pessaire preventif. This linguistic variety, some of it euphemistic, makes it difficult to distinguish in the literature among diaphragms, cervical caps, female condoms, and other pessaries; one form of "womb veil" is described in 1890 as "like a ring pessary covered by a membraneous envelope." Another source in 1895 describes it as "a small soft rubber cup surrounded at the brim by a flexible rubber ring about an inch or inch and a quarter in diameter."

== Social history ==
The Popular Health Movement of the Jacksonian era encouraged the sharing of knowledge about contraception, and contraceptive devices were advertised openly in newspaper ads and in brochures throughout the first half of the 19th century. Among their proponents was the physician Edward Bliss Foote. Foote introduced his device, the womb veil, in a self-published book entitled Medical Common Sense:

This consists of an India-rubber contrivance which the female easily adjusts in the vagina before copulation, and which spreads a thin tissue of rubber before the mouth of the womb so as to prevent the seminal aura from entering. … Conception cannot possibly take place when it is used. The full enjoyment of the conjugal embrace can be indulged in during coition. The husband would hardly be likely to know that it was being used, unless told by the wife. … It places conception entirely under the control of the wife, to whom it naturally belongs; for it is for her to say at what time and under what circumstances, she will become the mother, and the moral, religious, and physical instructress of offspring.

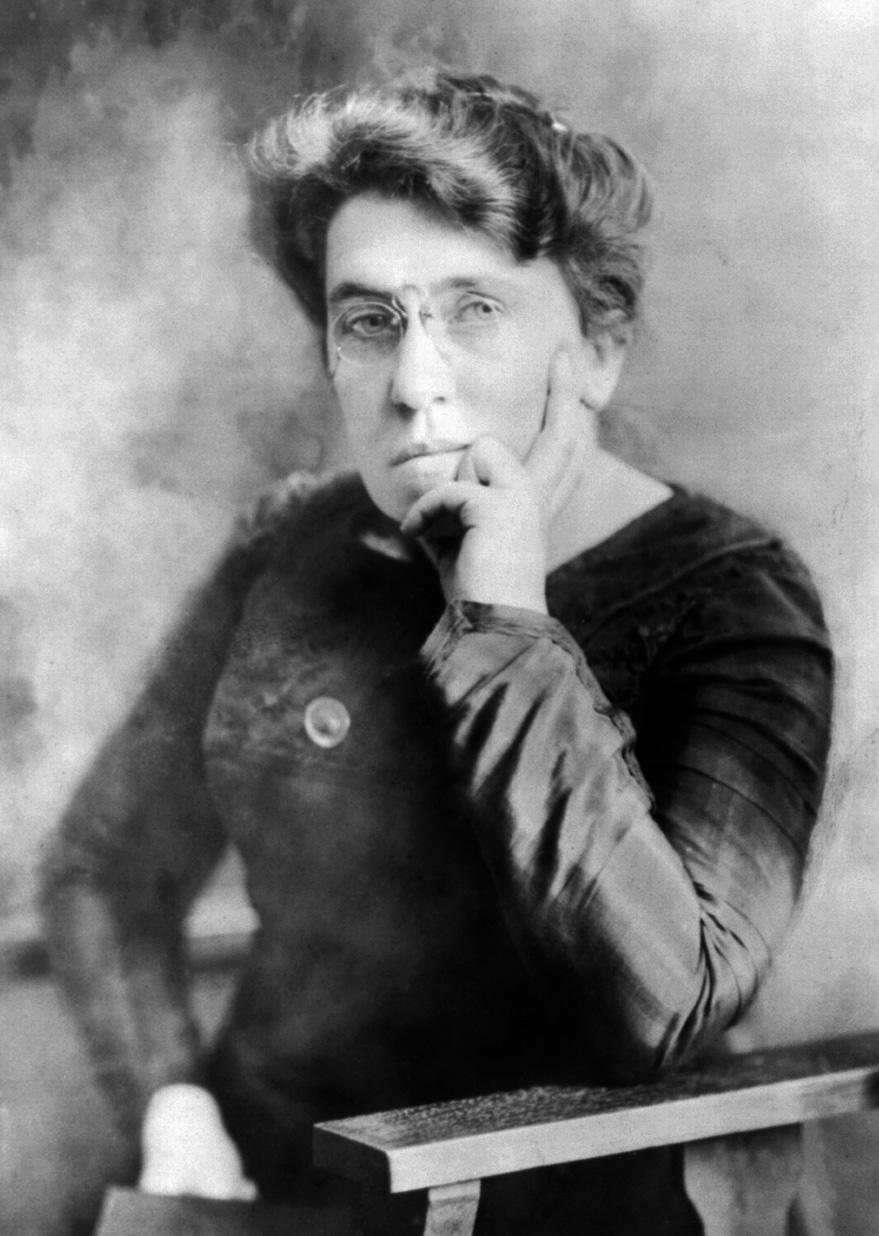
Emma Goldman was among those who promoted the use of "womb veils" as contraception

Foote appears to have been the first to use the term "womb veil", in introducing his vaginal diaphragm in 1863. The explicitness of his description is regarded as "rather remarkable" for its time. Foote touted his device as "the only reliable means yet discovered for the prevention of conception," and sold it "closely sealed" through the mail at a cost of $6. Foote may have gotten the idea for his device from an 1838 German treatise on cervical caps, or from acquaintance with the German tradition of midwifery that had been brought to the United States. Although he mentions his intention to obtain a patent, none is recorded.

"Succinct, straightforward" advertising for birth control devices, as well as for aphrodisiacs and drugs to induce abortion and cure venereal disease, had been common in newspapers of the 1830s and 40s. But in 1873, the Comstock laws made it illegal to disseminate information about contraception. The following year, Foote was arrested and convicted under Comstock. His pamphlets were seized and destroyed, although his descriptions of the womb veil survive in early editions of his book.

In subsequent editions, he was required to cut back the section on contraception to focus on douching, usually referred to in the literature of the time as the use of syringes. Retailers were subjected to raids, with womb veils among the contraceptive devices confiscated. Although contraceptive information in popular media was curtailed, technical and medical journals and textbooks were not subject to this regulation, and physicians continued to discuss both issues and technologies pertaining to birth control.

The early 20th century saw a resurgence of interest in birth control in the United States, due largely to the efforts of Margaret Sanger, Fania Mindell and other social activists. One of the most outspoken advocates for contraception during this time was Emma Goldman, who openly defied the Comstock laws by recommending the womb veil in leaflets she distributed after her lectures.

== Efficacy and side effects ==
The womb veil, described in medical Latin as a type of pessarium occlusivum, was considered by some medical authorities to be effective if fitted and inserted correctly. Post-coital douching was often recommended in conjunction with its use. Prolonged use of the device was reported on occasion to produce side effects, some of which pointed toward a need for better hygiene. Serious ulcerations were reported among those who wore it too long or without proper care. In a report to the New Haven Medical Association, one doctor blamed the womb veil for a woman's nocturnal seizures.

A gynecologist noted that the rubber womb veil might cause irritation or itching, but reckoned that the "opportunity for increased or unlimited intercourse" was the proximate cause. Another physician who promoted contraception as a way to avoid resorting to abortion found that some users had been disappointed in the womb veil; he recommended douching as a more effective means.

One physician found the womb veil to be "harmless" and likely "effectual" in some cases, but thought it relied too much on women knowing how to insert it correctly, with the possibility that it might become dislodged during intercourse. Concerns about displacement of the womb veil, as well as irritation and loss of pleasurable sensation, were also expressed by the author of a 1912 book on human sexuality. The element of unreliability was recognized in the literature distributed by Emma Goldman.

Concerns about fit were addressed by offering over-the-counter womb veils labeled by size, though not in a standardized way: "big" and "small," "one-size-fits-all," and "mothers' size" were some of the terms used. Symptoms such as cramping, abdominal pain, ulceration, and urinary tract infections were likely to have been caused by a too-large womb veil. The risk of displacement and consequent pregnancy was increased by a veil too small. By comparison, modern diaphragms require cervical measurement and a prescription from a medical practitioner, and range in size from 50 to 95 millimeters.

Noting that "any preventive will fail if not applied properly," the New York physician and free-love advocate Oscar Rotter offered these instructions:

For introduction, the woman is to sit down, so to say, on her heels, with her legs spread apart, which will bring the womb down as low as possible. Then taking the womb veil into the right hand with the cavity looking upward and compressed from side to side, giving it thus the shape of an ellipse, she has to push it up the vagina as far as it will go. It will then spread out of its own accord and apply itself closely and firmly to the neck of the womb.

Rotter also recommended that the veil be used in conjunction with a spermicide ointment made from muriate of quinine and vaseline. Instructions for removal and hygiene followed.

Rotter was an enthusiastic if careful proponent of the womb veil. Writing in 1897, he recommended pessaries made in England as of the highest quality, with those from Germany also satisfactory.

The American in his view were the most poorly made, an inferiority he blamed on the restrictive Comstock laws that drove manufacture and sale underground: "In England, however, where such goods are openly advertised and sold, competition tends to secure the survival of the fittest, and hence it is better to import them from that country." Until legal prohibitions limiting commercial production and distribution were lessened in the 1920s, reputable companies would manufacture devices for contraception only as a discreet sideline. Small-scale entrepreneurs, not excluding black marketeers, stepped in to produce womb veils among other taboo items intended if not explicitly labeled as birth control. For women too poor to buy quality contraception, Rotter also described how to make a homemade device from a rubber ball.

== Moral and racialist aspects ==
The Comstock ban on advertising contraceptive devices, which included womb veils, was not intended to protect consumers from false claims of efficacy, but from exposure to indecency. One editorial writer specifically asserted that even if the ads made true statements, the "anger and indignation of respectable people" at finding such products in their daily newspaper would be grounds to ban them. At Foote's trial, Anthony Comstock himself testified that the womb veil was "an instrument of death both moral and physical to the youth of the land."

The use of womb veils, like other forms of contraception, was thus subject to moral condemnation. In his Ladies' Guide in Health and Disease, John Harvey Kellogg asserted several legitimate reasons for family planning, but considered womb veils and other technological forms of birth control to be harmful both physically and psychologically, causing women to lose "all respect for the sacredness of the maternal function." The author of a Hand-book to Obstetrics (1908) opined:

I think there is a growing distaste for the family duties among women … that should be condemned. The efforts of women to equal man in studies, work, etc., while still claiming their sex privileges, with the dissolution of club and society life, are leading to a 'race suicide.' This ought not to be. Woman is anatomically, physiologically, and emotionally evolved for one sole and single purpose, any departure therefrom being done at the violation of her best ideals and a misdirection of energy.

The author finds the rhythm method ineffective, since "for the female, rut and menstruation are the same." He further disapproves of withdrawal, warning that the latter would lead to "nervous collapse" and noting that "it is infinitely worse than masturbation."

The perceived immorality of contraceptive devices was linked to the fear that they might enhance sexual pleasure; like masturbation, the use of womb veils, condoms, and other appliances might "heighten the feeling," but "there is no contact of the parts, and it is morally pernicious and degrading." Because these devices removed the fear of conception, they were said to foster a "positive invitation to illicit intercourse." Although in general douching was more acceptable, even ads for "syringes" could be condemned as being "as hurtful to public morals and children's education as if they advertised condoms and womb veils."

Although birth control was sometimes advocated as a way for the poor to manage their resources better by limiting the size of their family, it could also be promoted for controlling social groups seen as inferior. Observing that a couple "swept away by passion" might not think to take precautions such as inserting a womb veil, and that "the least intelligent" such as "the rough workman or dull peasant" would be most likely not to exercise self-control, one medical writer advocated intrauterine devices that could be left in place "if we wish to breed up not down."

Anxieties about "race suicide" also framed opposition to birth control. The average number of births among white married couples is estimated to have dropped by nearly half between 1800 and 1900. Womb veils were pointed to in racially charged rhetoric warning that contraception threatened the white, specifically Anglo-Saxon, fertility rate. A Missouri physician blamed gynecology as a medical specialty for teaching "young ladies how to avoid conception," claiming that "syringes, sponges, and womb-veils will exterminate the descendants of the Mayflower." An editorial in a 1906 issue of Texas Medical Journal asserted that if all physicians were "both civic and Christian gentlemen"

we should have no criminal abortion cases, no womb veils, no tubes with buttons to close the os, and the Anglo-Saxon race, instead of being in a decadent condition, would rise in its birth rate and not leave the race problem to the Latin-Teutonic and colored race.

In fact, indications are that black Americans also practiced family planning to a comparable degree in the post-slavery period, and several factors seem to have influenced a desire for smaller families among various demographic groups in the 19th century.

== See also ==
- History of condoms
- Timeline of reproductive rights legislation
- Sexuality of Abraham Lincoln, section on Mary Todd Lincoln
- Birth control movement in the United States
