= Medical Common Sense =

Medical Common Sense: Applied to the Causes, Prevention and Cure of Chronic Diseases and Unhappiness in Marriage was an 1858 work authored and published by Edward Bliss Foote. The work sold well and an expanded version, Plain Home Talk, Embracing Medical Common Sense, sold 500,000 copies. This expanded version would include over 500 pages of new content and whereas the initial work was written in two parts, Plain Home Talk contained four parts and put a large emphasis on marriage and sexual health and ethics topics.

== Synopsis ==
In the book Foote discusses various issues that he believed could have a detrimental effect on marriage. Birth control is discussed in common language to make the book more easily accessible to the general public. According to scholar David M. Rabban, Foote's work "dealt extensively and explicitly with social as well as physiological aspects of sex and laid the groundwork for the birth control movement of the twentieth century." Foote recommends four different devices for birth control, which he says he invented: a fish bladder condom, a rubber cap for the tip of the penis, a rubber diaphragm called a womb veil, and an "electro-magnetic preventive machine" to alter the "electrical conditions" of sex. Only the first three would have been effective. Foote says that these devices would not reduce sexual pleasure, even noting that the ring on the penis cap "is said to greatly heighten the pleasure of the act on the part of the female."

Aside from birth control, Foote argued that children should not have lengthy exposures to elderly people, as he believed that they could "sap the strength and vitality from children by sheer proximity."

The expanded version, Plain Home Talk, Embracing Medical Common Sense, contained four parts:

- "Part I. Disease-its causes, prevention and cure"
- "Part II. Chronic diseases - their causes and successful treatment"
- "Part III. Plain talk about the sexual organs; the natural relations of the sexes; civilization, society and marriage"
- "Part IV. Suggestions for the improvement of popular marriage, etc."

== Reception ==
Foote's book and its expanded version both sold well, but some of its content on contraception was considered to be obscene under the Comstock Act. Foote was arrested in 1874 and in 1876 he was convicted, fined, and forced to remove content about birth control from Medical Common Sense, a move that caused him to vociferously protest against the Act. Anthony Comstock later claimed that Foote had been brought to trial for advertisements rather than for the book itself and that these advertisements were "an incentive to crime against young girls and women". Following the arrest Foote published testimonials from people who wrote him praising the work. He also used proceeds from the sales from the book to fund the National Defense Association and Foote's son Edwin Bond Foote helped found the Free Speech League years later.

== External sources ==
- Foote, Edward Bliss (1868). Medical Common Sense: Applied to the Causes, Prevention and Cure of Chronic Diseases and Unhappiness in Marriage. Pub. by the author.
- "Sexpectations: single white females". Monash University Library. Archived from the original on 2009-04-30.
