= Cervical cap =

Form of barrier contraception

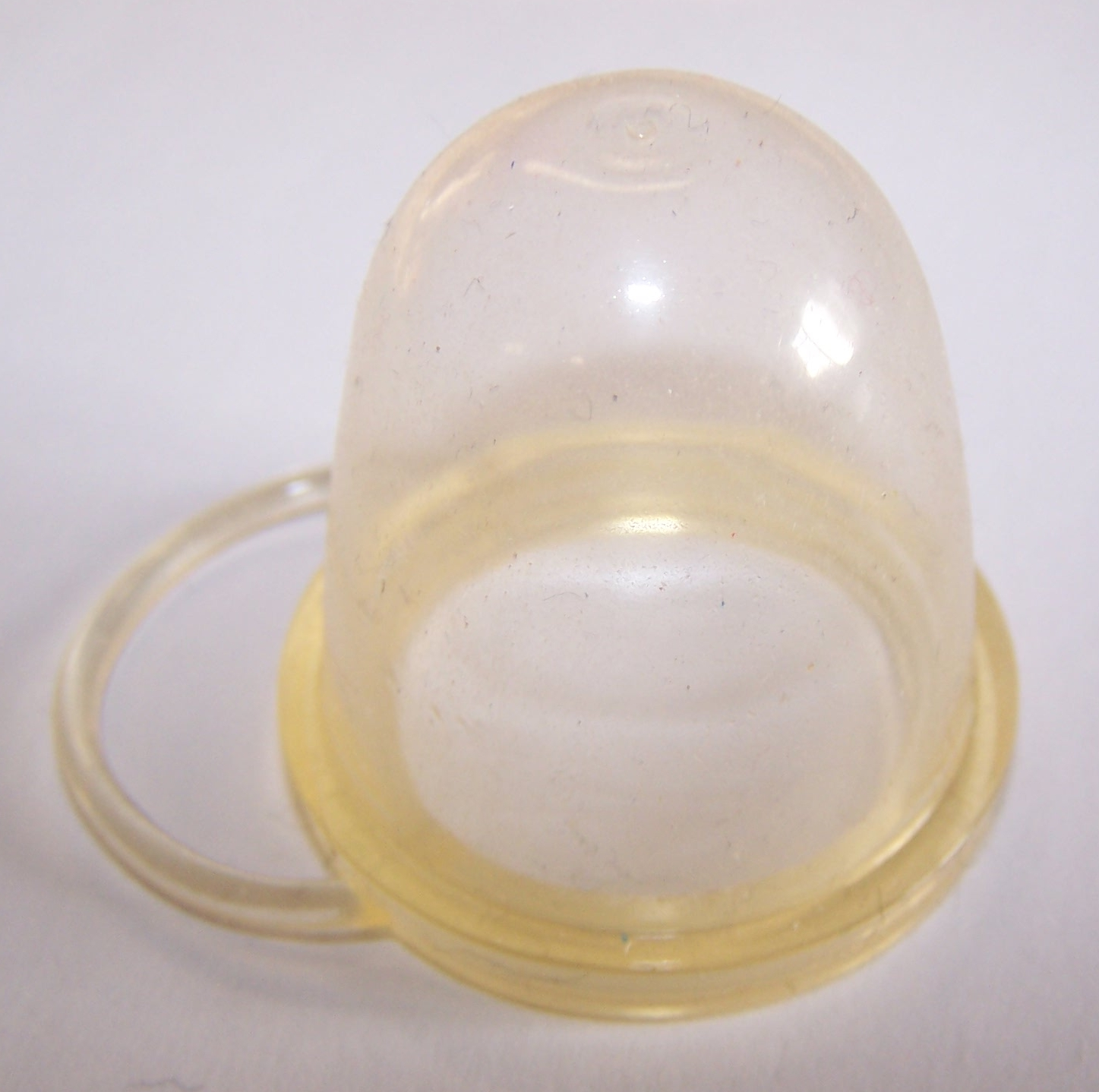
- Oves brand cervical cap (discontinued)

Background
- Type: Barrier
- First use: 1838

Pregnancy rates (first year)
- Perfect use: Prentif, nulliparous: 9% Prentif, parous: 26%
- Typical use: Prentif, nulliparous: 16% Prentif, parous: 32% Lea's Shield: 15%

Usage
- Reversibility: Immediate
- User reminders: Inserted with spermicide and left in place for 6 hours after intercourse
- Clinic review: For fitting and subsequent replacements

Advantages and disadvantages
- Benefits: Femcap may be left in place for 48 hours

The cervical cap is a form of barrier contraception. A cervical cap fits over the cervix and blocks sperm from entering the uterus through the external orifice of the uterus, called the os.

== Terminology ==
The term cervical cap has been used to refer to a number of barrier contraceptives, including the Prentif, Dumas, Vimule, and Oves devices. In the United States, Prentif was the only brand available for several decades (Prentif was withdrawn from the U.S. market in 2005). During this time, it was common to use the term cervical cap to refer exclusively to the Prentif brand.

The Lea's Shield was a cervical barrier device which was discontinued as of 2008. Some sources use cervical cap to refer to the FemCap and Lea's Shield. Other sources include FemCap in the term cervical cap, but classified the Lea's Shield as a distinct device.

In the 1920s, cervical caps (and also diaphragms) were often just called pessaries.

Cervical caps or conception caps have also been designed as a form of assisted reproductive technology, used to help people experiencing infertility.

== Medical use ==
The effectiveness of cervical caps, as with most other forms of contraception, can be assessed two ways: method effectiveness and actual effectiveness. The method effectiveness is the proportion of couples correctly and consistently using the method who do not become pregnant. Actual effectiveness is the proportion of couples who intended that method as their sole form of birth control and do not become pregnant; it includes couples who sometimes use the method incorrectly, or sometimes not at all. Rates are generally presented for the first year of use. Most commonly the Pearl Index is used to calculate effectiveness rates, but some studies use decrement tables.

Contraceptive Technology reports that the method failure rate of the Prentif cervical cap with spermicide is 9% per year for nulliparous women (women who have never given birth), and 26% per year for parous women (who have given birth). The actual pregnancy rates among Prentif users vary depending on the population being studied, with yearly rates of 11% to 32% being reported. An FDA-mandated study reported failure rates: Method rate 6.4% (vs. 4.6% for the diaphragm); Overall rate 17.4% (vs. 16.7% for the diaphragm).

Little data is available on the effectiveness of the Oves cap and FemCap. The Oves manufacturer cites one small study of 17 users. The FemCap website does not cite any data on the current version of the FemCap, but lists data for an older version which is no longer approved by the FDA.

The effectiveness trial of Lea's Shield was too small to determine method effectiveness. The actual pregnancy rate was 15% per year. Of the women in the trial, 85% were parous (had given birth). The study authors estimate that for nulliparous women (those who have never given birth) the pregnancy rate in typical use may be lower, around 5% per year.

=== Compared to other barrier methods ===
In the 1920s, Marie Stopes considered the cervical cap to be the best method of contraception available. Among barrier methods it provides the least intervention of a barrier surface between the penis and vagina resulting in natural contact between them. Except for the Fem-Cap, it also leaves exposed all the vaginal wall so that the hormones, etc. in the seminal fluid of the man can be better absorbed by the woman. The condom does not allow any absorption and the diaphragm exposes less area. However the condom does significantly reduce the likelihood of transmission of STDs. The diaphragm is inserted painlessly. It does not stretch the vagina, nor does it interfere with internal muscle movements during sex, as it is too high up in the vagina. The tip of the penis might touch the cap depending on the position and the size of the penis. Note that what Stopes calls the "Dutch cap" is today known as the "diaphragm". A partial objection to this claim is that most women do not know how to voluntarily control these muscles, and that some size diaphragms do not stretch the vagina that much, especially if they are smaller in size The cervical cap can be worn for a significantly longer period of time than the diaphragm. It can be inserted several hours before intercourse and used successfully even if a woman's partner is drunk, etc. Stopes concludes in favor of the cervical cap and "condemns" the diaphragm "for general use".

== Side effects ==
=== Insertion and removal ===
There are more complaints about difficulties in removal than difficulties with insertion. Since suction holds the cap on, it may sometimes be difficult to remove unless one knows the tricks of removal. Marie Stopes wrote that for rim caps, one should work the tip of one's finger under the rim and pull with a jerk. The idea is to release suction before pulling hard. If one's fingers are too short (and/or the vagina too long), one can use an inserter (intended for diaphragms) or have one's partner do it.

=== Odor ===
Since the cervical cap can be worn for longer periods of time than the diaphragm, it is more prone to develop odors which might begin to appear after three continuous days of wear.

== Types ==
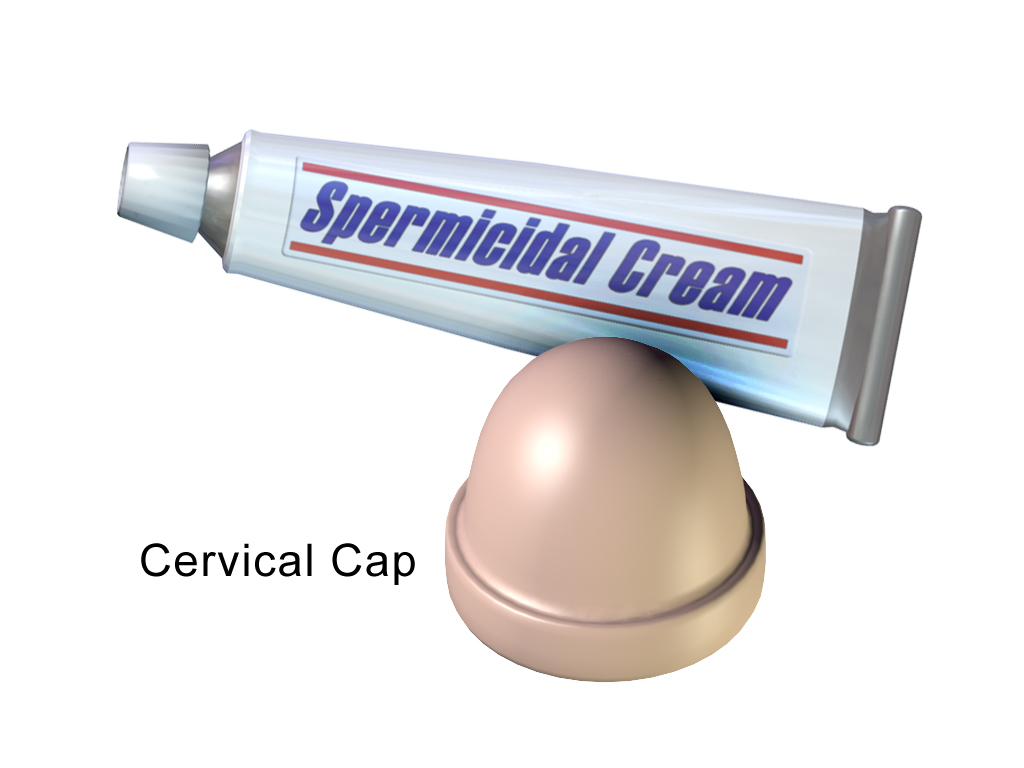
Cervical Cap

Several brands of caps were manufactured during the late 20th and early 21st centuries. They can be divided into two types: cavity rim caps, and other caps. Cavity rim caps adhere to the cervix, while other caps adhere to the vaginal walls around the cervix. However, the FemCap (the only cervical cap sold in the United States after 2008) adheres to both.

The cavity rim caps are Prentif, made of latex, and the disposable cap Oves, made of silicone. There are four sizes of Prentif: 22, 25, 28, and 31 mm. There are three sizes of Oves: 26, 28, and 30 mm. Unique among cervical caps, it adheres to the cervix by surface tension, rather than by suction.

The other devices are the latex Dumas and Vimule, and the silicone FemCap, Lea's Shield, and Shanghai Lily. There are five sizes of Dumas: 50, 55, 60, 65, and 75 mm. There are three sizes of Vimule: 42, 48, and 52 mm. There are three sizes of FemCap: 22, 26, and 30 mm. There are four sizes of Shanghai Lily: 54, 58, 62, and 66 mm. Lea's Shield is manufactured in a single size. Unlike the other caps, Lea's Shield has a one-way air valve that helps it seal to the vaginal walls. The valve also allows the passage of cervical mucus. FemCap does not have such a valve and as such can be used to collect cervical mucus to support the Billings method. Both Lea's Shield and FemCap have loops to assist in removal.

Shanghai Lily is only available in China. As of 2008, many of the other devices are no longer being manufactured: Prentif, Vimule, and Dumas have been discontinued. Oves is only being sold as a conception cap, not as a birth control device. As of February 2009, FemCap was the only brand of cervical cap available in the United States. FemCap is also available in the UK via the NHS on prescription and is often distributed free from Family Planning Clinics depending on the health authority. Lea's Shield is only available as the German brand LEA contraceptivum.

=== FemCap ===
As of 2009, FemCap is the only brand available in the United States. A new FemCap performed poorly in a user acceptability study, suggesting that the modifications increased coital pain or discomfort among female users and their male sex partners, and that the modifications did not improve ease of use overall. However, FemCap users are still less likely to report such pain or discomfort than diaphragm users.

=== Sponge-covered cap ===
A cap of the 1920s had a sponge permanently attached to the outer surface of the cap to hold a liquid spermaticide such as vinegar. It was not as easy to clean the cap when removed, due to the sponge part.

=== 2-part cap ===
This cap of the 1920s (the "Mizpah") had a separate ring (rim) which went around the base of the cervix and was worn constantly. The cap portion (which has its own ring/rim) is snapped into the base ring for use. A criticism of it was that due to the groove in the base ring (so it could attach itself to the cap part) it could not be kept perfectly clean without removing it.

== Design ==
=== Height of dome ===
The dome of a cervical cap may be low with little air space between the dome and the cervix, or high with plenty of air space above the cervix enclosed under the dome. Stopes recommends the high dome type for the following reasons: 1. The high dome cap has room to store secretions from the uterus such as menstrual flow or flow possibly resulting from an orgasm. 2. The high dome cap is allegedly less likely to become dislodged should the penis push hard against the cervix.

=== Rim ===
Per Stopes (in the 1920s) they should be made of very pliable soft rubber which should not be wrinkled or withered.

Caps of the 1920s had three types of rims: solid rubber (like an o-ring), air-inflated rubber, or a spring encased in rubber. Stopes recommended the all-rubber cap with the solid rubber rim There is also the question as to what is the best shape of the rim cross-section so that the penis is less likely to dislodge the cap by contact with the rim. Some caps such as the Prorace, advocated by Stopes, had a wide but flat thin rim so that a penis contact would tend to push the rim against the fornix which it is already resting against.

=== Stopes recommendations ===
The type of rim cap recommended by Stopes in the 1920s with a high dome of thin rubber was experimentally revived by Lamberts in England in 1981 and called the "test cap". It came in six sizes and its light weight meant that it was not as apt to be felt during sexual activity. It was not received well. Some thought it was too flimsy and more likely to dislodge, but Stopes had (in the 1920s) claimed just the opposite for this design, as did the director of a woman's health center who tried it out.

== Process ==
=== Fitting ===
Position of a cavity rim cap. The actual size of the cap and cervix is significantly larger than shown.

Individuals who wish to use a cervical cap are screened by a health care provider to determine if a cervical cap, or one brand of cap, is appropriate for them. If a cap is determined to be appropriate, the provider will determine the proper size. The user must be refitted after any duration of pregnancy, whether the pregnancy is aborted, miscarried, or carried to term through vaginal childbirth or caesarean section.

Several factors may make a cap inappropriate for a particular woman. Women who have given birth may have scar tissue or irregularly shaped cervixes that interfere with the cap forming a good seal. For some women, available sizes of cervical caps do not provide a correct fit. Also, cavity rim caps are not recommended for women with an anteflexed uterus. In infrequent cases a woman may have a long vagina but short fingers and thus may not be able to place the cap correctly. Overall, 80% to 85% of women who want caps can be fitted without issues.

The rim cap should be such that the rim tucks into the fornix snugly and evenly so as to maintain good suction to hold it in place.

In some countries, some devices (such as the Lea's Shield) are available without a prescription.

=== Method of use ===
The first step in inserting or removing a cervical cap is hand washing, to avoid introducing harmful bacteria into the vaginal canal. The cap is inserted prior to sexual intercourse; some sources state that insertion prior to sexual arousal decreases the risk of incorrect placement. Most sources recommend the use of spermicide with the cap, but some sources say spermicide use is optional.

The cap remains in the vagina for a minimum of 6 to 8 hours after the last intravaginal ejaculation. It is recommended the cap be removed within 72 hours (within 48 hours is recommended in the U.S.). Other than the disposable Oves cap, cervical caps can be washed and stored for reuse. Silicone devices may be boiled to sterilize them. Reusable caps may last for one or two years.

Some caps have a pull tab for removal, but it is claimed that pulling on it should not be done, since it the cap tends to adhere very tightly to the cervix. Instead, putting a finger under the rim and pulling with a jerk should easily detach it.

== Acceptability ==
It was reported in the 1980s (during the cervical cap renaissance in the U.S.) that "women overwhelmingly preferred the cap to the diaphragm". On average, women also reported an increase in libido and frequency of sex.

The Oves cap and the new version of the FemCap performed poorly in user acceptability studies. The study on the FemCap concluded that the modifications to the FemCap significantly increased pain and discomfort among female users and their male sex partners, and that the modifications decreased acceptability of the device compared with the earlier version. The study of the Oves cap reported that few women indicated that they would use the cap in the future.

A pilot study conducted in Britain prior to the Lea's Shield's approval concluded that the Lea's Shield "may be acceptable to a highly select minority of women".

As of 2002, the cervical cap was one of the least common methods of contraception in the United States. A 2002 study indicated that of sexually active American women, 0.6% are currently using either the cervical cap, contraceptive sponge, or female condom as their primary method of contraception, and fewer than 1% have ever used a cervical cap.

== History ==
=== Ancient ===
The idea of blocking the cervix to prevent pregnancy is thousands of years old. Various cultures have used cervix-shaped devices such as oiled paper cones or lemon halves. Others made sticky mixtures that included honey or cedar rosin, to be applied to the os. The modern idea of a cervical cap as a fitted device that seals itself against the vaginal walls is of more recent origin; it emerged within the past century.

=== 19th century ===
In 1838, German gynecologist Friedrich Wilde created the first modern cervical cap by making custom-made rubber molds of the cervix for some of his patients. These caps were probably short-lived, as uncured rubber degrades fairly quickly. An important precursor to the invention of more lasting caps was the rubber vulcanization process, patented by Charles Goodyear in 1844. In the 1840s or 1860s E.B. Foote, a U.S. physician claims to have invented the cervical cap but it's reported that his patent was denied since the device could be used for obscene purposes. Foote claimed that his invention was "widely counterfeited". An occlusive pessary marketed in the United States as the "womb veil" seems to have been an early form of diaphragm or cervical cap.

Over the next several decades, the cervical cap became the most widely used barrier contraceptive method in Western Europe and Britain. Although the diaphragm was always more popular in the United States than the cervical cap, the cap was also common.

=== 20th century ===
Many designs were developed in the later 19th and early 20th century in various countries. The Vimule cap became available as early as 1927. A book by Vimule and Co., published in 1898, advertises the Vimule Cap. The Prentif brand cap was introduced in the early 1930s. The Dumas cap was initially made of plastic, and was available by the 1940s. Lamberts (Dalston) Ltd. of the UK manufactured these three cap types. Other types of caps had stems to hold them in place in the cervix; some of the stems actually extended into the uterus. These stem pessaries became precursors to the modern intrauterine device (IUD).

Margaret Sanger brought cervical caps to the U.S. in the 1910s, but later on seemingly preferred the diaphragm, and never repudiated the cap. This may have been influenced by her visit to the Netherlands where the diaphragm (also known as the "Dutch Cap") reigned supreme.

Use of all barrier methods, but especially cervical barriers, dropped dramatically after the 1960s introduction of the combined oral contraceptive pill and the IUD. In 1976, the U.S. government enacted the Medical Device Regulation Act. This law required all manufacturers of medical devices to provide the United States Food and Drug Administration (FDA) with data on the safety and efficacy of those devices. Lamberts (Dalston) Ltd., the only manufacturer at that time, failed to provide this information, and the FDA banned the use of cervical caps in the United States.

In the late 1970s, the FDA reclassified the cervical cap as an investigational device, and it regained limited availability. Within a few years, the FDA withdrew investigational status from the Vimule cap, following a study that associated its use with vaginal lacerations. In 1988, the then 60-year-old Prentif cap gained FDA approval. The feminist movement played a large role in re-introducing the cervical cap to the United States. One paper called its involvement at all steps of the FDA approval process "unprecedented". This renewed interest in the cervical cap has been called "The cervical cap renaissance".

=== Quality ===
In the 1920s it was reported from England that "careless and hasty construction" could sometimes be found in many brands. Some caps had a seam in the dome (two parts of it were welded together making a seam) and the seam might be defective and even contain minute perforations. Also, the junction between the rim and the dome might be rough and difficult to clean. Caps that were seamless avoided the "seam" problem. It was suggested that caps should be inspected for possible defects by the user under a magnifying glass.

== In popular culture ==
A cervical cap is very likely the contraceptive that maid Anna Bates buys for her mistress Lady Mary Crawley in the second episode of the fifth series of the period drama Downton Abbey. Mary Crawley is inspired by the book Married Love, from Marie Stopes.

== Bibliography ==
- Chalker, Rebecca (1988). "Recent experience with the cervical cap in the United States". In Runnebaum; et al. (eds.). Female Contraception, Update and Trends. Springer-Verlag. pp. 280–285.
- Chalker, Rebecca (1987). The complete cervical cap guide. Harper & Row.
- Stopes, Marie (1924). Contraception (birth control), its theory, history and practice. London: John Bale, Sons & Danielsson, limited.
