= Today sponge =

Brand of spermacidal contraceptive device

The Today sponge is a brand of plastic contraceptive sponge saturated with a spermicide nonoxynol-9 to prevent conception. While initially popular in the 1980s in the United States, it is no longer commercially available as of 2019.

== History ==
The Today sponge dates back to 1976 when it was created by Bruce Ward Vorhauer. Vorhauer struggled for seven years to get the device approved and on the market. Following U.S. Food and Drug Administration (FDA) approval, the brand was rolled out in June 1981. The product, manufactured by VLI Corp. of Irvine, California, was classified as "relatively safe" by the FDA in 1984. A 1984 study in the American Journal of Obstetrics and Gynecology compared it with the diaphragm and found that the Today sponge was a "safe and acceptable method of contraception with an effectiveness rate in the range of other vaginal contraceptives."

The Today sponge "was manufactured until 1995, when FDA imposed new manufacturing standards." The product had several setbacks while marketed, including a link to toxic shock syndrome. Personal financial problems forced Vorhauer to sell the entire manufacturing operation to American Home Products, now Wyeth. Almost the entire content of the facility was moved to the Whitehall-Robbins facility in Hammonton, New Jersey, from its original California home. The sponge was removed from the U.S. market in 1994 after problems were found at the facility related to the deionized water system. The water system, which was originally sized for much larger production, could not produce the small amounts of deionized water required for this one product and became repeatedly contaminated. Based on slumping sales and to avoid any further FDA issues, Wyeth stopped selling the sponge rather than move production or modify its plant.

In 1998, Allendale Pharmaceuticals acquired the rights to the Today sponge and it was once again available. New FDA standards for manufacturing and record-keeping forced repeated delays, but the Today sponge was finally re-introduced in Canada in March 2003, and in the U.S. in September 2005. In January 2007, Allendale Pharmaceuticals was acquired by Synova Healthcare, Inc. In December 2007 Synova filed for bankruptcy reorganization; in 2008 the manufacturing rights to the Today sponge were purchased by Alvogen. In mid May 2009, Mayer Laboratories, Inc., the distributor of the Today sponge for the US, Canada and the EU, announced the Today sponge had been re-launched in the United States.

At the end of 2019, Mayer Labs had issues with the equipment to manufacture the Today sponge. As of the onset of the COVID pandemic, it is out of production with no information as to "when or if this situation will change."

== In popular culture ==
A 1995 Seinfeld episode, "The Sponge", revolves around Elaine's attempts to procure her favorite form of birth control, the discontinued Today sponge, and her rationing them based on whether a potential partner is "sponge-worthy". This was later revisited in the series finale when the pharmacist testifies against Elaine for buying a case of sixty sponges.
