= Diaphragm (birth control) =

Cervical barrier type of birth control

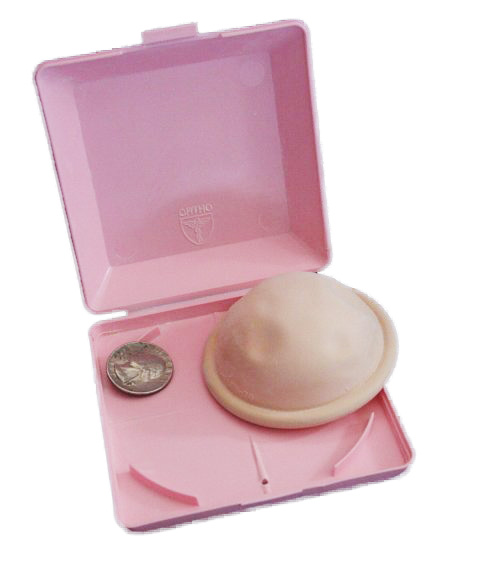
- An arcing spring diaphragm in its case, with a quarter added for scale.

Background
- Type: Barrier
- First use: 1880s

Failure rates (first year with spermicide)
- Perfect use: 6%
- Typical use: 12%

Usage
- Reversibility: Immediate
- User reminders: Inserted before sex with spermicide. Left in place for 6–8 hours afterwards
- Clinic review: For size fitting and prescribing in some countries

Advantages and disadvantages
- STI protection: Possible
- Periods: Catches menstrual flow
- Benefits: May be reused 1 to 3 years
- Risks: Urinary tract infection, toxic shock syndrome (rare)

The diaphragm is a barrier method of birth control. It is moderately effective, with a one-year failure rate of around 12% with typical use. It is placed over the cervix with spermicide before sex and left in place for at least six hours after sex. Fitting by a healthcare provider is generally required.

Side effects are usually very few. Use may increase the risk of bacterial vaginosis and urinary tract infections. If left in the vagina for more than 24 hours toxic shock syndrome may occur. While use may decrease the risk of sexually transmitted infections, it is not very effective at doing so. There are a number of types of diaphragms with different rim and spring designs. They may be made from latex, silicone, or natural rubber. They work by blocking access to and holding spermicide near the cervix.

The diaphragm came into use around 1882. It is on the World Health Organization's List of Essential Medicines.

== Medical use ==
Before inserting or removing a diaphragm, one's hands should be washed to avoid introducing harmful bacteria into the vaginal canal.

The rim of a diaphragm is squeezed into an oval or arc shape for insertion. A water-based lubricant (usually spermicide) may be applied to the rim of the diaphragm to aid insertion. One teaspoon (5 mL) of spermicide may be placed in the dome of the diaphragm before insertion, or with an applicator after insertion.

The diaphragm must be inserted sometime before sexual intercourse, and remain in the vagina for 6 to 8 hours after receiving ejaculate from the partner. For multiple acts of intercourse, it is recommended that an additional 5 mL of spermicide be inserted into the vagina (not into the dome—the seal of the diaphragm should not be broken) before each act. Upon removal, a diaphragm should be cleansed with mild soap and warm water before storage. The diaphragm must be removed for cleaning at least once every 24 hours and can be re-inserted immediately.

Oil-based products should not be used with latex diaphragms. Lubricants or vaginal medications that contain oil will cause the latex to rapidly degrade and greatly increases the chances of the diaphragm breaking or tearing.

Natural latex rubber will degrade over time. Depending on usage and storage conditions, a latex diaphragm should be replaced every one to three years. Silicone diaphragms may last much longer—up to ten years.

=== Effectiveness ===
The effectiveness of diaphragms, as of most forms of contraception, can be assessed two ways: method effectiveness and actual effectiveness. The method effectiveness is the proportion of couples correctly and consistently using the method who do not become pregnant. Actual effectiveness is the proportion of couples who intended that method as their sole form of birth control and do not become pregnant; it includes couples who sometimes use the method incorrectly, or sometimes not at all. Rates are generally presented for the first year of use. Most commonly the Pearl Index is used to calculate effectiveness rates, but some studies use decrement tables.

For all forms of contraception, actual effectiveness is lower than method effectiveness, due to several factors:

- mistakes on the part of those providing instructions on how to use the method
- mistakes on the part of the method's users
- conscious user non-compliance with method

For instance, someone using a diaphragm might be fitted incorrectly by a health care provider, or by mistake remove the diaphragm too soon after intercourse, or simply choose to have intercourse without placing the diaphragm.

Contraceptive Technology reports that the method failure rate of the diaphragm with spermicide is 6% per year.

The actual pregnancy rates among diaphragm users vary depending on the population being studied, with yearly rates of 10% to 39% being reported.

Unlike some other cervical barriers, the effectiveness of the diaphragm is the same for women who have given birth as for those who have not.

=== Advantages ===
The diaphragm does not interfere with a woman's menstrual cycle, therefore, no reversal or waiting time is necessary if contraception is no longer wanted or needed.

The diaphragm only has to be used during intercourse. Many women, especially those who have sex less frequently, prefer barrier contraception such as the diaphragm over methods that require some action every day.

Like all cervical barriers, diaphragms may be inserted several hours before use, allowing uninterrupted foreplay and intercourse. Most couples find that neither partner can feel the diaphragm during intercourse.

The diaphragm is less expensive than many other methods of contraception.

=== Sexually transmitted infections ===
There is some evidence that the cells in the cervix are particularly susceptible to certain sexually transmitted infections (STIs). Cervical barriers such as diaphragms may offer some protection against these infections. However, research conducted to test whether the diaphragm offers protection from HIV found that women provided with both male condoms and a diaphragm experienced the same rate of HIV infection as women provided with male condoms alone.

Because pelvic inflammatory disease (PID) is caused by certain STIs, diaphragms may lower the risk of PID. Cervical barriers may also protect against human papillomavirus (HPV), the virus that causes cervical cancer, although the protection appears to be due to the spermicide used with diaphragms and not the barrier itself.

Diaphragms are also considered a good candidate as a delivery method for microbicides (preparations that, used vaginally, protect against STIs) that are currently in development.

== Side effects ==
Women (or their partners) who are allergic to latex should not use a latex diaphragm.

Diaphragms are associated with an increased risk of urinary tract infection (UTI). Urinating before inserting the diaphragm, and also after intercourse, may reduce this risk.

Toxic shock syndrome (TSS) occurs at a rate of 2.4 cases per 100,000 women using diaphragms, almost exclusively when the device is left in place longer than 24 hours.

The increase in risk of UTIs may be due to the diaphragm applying pressure to the urethra, especially if the diaphragm is too large, and causing irritation and preventing the bladder from emptying fully. However, the spermicide nonoxynol-9 is itself associated with increased risk of UTI, yeast infection, and bacterial vaginosis. For this reason, some advocate use of lactic acid or lemon juice based spermicides, which might have fewer side effects.

In the early 1920s, Marie Stopes claimed that when wearing a diaphragm, the vagina is stretched such that certain movements made by the woman for the benefit of the man were restricted by the diaphragm spring. In later years there was some discussion of this, with two authors supporting this concept and one opposed. One of them argued in the later 1920s-1930s that while the muscle movement by women is restricted it does not make all that much difference since most "women (in the 1920s) are not able to operate their pelvic muscles voluntarily to the best advantage" (during sex). However, Stopes anticipated this rebuttal, and in so many words classified it as a lame excuse.

== Use without spermicide ==
It has been suggested that, for women who experience side effects from the spermicide nonoxynol-9, it may be acceptable to use the diaphragm without any spermicide. One study found an actual pregnancy rate of 24% per year in women using the diaphragm without spermicide; however, all women in this study were given a 60 mm diaphragm rather than being fitted by a clinician. Other studies have been small and given conflicting results. Insufficient studies have been conducted to conclusively determine effectiveness without spermicide. The current recommendation is still for all diaphragm users to use spermicide with the device.

== Types ==
Diaphragms are available in diameters of 50–105 mm (2.0–4.1 in). They are available in two different materials: latex and silicone. Diaphragms are also available with different types of springs in the rim.

An arcing spring folds into an arc shape when the sides are compressed. This is the strongest type of rim available in a diaphragm, and may be used by women with any level of vaginal tone. Unlike other spring types, arcing springs may be used by women with mild cystocele, rectocele, or retroversion. Arcing spring diaphragms may be easier to insert correctly than other spring types.

A coil spring flattens into an oval shape when the sides are compressed. This rim is not as strong as the arcing spring, and may only be used by women with average or firm vaginal tone. If an arcing spring diaphragm is uncomfortable for a woman or, during intercourse, her partner, a coil spring may prove more satisfactory. Unlike the arcing spring diaphragms, coil springs may be inserted with a device called an introducer.

A flat spring is much like a coil spring, but thinner. This type of rim may only be used by women with firm vaginal tone. Flat spring diaphragms may also be inserted with an introducer for women uncomfortable using their hands. Ortho used to manufacture a flat-spring diaphragm called the Ortho White. Reflexions also manufactured a flat-spring diaphragm up until 2014.

There are a number of variations. The SILCS diaphragm is made of silicone, has an arcing spring, and a finger cup is molded on one end for easy removal. The Duet disposable diaphragm is made of dipped polyurethane, pre-filled with BufferGel (BufferGel is currently in clinical trials as a spermicide and microbicide). Both the SILCS and Duet diaphragms come in only one size.

=== Fitting ===
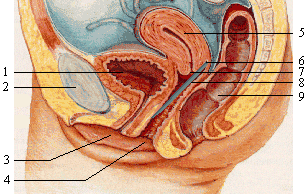
1: bladder, 2: pubic bone, 3: urethra, 4: vagina, 5: uterus, 6: fornix, 7: cervix, 8: diaphragm, 9: rectum

Diaphragms usually come in different sizes and require a fitting appointment with a health care professional to determine which size a woman should wear. Single size diaphragms that do not require fitting also exist.

A correctly fitting diaphragm will cover the cervix and rest snugly against the pubic bone. A diaphragm that is too small might fit inside the vagina without covering the cervix, or might become dislodged from the cervix during intercourse or bowel movements. It is also more likely that a woman's partner will feel the anterior rim of a diaphragm that is too small during intercourse. A diaphragm that is too large will place pressure on the urethra, preventing the bladder from emptying completely and increasing the risk of urinary tract infection. A diaphragm that is too large may also cause a sore to develop on the vaginal wall.

Diaphragms should be re-fitted after a weight change of 4.5 kg (10 lb) or more. The traditional clinical guideline is that a decrease in weight may cause a woman to need a larger size, although the strength of this relationship has been questioned.

Diaphragms should also be re-fitted after any pregnancy of 14 weeks or longer. Full-term vaginal delivery especially will tend to increase the size diaphragm a woman needs, although the changes to the pelvic floor during pregnancy mean even women who experience second-trimester miscarriage, or deliver by C-section, should be refitted.

Vaginal tenting, an increase in the length of the vagina, occurs during arousal. This means that during intercourse, the diaphragm will not fit snugly against the pubic bone because it is carried higher up the vaginal canal by the movement of the cervix. If the diaphragm is inserted after arousal has begun, extra care must be taken to ensure the device is covering the cervix.

A woman might be fitted with a different size diaphragm depending on where she is in her menstrual cycle. It is common for a woman to wear a larger diaphragm during menstruation. It has been speculated that a woman may be fitted with a larger size diaphragm when she is near ovulation. The correct size for a woman is the largest size that she can wear comfortably throughout her cycle.

In the United States, diaphragms are available by prescription only. Many other countries do not require prescriptions.

== Mechanism of action ==
The spring in the rim of the diaphragm forms a seal against the vaginal walls. The diaphragm covers the cervix, and physically prevents sperm from entering the uterus through the cervical canal.

Traditionally, the diaphragm has been used with spermicide, and it is widely believed that the spermicide is a significant factor in the effectiveness of the diaphragm. However, some have asserted that the diaphragm's mechanism of action is primarily as a physical barrier and that a diaphragm is effective without spermicides, but insufficient studies have been conducted to prove this.

It is widely taught that additional spermicide must be placed in the vagina if intercourse occurs more than six hours after insertion. However, there has been very little research on how long spermicide remains active within the diaphragm. One study found that spermicidal jelly and creme used in a diaphragm retained its full spermicidal activity for twelve hours after placement of the diaphragm.

It has long been recommended that the diaphragm be left in place for at least six or eight hours after intercourse. No studies have been done to determine the validity of this recommendation, however, and some medical professionals have suggested intervals of four hours or even two hours are sufficient to ensure efficacy. One manufacturer of contraceptive sponges recommends leaving the sponge in place for only two hours after intercourse. However, such use of the diaphragm (removal before 6 hours post-intercourse) has never been formally studied, and cannot be recommended.

It has been suggested that diaphragms be dispensed as a one-size-fits-all device, providing all women with the most common size (70 mm). However, only 33% of women fitted for a diaphragm are prescribed a 70 mm size, and correct sizing of the diaphragm is widely considered necessary.

== History ==
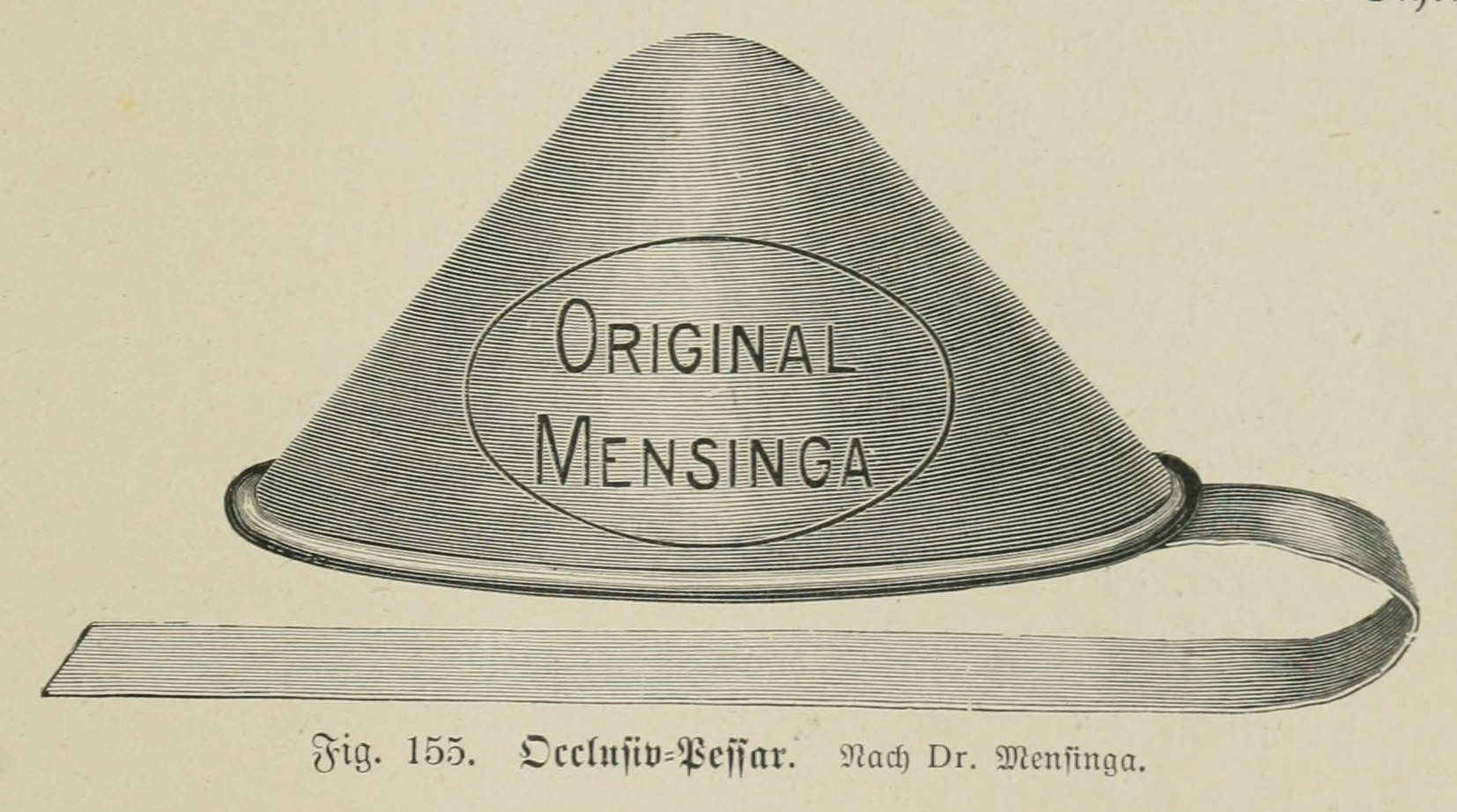
Mensinga "occlusive pessary" (1911)

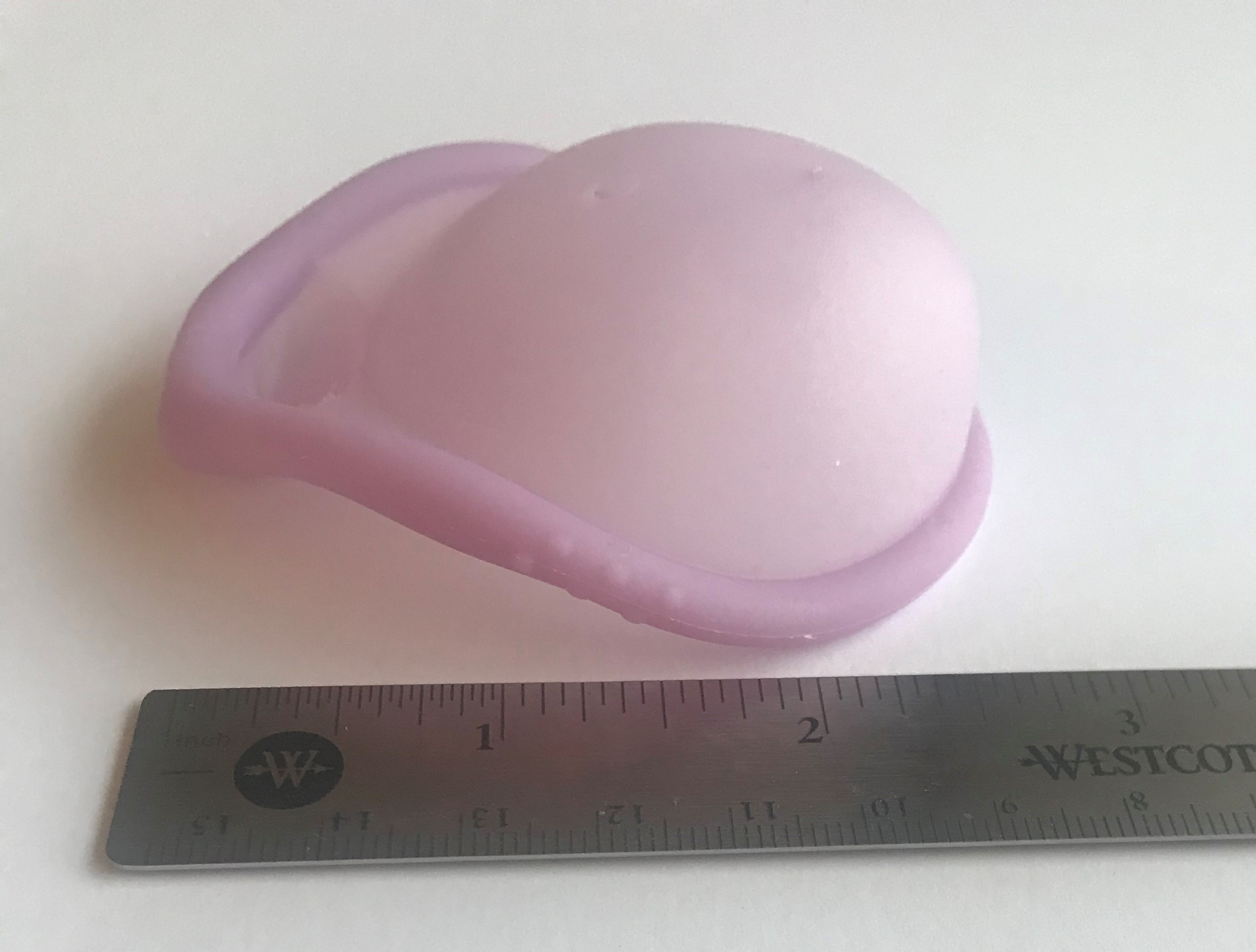
Photo of Caya diaphragm

The idea of blocking the cervix to prevent pregnancy is thousands of years old. Various cultures have used cervix-shaped devices such as oiled paper cones or lemon halves, or have made sticky mixtures that include honey or cedar resin to be applied to the cervical opening. However, the diaphragm—which stays in place because of the spring in its rim, rather than hooking over the cervix or being sticky—is of more recent origin.

An important precursor to the invention of the diaphragm was the rubber vulcanization process, patented by Charles Goodyear in 1844. In the 1880s, a German gynecologist, Wilhelm P. J. Mensinga, published the first description of a rubber contraceptive device with a spring molded into the rim. Mensinga wrote first under the pseudonym C. Hasse, and the Mensinga diaphragm was the only brand available for many decades. In the United States, the physician Edward Bliss Foote designed and sold an early form of occlusive pessary under the name "womb veil" starting in the 1860s.

American birth control activist Margaret Sanger fled to Europe in 1914 to escape prosecution under the Comstock laws, which prohibited sending contraceptive devices, or information about contraception, through the mail. Sanger learned about the diaphragm in the Netherlands and introduced the product to the United States when she returned in 1916. Sanger and her second husband, Noah Slee, illegally imported large quantities of the devices from Germany and the Netherlands. In 1925, Slee provided funding to Sanger's friend Herbert Simonds, who used the funds to found the first diaphragm manufacturing company in the U.S., the Holland-Rantos Company.

Diaphragms played a role in overturning the federal Comstock Act of 1873. In 1932, Sanger arranged for a Japanese manufacturer to mail a package of diaphragms to a New York physician who supported Sanger's activism. U.S. Customs confiscated the package and Sanger helped file a lawsuit. In 1936, in the court case United States v. One Package of Japanese Pessaries, a federal appellate court ruled that the package could be delivered.

Although in Europe, the cervical cap was more popular than the diaphragm, the diaphragm became one of the most widely used contraceptives in the United States. In 1940, one-third of all U.S. married couples used a diaphragm for contraception. The number of women using diaphragms dropped dramatically after the 1960s introduction of the intrauterine device and the combined oral contraceptive pill. In 1965, only 10% of U.S. married couples used a diaphragm for contraception. That number has continued to fall, and in 2002 only 0.2% of American women were using a diaphragm as their primary method of contraception.

In 2014 Janssen Pharmaceuticals announced the discontinuation of the Ortho-All Flex Diaphragm, making it very difficult for women in the U.S. to have that option as a birth-control method.

The single-sized, silicone diaphragm was developed by PATH during the late 2000s. It was licensed to Kessel Marketing & Vertriebs GmbH of Frankfurt, Germany, which began to market it as the Caya Diaphragm. The diaphragm was approved for contraception in Europe in 2013 and in the United States the following year. Since then, Kessel has also developed a traditionally circular, multi-sized diaphragm made from the same materials that they released in Germany in 2020 under the name Singa.

== Society and culture ==
=== Economics ===
In the United Kingdom, they cost the National Health Service less than £10 each. In the United States, they cost about US$15 to $75 and are the birth control method of 0.3% of women. These costs do not include that of spermicide.

=== Popular culture ===
In the fourth-season episode of Seinfeld, The Virgin, Elaine Benes describes how she tossed her purse and her diaphragm went flying out of it.

In the novel 11/22/63 by Stephen King, Sadie Dunhill tells Jake that her mother had given her a diaphragm when she got married, but that she threw it away because she and her husband never had sexual intercourse.

In the novel The Bell Jar by Sylvia Plath the protagonist Esther Greenwood is fitted with a diaphragm.
