= Shanghai Lily =

Shanghai Lily may refer to:

- A main character in the film Shanghai Express
- A brand of cervical cap available in China
