= Lucy Robins Lang =

American activist

Lucy Fox Robins Lang (March 30, 1884 – January 25, 1962) was an American activist involved with the American Federation of Labor (AFL) and the fight for amnesty for political prisoners. She is best known for her work with Emma Goldman and Samuel Gompers. Lang advocated for many political prisoners who had been charged under Wartime Emergency Laws. She was also a Zionist who helped raise money for settlements for Jewish refugees. Lang wrote about her life in an autobiography, Tomorrow is Beautiful (1948).

== Biography ==
Lang was born on March 30, 1884, in Kyiv, Ukraine and grew up in Korostyshev. Lang's paternal grandfather was a rabbi in Kyiv and was known as Reb Chiam the Hospitable. Lang's father went to America ahead of the family. The family moved to the United States when Lang was nine and they lived for a short time on the Lower East Side of New York City before settling in Chicago. She began to work in a cigar factory, where she was a good enough worker to make $20 a week. She also helped take care of her four younger siblings after work. Lang learned English at night school. She was also invited to start attending an anarchist study group. Lang also attended programs at Hull House and Jane Addams was a big influence on her life. Addams even asked her to work as an assistant dance instructor for Hull House.

When she was 16, she married Bob Robins and the couple set up their marriage as a "limited contract that either party could renew or break." The couple moved to New York City, partly because Lang's family strongly disapproved of the marriage. She and her husband met Emma Goldman in 1905 and both were involved in helping create the Free Speech League. The couple would also follow Goldman to California, where they lived in an anarchist commune. They also opened a vegetarian restaurant. Lang and her husband briefly separated, still viewing their marriage as a limited contract. The separation was considered "scandalous" and there was gossip printed about them in the newspapers in San Francisco. They stayed married for twenty years after their short separation. Lang also designed and used an "auto-house" which combined a portable printing press with a house trailer. Lang and her husband would travel the United States using the auto-house and complete printing jobs wherever they stopped. Lang, who was "mechanically inclined," drove the vehicle, which they called the Adventurer.

In 1916, Lang was involved in working on Tom Mooney's case to support his innocence. She was very involved in his defense case and used her connections with the Chicago labor movement to build political clout to secure Mooney's freedom. Lang and others created a labor defense committee to petition New York Governor Charles Seymour Whitman to stop the extradition of Alexander Berkman. It was believed that Berkman would not get a fair trial if he was extradited to San Francisco. In the end, the efforts of Lang and more than 200 labor leaders who helped petition Whitman ensured that Berkman was not extradited.

Goldman later asked Lang and another friend, Eleanor Fitzgerald, to organize a campaign for general amnesty for those who were convicted under Wartime Emergency Laws. Goldman herself was about to be imprisoned for a violation of the Selective Service Act of 1917. Together, Lang and Fitzgerald founded the League for Amnesty for Political Prisoners. Lang would eventually start working for amnesty for political prisoners through the American Federation of Labor (AFL). In 1919, Lang approached Samuel Gompers to encourage him to support amnesty. During their work, she and Gompers became friends. The first time the national convention of the AFL tried to pass an amnesty resolution, it failed. Lang asked a socialist lawyer, Morris Hillquit, to help her create a new resolution. By 1920, the AFL, through Lang's efforts, endorsed an amnesty resolution for political prisoners. The AFL's endorsement was a "major lift" for the amnesty movement. Lang differentiated her amnesty campaigns from other contemporary ones, by calling hers "constructive" as opposed to the others, which she considered "radical." She also believed that other campaigns for amnesty existed more to raise money than to provide actual aid. Lang ensured that her campaigns were funded by unions, not individual laborers. Lang worked as a mediator between the labor unions and Washington, D.C., officials. Her position at AFL was executive secretary of the amnesty committee. In 1921, Lang focused her energy on amnesty for Eugene Debs.

Lang and her husband began to have differences over her work for AFL and split up in the mid-1920s. On behalf of the AFL, Lang investigated working conditions for laborers in the South. She was also involved in helping during the 1927 Mine Workers Strike. Lang married Harry Lang, who was editor of the Jewish Daily Forward. The couple visited Europe, the Soviet Union and the Middle East all between 1928 and 1937. Lang became interested in Zionism and became the head of a group which raised funds to establish Kfar Blum, a kibbutz where German and Austrian refugees could safely emigrate.

Lang and her husband settled for a while in Croton, New York, in the mid-1940s, where Lang worked on her autobiography. They moved to Los Angeles later on and eventually lived in Beverly Hills. Lang died at Mt. Sinai hospital on January 25, 1962.

== Tomorrow is Beautiful ==
Lang's autobiography, Tomorrow is Beautiful (1948), tells her life story and also describes a history of the Jewish labor movement in the United States in early half of the twentieth century. Kirkus Reviews called the book an "excellent autobiography, as well as important historically for those interested in the labor movement."
