= Theodore Schroeder =

American lawyer

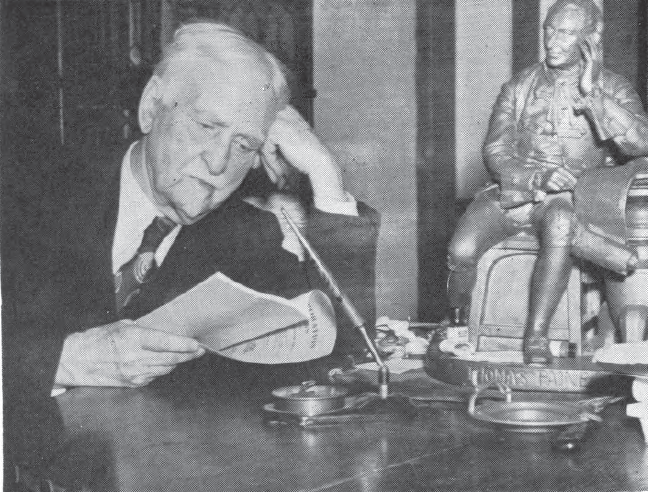
- Schroeder, circa 1952
- Born: September 17, 1864; Horicon, Wisconsin
- Died: February 10, 1953 (aged 88); Greenwich, Connecticut
- Education: University of Wisconsin
- Occupations: Lawyer, writer
- Known for: Free speech advocacy

Albert Theodore Schroeder (September 17, 1864 – February 10, 1953) was an American author who wrote on issues pertaining to freedom of expression. Schroeder challenged the state of freedom of speech in the United States by claiming that the US government may be a tyranny and that Americans view their liberties in a way that makes them hypocrites.

Schroeder was a freelance psychoanalyst who studied the sexual basis of all religious experience. His interest in free speech, as well as his psychosexual theories, led him to study the controversial life of the 19th-century free speech and women's rights advocate Ida C. Craddock.

== Career ==
Schroeder entered the University of Wisconsin in 1882 to study engineering and earned a law degree in 1889. Schroeder practiced law for ten years in Salt Lake City, Utah, working for statehood for Utah.

In 1900, Schroeder moved to New York. In 1902, he formed the Free Speech League, a precursor to the American Civil Liberties Union, with Lincoln Steffens and others. Schroeder helped defend his anarchist friend Emma Goldman at her Denver trial.

In 1904, Schroeder retired from practicing law and began writing. In his later years, he lived in Greenwich, Connecticut.

At the time of Schroeder's death, his friend Lesley Kuhn was preparing for publication another book consisting of reprints of articles written by Schroeder, which were mainly anti-Mormon in nature. The headings of the articles were "Incest in Mormonism," "Polygamy in Congress," "Polygamy and the Constitution," "Polygamy and Inspired Lies," "The Sex-Determinant in Mormon Theology," "Mormonism and Prostitution," "Proxies in Mormon Polygamy," "Was Joseph Smith, 'The Prophet,' an Abortionist?," "Sadism in Mormonism," and "Sanctified Lust."

His writings became the subject of a lawsuit after his death. In his will, Schroeder left his estate to two friends with the instruction for the money from the estate to be used to gather his voluminous writings and publish them. Two of Schroeder's cousins contested the will and successfully voided it.

When upholding a lower court's decision, Judge O'Sullivan of the Connecticut Supreme Court stated in a unanimous three-judge opinion:

The law will not declare a trust valid when the object of the trust, as the finding discloses, is to distribute articles which reek of the sewer. The very enumeration of some of the titles which Schroeder selected for his writings brands them indelibly, and a reading of the article which he called "Prenatal Psychisms and Mystical Pantheism" is a truly nauseating experience in the field of pornography. The trust is invalid as being contrary to public policy.

== Works ==
- Al. Smith, The Pope and The Presidency, 1928
- Divinity in Semen
- Erotogenesis of Religion
- Lucifer's Lantern, 1898-1900 (A collection of nine periodicals)
- Obscene Literature and Constitutional Law, 1911.
- Phallic Worship to Secularized Sex
- Shaker Celibacy and Salacity
- What About You? 1951 (Was a compilation which consisted, in part, of articles criticizing religious beliefs and questioning the existence of God. The titles of certain of its chapters were "The Love-Hate Complex," "Three Attitudes toward Sex," "Why Is Obscenity?" "Where Is Obscenity?" "'Obscenity' and Mental Health," "My Bigotry," and "My Envy.")
- Why Priests Don't Marry
