= Nonoxynol-9 =

- Partially condensed skeletal formula of nonoxynol-9

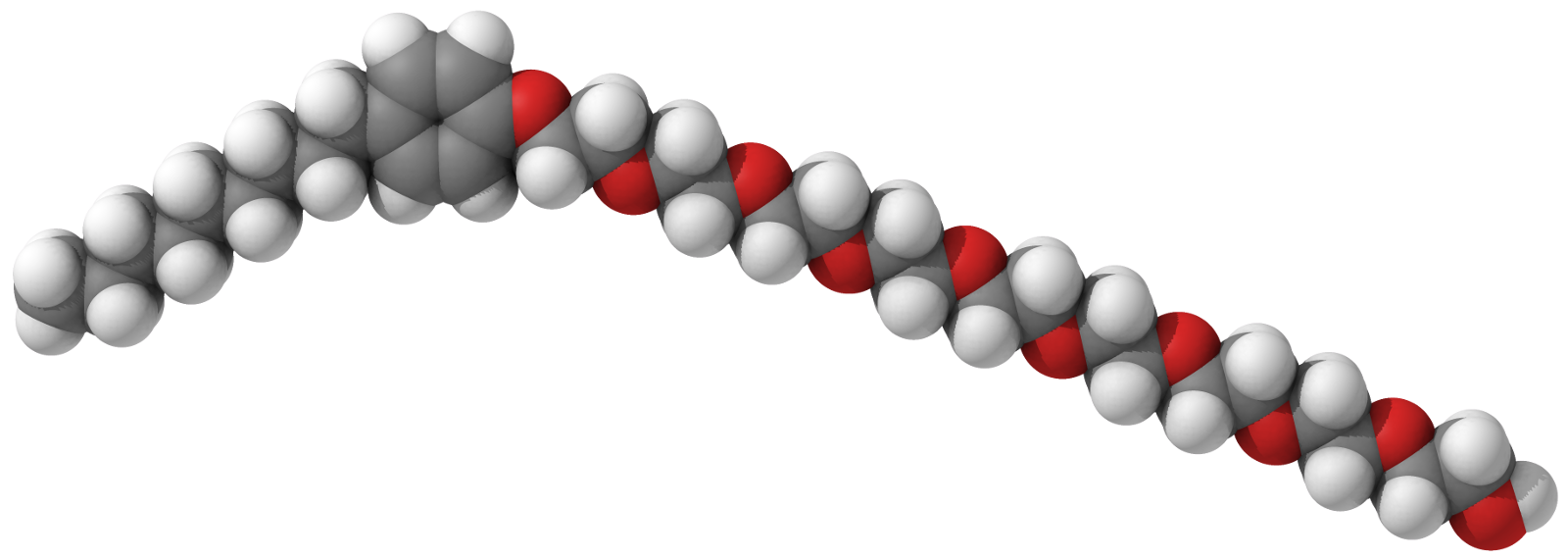
- Ball-and-stick model of a nonoxynol-9 molecule.

Names
- Preferred IUPAC name 26-(4-Nonylphenoxy)-3,6,9,12,15,18,21,24-nonaoxahexacosan-1-ol
- Other names 1-(4-Nonylphenyl)-1,4,7,10,13,16,19,22,25-nonaoxaheptacosan-27-ol

Identifiers
| CAS Number | 26027-38-3 |
| 3D model (JSmol) | Interactive image; Interactive image; Interactive image |
| Beilstein Reference | 2031786 |
| ChEBI | CHEBI:53775 |
| ChEMBL | ChEMBL1410 |
| ChemSpider | 65319 |
| DrugBank | DB06804 |
| ECHA InfoCard | 100.043.454 |
| EC Number | 247-816-5 |
| KEGG | D06490 |
| MeSH | Nonoxynol |
| PubChem CID | 72385 |
| UNII | 48Q180SH9T |
| CompTox Dashboard (EPA) | DTXSID00858720 |
- InChI: InChI=1S/C33H60O10/c1-2-3-4-5-6-7-8-9-32-10-12-33(13-11-32)43-31-30-42-29-28-41-27-26-40-25-24-39-23-22-38-21-20-37-19-18-36-17-16-35-15-14-34/h10-13,34H,2-9,14-31H2,1H3 Key: FBWNMEQMRUMQSO-UHFFFAOYSA-N
- SMILES: CCCCCCCCCc1ccc(OCCOCCOCCOCCOCCOCCOCCOCCOCCO)cc1; CCCCCCCCCC1=CC=C(OCCOCCOCCOCCOCCOCCOCCOCCOCCO)C=C1; O(c1ccc(cc1)CCCCCCCCC)CCOCCOCCOCCOCCOCCOCCOCCOCCO

Properties
| Chemical formula | C_{33}H_{60}O_{10} |
| Molar mass | 616.833 g·mol^{−1} |
| log P | 4.02 |

Pharmacology
| Routes of administration | Topical |
- Except where otherwise noted, data are given for materials in their standard state (at 25 °C [77 °F], 100 kPa). verify (what is ?) Infobox references

Nonoxynol-9, sometimes abbreviated as N-9, is an organic compound that is used as a surfactant. It is a member of the nonoxynol family of nonionic surfactants. N-9 and related compounds are ingredients in various cleaning and cosmetic products. It is widely used in contraceptives for its spermicidal properties.

== Uses ==
=== Spermicide ===
As a spermicide, it attacks the acrosomal membranes of the sperm, causing the sperm to be immobilized. Nonoxynol-9 is the active ingredient in most spermicidal creams, jellies, foams, gel, film, and suppositories.

=== Lubricant ===
Nonoxynol-9 is a common ingredient of most vaginal and anal lubricants due to its spermicidal properties.

A 2004 study found that over a six-month period, the typical-use failure rates for five nonoxynol-9 vaginal contraceptives (film, suppository, and gels at three different concentrations) ranged from 10% to 20%.

=== Condoms ===
Many models of condoms are lubricated with solutions containing nonoxynol-9. In this role, it has been promoted as a backup method for avoiding pregnancy and a microbicide for sexually transmitted diseases in the event of condom failure. However, the 2001 WHO / CONRAD Technical Consultation on Nonoxynol-9 concluded that: There is no published scientific evidence that N-9-lubricated condoms provide any additional protection against pregnancy or STDs compared with condoms lubricated with other products. Since adverse effects due to the addition of N-9 to condoms cannot be excluded, such condoms should no longer be promoted. However, it is better to use N-9-lubricated condoms than no condoms.

Compared to regular lubricated condoms, condoms containing nonoxynol-9 present another disadvantage — they are limited by the shelf-life of the spermicide.

=== Cervical barriers ===
Almost all brands of diaphragm jelly contain nonoxynol-9 as the active ingredient. This jelly may also be used for a cervical cap. Most contraceptive sponges contain nonoxynol-9 as an active ingredient.

=== Shaving cream ===
Nonoxynol-9 is sometimes included in shaving creams for its properties as a nonionic surfactant; it helps break down skin oils that normally protect hair from moisture, so that they become wet and, hence, softer and easier to shave. Gillette formerly used nonoxynol-9 for this purpose in its Foamy products, but has discontinued the practice.

=== Sports cream ===
Nonoxynol-9 is also found in Bengay Vanishing Scent as an inactive ingredient.

=== Poison ivy creams ===
Nonoxynol-9 is also found in Zanfel poison ivy cream. It effectively helps to break up the oil urushiol that causes the rash.

== Side effects ==
From 1996 to 2000, a UN-sponsored study conducted in several locations in Africa followed nearly 1,000 sex workers who used nonoxynol-9 gels or a placebo. The HIV infection rate among those using nonoxynol-9 was about 50% higher than those who used the placebo; those using nonoxynol-9 also had a higher incidence of vaginal lesions, which may have contributed to this increased risk. Whereas these results may not be directly applicable to lower-frequency use, these findings combined with lack of any demonstrated HIV-prevention benefit from nonoxynol-9 use led the World Health Organization to recommend that it no longer be used by those at high risk of HIV infection. The WHO further notes that "Nonoxynol-9 offers no protection against sexually transmitted infections such as gonorrhoea, chlamydia." A 2006 study of a nonoxynol-9 vaginal gel in female sex workers in Africa concluded that it did not prevent genital human papillomavirus (HPV) infection and could increase the virus's ability to infect or persist.
