= BufferGel =

BufferGel is the brand name of a spermicide and microbicide gel which is being tested for its potential development into a preventive medicine to stop the transmission of HIV.

== Testing ==
In macaques, after BufferGel's effect on microflora and pH were measured by vaginal colposcopy and rectal lavage researchers determined that it fit the safety profile of a drug which could be tested on humans.

A phase I clinical trial done on women in India, Thailand gave supporting evidence that users tolerate the drug well. A similar trial in the United States also showed drug tolerance.
