= Free Speech League =

US progressive organization (founded 1902)

The Free Speech League was a progressive organization in the United States that fought to support freedom of speech in the early 20th century. The League focused on combating government censorship, particularly relating to political speech and sexual material. It was a predecessor of the American Civil Liberties Union.

== History ==
The Free Speech League's main advocates included Edward Bliss Foote, his son Edward Bond Foote, Emma Goldman, and Theodore Schroeder. Other free speech advocates of the era included Ezra Heywood, Ben Reitman, Moses Harman, and D. M. Bennett. The League was formed in 1902. Two other members involved in the League's creation were Bob Robins and Lucy Robins Lang. In 1908, its goals were reported as "freedom of peaceable assembly, of discussion and of propaganda; an uncensored press, telegraph and telephone; an uninspected express; an inviolable mail." To achieve its goals, the League worked through the press, public speaking, and the courts and felt that "the education of brains and quickening of consciences are first in order of time and effect." Its Secretary at the time was A. C. Pleydell of 175 Broadway in New York City.

The League was officially incorporated on April 7, 1911, in Albany, New York. Its charter included the goal "by all lawful means to oppose every form of government censorship over any method for the expression, communication or transmission of ideas... and to promote such legislative enactments and constitutional amendments, state and national, as will secure these ends."

One of the primary targets of the League was the Comstock Laws. After the American Civil War, a social purity movement grew in strength and wasbaimed at outlawing vice in general and prostitution and obscenity in particular. Composed primarily of Protestant moral reformers and middle-class women, the Victorian-era campaign also attacked contraception, which was viewed as an immoral practice that promoted prostitution and venereal disease. A leader of the purity movement was Anthony Comstock, a postal inspector who successfully lobbied for the passage of the 1873 Comstock Act, a federal law prohibiting the mailing of any material deemed to be obscene or related to sex in any way. Many states also passed similar state laws, which were collectively known as the "Comstock Laws" and sometimes extended the federal law by outlawing the use and distribution of contraceptives. Comstock took pride in being personally responsible for thousands of arrests and the destruction of hundreds of tons of books and pamphlets.

When a British anarchist, John Turner, was arrested under the Anarchist Exclusion Act and threatened with deportation, Emma Goldman joined forces with the Free Speech League to champion his cause. The League enlisted the aid of Clarence Darrow and Edgar Lee Masters, who took Turner's case to the US Supreme Court. Although Turner and the League lost, Goldman considered the Casablanca to be a victory of propaganda. She had returned to anarchist activism, but it was taking its toll on her. "I never felt so weighed down," she wrote to Berkman. "I fear I am forever doomed to remain public property and to have my life worn out through the care for the lives of others."

Margaret Sanger supported the cause of free speech throughout her career with a zeal comparable to her support for birth control. Sanger had grown up in a home in which the agnostic and iconoclastic orator Robert Ingersoll was admired. During the early years of her activism, Sanger viewed birth control primarily as a free speech issue, rather than a feminist issue. When she started publishing The Woman Rebel in 1914, she did so with the express goal of provoking a legal challenge to the Comstock Laws banning the dissemination of information about contraception. In New York State, Emma Goldman introduced Sanger to members of the Free Speech League, such as Edward Bliss Foote and Theodore Schroeder, and the League later provided funding and advice to help Sanger with her legal battles.

Around 1917 to 1919, the League gradually disbanded. Many of its members later joined the American Civil Liberties Union.

== Works by members ==
- Flower, Benjamin Orange; Schroeder, Theodore; Post, Louse, In Defense of Free Speech: Five Essays from the Arena, 1908
- Free Speech and the New Alien Law, Press Bulletins No. 1 and No 2. December 1903.
- Schroeder, Theodore, Freedom of the Press and 'Obscene' Literature: Three Essays. 1906
- Schroeder, Theodore, Constructive Obscenity, 1907
- Schroeder, Theodore, Our Vanishing Liberty of the Press, 1907
- Schroeder, Theodore, The Scientific Aspect of Due Process Law and Constructive Crimes, 1908.
- Schroeder, Theodore, The Conflict Between Religious and Ethical Science, 1909.
- Schroeder, Theodore, (Ed.), Free Press Anthology, Free Speech League, 1909.
- Schroeder, Theodore, Constitutional free speech defined and defended in an unfinished argument in a case of blasphemy, Free Speech League, 1919
- Wakeman, Thaddeus, Administrative Process of the Postal Department: A Letter to the President, 1906.

== See also ==
- Birth control movement in the United States
