= Contraceptive sponge =

Birth control device

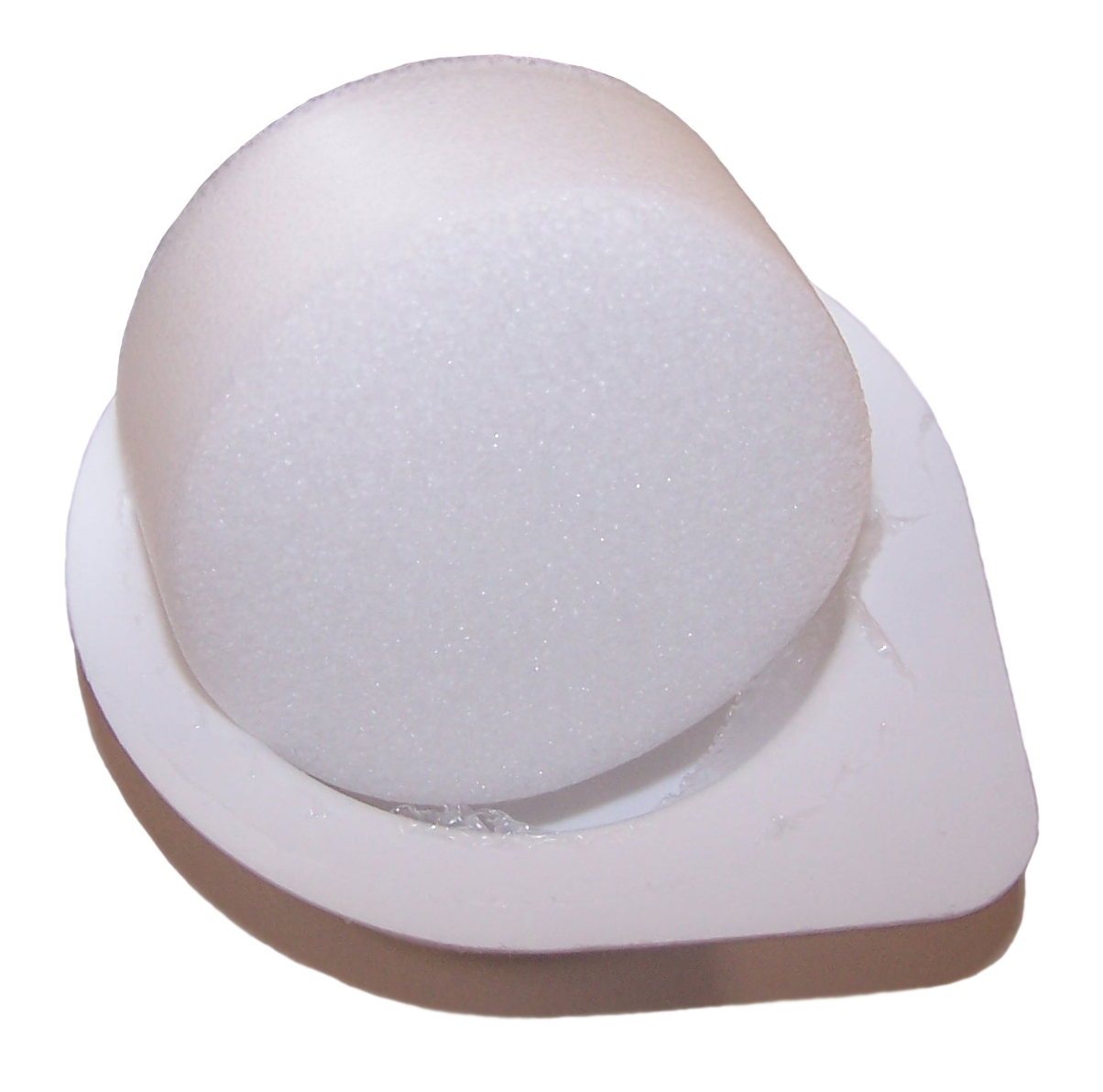
- Protectaid sponge, in its plastic tray. It is removed from the tray before use.

Background
- Type: Barrier
- First use: 1983
- Trade names: Today, Safe-T

Failure rates (first year)
- Perfect use: Nulliparous:9% Parous:20%
- Typical use: Nulliparous:12% Parous:24%

Usage
- Reversibility: Immediate
- User reminders: ?

Advantages and disadvantages
- STI protection: No
- Benefits: May be inserted 12–24 hours before intercourse
- Risks: yeast infection, rarely toxic shock syndrome

The contraceptive sponge is a contraceptive which combines barrier and spermicidal methods to prevent conception. Sponges work in two ways. First, the sponge is inserted into the vagina, so it can cover the cervix and prevent any sperm from entering the uterus. Secondly, the sponge contains spermicide.

== Use ==
The sponges are inserted vaginally prior to intercourse and must be placed over the cervix to be effective. Sponges provide no protection from sexually transmitted infections. Sponges can provide contraception for multiple acts of intercourse over a 24-hour period, but cannot be reused beyond that time or once removed.

Sponges are a physical barrier, trapping sperm and preventing their passage through the cervix into the reproductive system. The spermicide is an important component of pregnancy prevention.

== Effectiveness ==
The sponge’s effectiveness is 91% if used perfectly by women who have never given birth, and 80% if used perfectly by women who have given birth at least once. Since it is hard to use the sponge perfectly every time having vaginal sex, its real effectiveness can be lower, and it is advised to combine sponges with other birth control methods, like withdrawal of penis before ejaculation or condoms.

== Side effects ==
People sensitive to Nonoxynol-9, an ingredient in the spermicide used in the sponge, may experience unpleasant irritation and may face increased risk of sexually transmitted infections. Sponge users may have a slightly higher risk of toxic shock syndrome.

== In popular culture ==
Shortly after they were taken off the U.S. market, the sponge was featured in an episode of the sitcom Seinfeld titled "The Sponge". In the episode, Elaine Benes conserves her remaining sponges by choosing to not have intercourse unless she is certain her partner is "sponge-worthy".
