= Coitus interruptus =

Withdrawal method of birth-control

Background
- Type: Behavioral
- First use: Ancient

Failure rates (first year)
- Perfect use: 4%
- Typical use: 20%

Usage
- Reversibility: Yes
- User reminders: ?
- Clinic review: None

Advantages and disadvantages
- STI protection: No

Coitus interruptus, also known as withdrawal, pulling out or the pull-out method, is an act of birth control during sexual intercourse, whereby the penis is withdrawn from a vagina prior to ejaculation so that the ejaculate (semen) may be directed away in an effort to avoid insemination.

This method was used by an estimated 38 million couples worldwide in 1991. Coitus interruptus does not protect against sexually transmitted infections (STIs).

== History ==
Perhaps the oldest description of the use of the withdrawal method to avoid pregnancy is the story of Onan in the Torah and the Bible. This text is believed to have been written over 2,500 years ago. Societies in the ancient civilizations of Greece and Rome preferred small families and are known to have practiced a variety of birth control methods. There are references that have led historians to believe withdrawal was sometimes used as birth control. However, these societies viewed birth control as a woman's responsibility, and the only well-documented contraception methods were female-controlled devices (both possibly effective, such as pessaries, and ineffective, such as amulets).

After the decline of the Roman Empire in the 5th century CE, contraceptive practices fell out of use in Europe; the use of contraceptive pessaries, for example, is not documented again until the 15th century. If withdrawal was used during the Roman Empire, knowledge of the art may have been lost during its decline.

From the 18th century until the development of modern methods, withdrawal was one of the most popular methods of birth-control practised globally.

== Effects ==
Like many methods of birth control, reliable effect is achieved only by correct and consistent use. Observed failure rates of withdrawal vary depending on the population being studied: American studies have found actual failure rates of 15–28% per year. One US study, based on self-reported data from the 2006–2010 cycle of the National Survey of Family Growth, found significant differences in failure rate based on parity status. Women with 0 previous births had a 12-month failure rate of only 8.4%, which then increased to 20.4% for those with 1 prior birth and again to 27.7% for those with 2 or more.

An analysis of Demographic and Health Surveys in 43 developing countries between 1990 and 2013 found a median 12-month failure rate across subregions of 13.4%, with a range of 7.8–17.1%. Individual countries within the subregions were even more varied. A large scale study of women in England and Scotland during 1968–1974 to determine the efficacy of various contraceptive methods found a failure rate of 6.7 per 100 woman-years of use. This was a “typical use” failure rate, including user failure to use the method correctly. In comparison, the combined oral contraceptive pill has an actual use failure rate of 2–8%, while intrauterine devices (IUDs) have an actual use failure rate of 0.1–0.8%. Condoms have an actual use failure rate of 10–18%. However, some authors suggest that actual effectiveness of withdrawal could be similar to the effectiveness of condoms; this area needs further research. (See Comparison of birth control methods.)

For couples that use coitus interruptus consistently and correctly at every act of intercourse, the failure rate is 4% per year. This rate is derived from an educated guess based on a modest chance of sperm in the pre-ejaculate. In comparison, the pill has a perfect-use failure rate of 0.3%, IUDs a rate of 0.1–0.6%, and internal condoms a rate of 2%.

It has been suggested that the pre-ejaculate ("Cowper's fluid") emitted by the penis prior to ejaculation may contain spermatozoa (sperm cells), which would compromise the effectiveness of the method. However, several small studies have failed to find any viable sperm in the fluid. While no large conclusive studies have been done, it is believed by some that the cause of method (correct-use) failure is the pre-ejaculate fluid picking up sperm from a previous ejaculation. For this reason, it is recommended that the male partner urinate between ejaculations, to clear the urethra of sperm, and wash any ejaculate from objects that might come near the woman's vulva (such as hands and penis).

However, recent research suggests that this might not be accurate. A contrary, yet non-generalizable study that found mixed evidence, including individual cases of a high sperm concentration, was published in March 2011. A noted limitation to these previous studies' findings is that pre-ejaculate samples were analyzed after the critical two-minute point. That is, looking for motile sperm in small amounts of pre-ejaculate via microscope after two minutes – when the sample has most likely dried – makes examination and evaluation "extremely difficult". Thus, in March 2011 a team of researchers assembled 27 male volunteers and analyzed their pre-ejaculate samples within two minutes after producing them. The researchers found that 11 of the 27 men (41%) produced pre-ejaculatory samples that contained sperm, and 10 of these samples (37%) contained a "fair amount" of motile sperm (in other words, as few as 1 million to as many as 35 million). This study therefore recommends, in order to minimize unintended pregnancy and disease transmission, the use of condoms from the first moment of genital contact. As a point of reference, a study showed that, of couples who conceived within a year of trying, only 2.5% included a male partner with a total sperm count (per ejaculate) of 23 million sperm or less. However, across a wide range of observed values, total sperm count (as with other identified semen and sperm characteristics) has weak power to predict which couples are at risk of pregnancy. Regardless, this study introduced the concept that some men may consistently have sperm in their pre-ejaculate, due to a "leakage," while others may not.

Similarly, another robust study performed in 2016 found motile sperm in the pre-ejaculate of 16.7% (7/42) healthy men. What more, this study attempted to exclude contamination of sperm from ejaculate by drying the pre-ejaculate specimens to reveal a fern-like pattern, characteristics of true pre-ejaculate. All pre-ejaculate specimens were examined within an hour of production and then dried; all pre-ejaculate specimens were found to be true pre-ejaculate. It is widely believed that urinating after an ejaculation will flush the urethra of remaining sperm. However, some of the subjects in the March 2011 study who produced sperm in their pre-ejaculate did urinate (sometimes more than once) before producing their sample. Therefore, some males can release the pre-ejaculate fluid containing sperm without a previous ejaculation.

== Advantages ==
The advantage of coitus interruptus is that it can be used by people who have objections to, or do not have access to, other forms of contraception. Some people prefer it so they can avoid possible adverse effects of hormonal contraceptives or so that they can have a full experience and be able to "feel" their partner. Reasons for the popularity of the method are: that it has no direct monetary cost, requires no artificial devices, has no physical side effects, can be practiced without a prescription or medical consultation, and provides no barriers to stimulation.

== Disadvantages ==
Compared to the other common reversible methods of contraception such as IUDs, hormonal contraceptives, and male condoms, coitus interruptus is less effective at preventing pregnancy. As a result, it is also less cost-effective than many more effective methods: although the method itself has no direct cost, users have a greater chance of incurring the risks and expenses of either child-birth or abortion. The only models finding cost savings associated with the choice of withdrawal as a birth control method are those which assume all couples practice perfect use of the method.

The method is largely ineffective in the prevention of sexually transmitted infections (STIs), like HIV, since pre-ejaculate may carry viral particles or bacteria which may infect the partner if this fluid comes in contact with mucous membranes. However, a reduction in the volume of bodily fluids exchanged during intercourse may reduce the likelihood of disease transmission compared to using no method due to the smaller number of pathogens present.

== Prevalence ==
Based on data from surveys conducted during the late 1990s, 3% of women of childbearing age worldwide rely on withdrawal as their primary method of contraception. Regional popularity of the method varies widely, from a low of 1% in Africa to 16% in Western Asia.

In the United States, according to the National Survey of Family Growth (NSFG) in 2014, 8.1% of reproductive-aged women reported using withdrawal as a primary contraceptive method. This was a significant increase from 2012 when 4.8% of women reported the use of withdrawal as their most effective method. However, when withdrawal is used in addition to or in rotation with another contraceptive method, the percentage of women using withdrawal jumps from 5% for sole use and 11% for any withdrawal use in 2002, and for adolescents from 7.1% of sole withdrawal use to 14.6% of any withdrawal use in 2006–2008.

When asked if withdrawal was used at least once in the past month by women, use of withdrawal increased from 13% as sole use to 33% ever use in the past month. These increases are even more pronounced for adolescents 15 to 19 years old and young women 20 to 24 years old. Similarly, the NSFG reports that 9.8% of unmarried men who have had sexual intercourse in the last three months in 2002 used withdrawal, which then increased to 14.5% in 2006–2010, and then to 18.8% in 2011–2015. The use of withdrawal varied by the unmarried man's age and cohabiting status, but not by ethnicity or race. The use of withdrawal decreased significantly with increasing age groups, ranging from 26.2% among men aged 15–19 to 12% among men aged 35–44. The use of withdrawal was significantly higher for never-married men (23.0%) compared with formerly married (16.3%) and cohabiting (13.0%) men.

For 1998, about 18% of married men in Turkey reported using withdrawal as a contraceptive method.

== See also ==
- Coitus reservatus
- Coitus saxonicus
- Masturbation
