= Decrement table =

Tables used to calculate the probability of certain events

Decrement tables, also called life table methods, are used to calculate the probability of certain events.

== Birth control ==
Life table methods are often used to study birth control effectiveness. In this role, they are an alternative to the Pearl Index.

As used in birth control studies, a decrement table calculates a separate effectiveness rate for each month of the study, as well as for a standard period of time (usually 12 months). Use of life table methods eliminates time-related biases (i.e. the most fertile couples getting pregnant and dropping out of the study early, and couples becoming more skilled at using the method as time goes on), and in this way is superior to the Pearl Index.

Two kinds of decrement tables are used to evaluate birth control methods. Multiple-decrement (or competing) tables report net effectiveness rates. These are useful for comparing competing reasons for couples dropping out of a study. Single-decrement (or noncompeting) tables report gross effectiveness rates, which can be used to accurately compare one study to another.

== See also ==
- Survival analysis
