= Spermicide =

Contraceptive that destroys sperm

Background
- Type: Spermicide
- First use: Ancient

Failure rates (first year)
- Perfect use: 6%
- Typical use: 16%

Usage
- Reversibility: Immediate
- User reminders: More effective if combined with a barrier method

Advantages and disadvantages
- STI protection: No
- Weight gain: No
- Benefits: Provides lubrication

Spermicide is a contraceptive substance that destroys sperm, inserted vaginally prior to intercourse to prevent pregnancy. As a contraceptive, spermicide may be used alone. However, the pregnancy rate experienced by couples using only spermicide is higher than that of couples using other methods. Usually, spermicides are combined with contraceptive barrier methods such as diaphragms, condoms, cervical caps, and sponges. Combined methods are believed to result in lower pregnancy rates than either method alone.

Spermicides are usually unscented, clear, unflavored, non-staining, and lubricative.

== Types and effectiveness ==
The most common active ingredient of spermicides is nonoxynol-9. Spermicides containing nonoxynol-9 are available in many forms, such as jelly (gel), films, and foams. Used alone, spermicides have a perfect use failure rate of 6% per year when used correctly and consistently, and 16% failure rate per year in typical use.

=== Spermicide brands ===
This list of examples was provided by the Mayo Clinic:

1. VCF Vaginal Contraceptive Film
2. VCF Vaginal Contraceptive Gel
3. VCF Contraceptive Foam
4. Conceptrol
5. Crinone
6. Encare
7. Endometrin
8. First-Progesterone VGS
9. Gynol II
10. Prochieve
11. Today sponge
12. Vagi-Gard Douche Non-Staining

Nonoxynol-9 is the primary chemical in spermicides to inhibit sperm motility. Active secondary spermicidal ingredients can include octoxynol-9, benzalkonium chloride and menfegol. These secondary ingredients are not mainstream in the United States, where nonoxynol-9 alone is typical. Preventing sperm motility will inhibit the sperm from travelling towards the egg moving down the fallopian tubes to the uterus. The deep proper insertion of spermicide should effectively block the cervix so that sperm cannot make it past the cervix to the uterus or the fallopian tubes. A study observing the distribution of spermicide containing nonoxynol-9 in the vaginal tract showed “After 10 min the gel spread within the vaginal canal providing a contiguous covering of the epithelium of variable thickness.” The sole goal of spermicide is to prevent fertilization.

Menfegol is a spermicide manufactured as a foaming tablet. It is available only in Europe.

Octoxynol-9 was previously a common spermicide, but was removed from the U.S. market in 2002 after manufacturers failed to perform new studies required by the FDA.

The spermicides benzalkonium chloride and sodium cholate are used in some contraceptive sponges. Benzalkonium chloride might also be available in Canada as a suppository.

The 2008 Ig Nobel Prize (a parody of the Nobel Prizes) in Chemistry was awarded to Sheree Umpierre, Joseph Hill, and Deborah Anderson, for discovering that Coca-Cola is an effective spermicide, and to C.Y. Hong, C.C. Shieh, P. Wu, and B.N. Chiang for proving it is not.

Lemon juice solutions have been shown to immobilize sperm in the laboratory, as has Krest Bitter Lemon drink. While the authors of the Krest Bitter Lemon study suggested its use as a postcoital douche, this is unlikely to be effective, as sperm begin leaving the ejaculate (out of the reach of any douche) within 1.5 minutes of deposition. No published studies appear to have been done on the effectiveness of lemon juice preparations in preventing pregnancy, though they are advocated by some as 'natural' spermicides.

Lactic acid preparations have also been shown to have some spermicidal effect, and commercial lactic acid-based spermicides are available. A contraceptive containing lactic acid, citric acid, and potassium bitartrate (Phexxi) was approved for use in the United States in May 2020.

Extractives of the neem plant such as neem oil have also been proposed as spermicides based on laboratory studies. Animal studies of creams and pessaries derived from neem have shown they have contraceptive effects; however, trials in humans to determine its effectiveness in preventing pregnancy have not yet been conducted.

== Use with condoms ==
Spermicides are believed to increase the contraceptive effectiveness of condoms.

However, condoms that are spermicidally lubricated by the manufacturer have a shorter shelf life and may cause urinary tract infections in women. The World Health Organization says that spermicidally lubricated condoms should no longer be promoted. However, they recommend using a nonoxynol-9 lubricated condom over no condom at all.

Spermicides used alone are only about 91 percent effective. When spermicides are used in conjunction with condoms and other barrier methods there is a 97 percent effective rate for pregnancy prevention.

== Side effects ==
Temporary local skin irritation involving the vulva, vagina, or penis is the most common problem associated with spermicide use.

Frequent use (two times or more a day) of nonoxynol-9 containing spermicide is inadvisable if STI/HIV exposure is likely, because in this situation there is increased vulvovaginal epithelial disruption and increased risk of HIV acquisition.

In 2007, the United States Food and Drug Administration (FDA) mandated that labels for nonoxynol-9 over-the-counter (OTC) contraceptive products carry a new warning saying they do not protect against STDs and HIV/AIDS.

== History ==
The first written record of spermicide use is found in the Kahun Papyrus, an Egyptian document dating to 1850 BCE. It described a pessary of crocodile dung and fermented dough. It is believed that the low pH of the dung may have had a spermicidal effect.

Further formulations are found in the Ebers Papyrus from approximately 1500 BCE. It recommended mixing seed wool, acacia, dates and honey, and placing the mixture in the vagina. It probably had some effectiveness, in part as a physical barrier due to the thick, sticky consistency, and also because of the lactic acid (a known spermicide) formed from the acacia.

Writings by Soranus, a 2nd-century Greek physician, contained formulations for a number of acidic concoctions claimed to be spermicidal. His instructions were to soak wool in one of the mixtures, then place near the cervix.

Laboratory testing of substances to see if they inhibited sperm motility began in the 1800s. Modern spermicides nonoxynol-9 and menfegol were developed from this line of research. However, many other substances of dubious contraceptive value were also promoted. Especially after the prohibition of contraception in the U.S. by the 1873 Comstock Act, spermicides—the most popular of which was Lysol—were marketed only as "feminine hygiene" products and were not held to any standard of effectiveness. Worse, many manufacturers recommended using the products as a douche after intercourse, too late to affect all the sperm. Medical estimates during the 1930s placed the pregnancy rate of women using many over-the-counter spermicides at seventy percent per year.

A misconception about spermicides existed in the 1980s and 1990s. A 1988 literature review article noted that in vitro studies of nonoxynol-9 and other spermicides showed inactivation of STI pathogens, including HIV. But a 2002 systemic review and meta-analysis of nine randomized controlled trials of vaginal nonoxynol-9 for HIV and STI prevention involving more than 5,000 women (predominantly sex workers) found no statistically significant reduction in risk of HIV and STIs, but found a small statistically significant increase in genital lesions among nonoxynol-9 spermicide users. And in a high-risk population using a nonoxynol-9 vaginal gel more than three applications per day on average, the risk of HIV acquisition was increased.

== See also ==
- Personal lubricant
- Contraceptive sponge
