= Microbicides Development Programme =

Microbicides Development Programme is an organisation based in London which promotes the study of microbicides for sexually transmitted diseases.

== Oversight ==
The Microbicides Development Programme is funded by the Department for International Development through the Medical Research Council. The organisation is coordinated MRC Clinical Trials Unit and the Imperial College London at St Mary's Hospital. The organisation was founded on 25 January 2006.

== PRO 2000 ==
The MDP conducting testing of the microbicide gel PRO 2000 in sub-Saharan Africa starting in 2005.
