= Chanchlani Global Health Research Award =

Canadian health sciences award

The Chanchlani Global Health Research Award is a Canadian health sciences award that recognizes a world leading scholar in the area of Global Health. Each year a discipline within Global Health (i.e. Determinants of Health, Policy Development, and Innovative Solutions) is chosen by the internal review committee at McMaster University. The review committee then selects the leading researcher based on interview and impact in the field. The award recipient receives a monetary prize of $5,000 and opportunity to present their research findings to researchers and students.

The award provides opportunities for informal scientific exchanges between the scientist/scholar and faculty, postdoctoral fellows, graduate and undergraduate medical students. The award was created by the Chanchlani Family through $1 Million endowment along with a $250,000 donation at McMaster University in 2012.

== Award recipients ==
Source: McMaster University

- 2025:
  - Dr. Quarraisha Abdool Karim: Preventing HIV in Women: Three Decades of Trials and Tribulations
  - Dr. Salim S. Abdool Karim: Achieving the 2030 AIDS Goal in Africa: Role of Long-Acting PrEP
- 2023: Dr. Michelle A. Williams: Perspectives on Uncovering Triggers of Acute Perinatal Outcomes: An Epidemiological and Molecular Approach
- 2022: Dr. Dean Karlan: When Wonky Works: Success, Failures and Learning Gaps in Implementation Science for Public Policy
- 2021: Dr. Nadine Caron: Perspectives of a First Nations physician in Canada: Do you ever wonder what we think?
- 2020: Dr. Jonathan Patz: Can actions to solve today’s climate crisis create the largest health opportunity of our times?
- 2019: Dr. Camara Phyllis Jones, Tools for Achieving Healthy Equity: Allegories on "Race" and Racism
- 2018: Dr. Dariush Mozaffarian
- 2017: Dr. John Ioannidis, Improving Research Practices: A Global Challenge
- 2016: Dr. Vikram Patel, The Black Dog: Why We Don’t Care
- 2015: Professor Dr. Ab Osterhaus, Head of the Department of Virology of the Erasmus MC Rotterdam
- 2014: Dr. Hans Rosling, PhD, MD, Professor of International Health, Karolinska Institute
- 2012: Dr. Madhukar Pai MD, PhD, Associate Professor of Epidemiology, McGill University, The freakonomics of TB control in India and Dr. Nikika Pant Pai, MD, MPH, PhD, Associate Professor of Medicine, McGill University, Point-of-care tests for HIV: innovation, synergy and impact (joint awards)

== See also ==
- List of medicine awards
- List of awards named after people
