= Quarraisha Abdool Karim =

South African researcher (born 1960)

Quarraisha Abdool Karim FRS
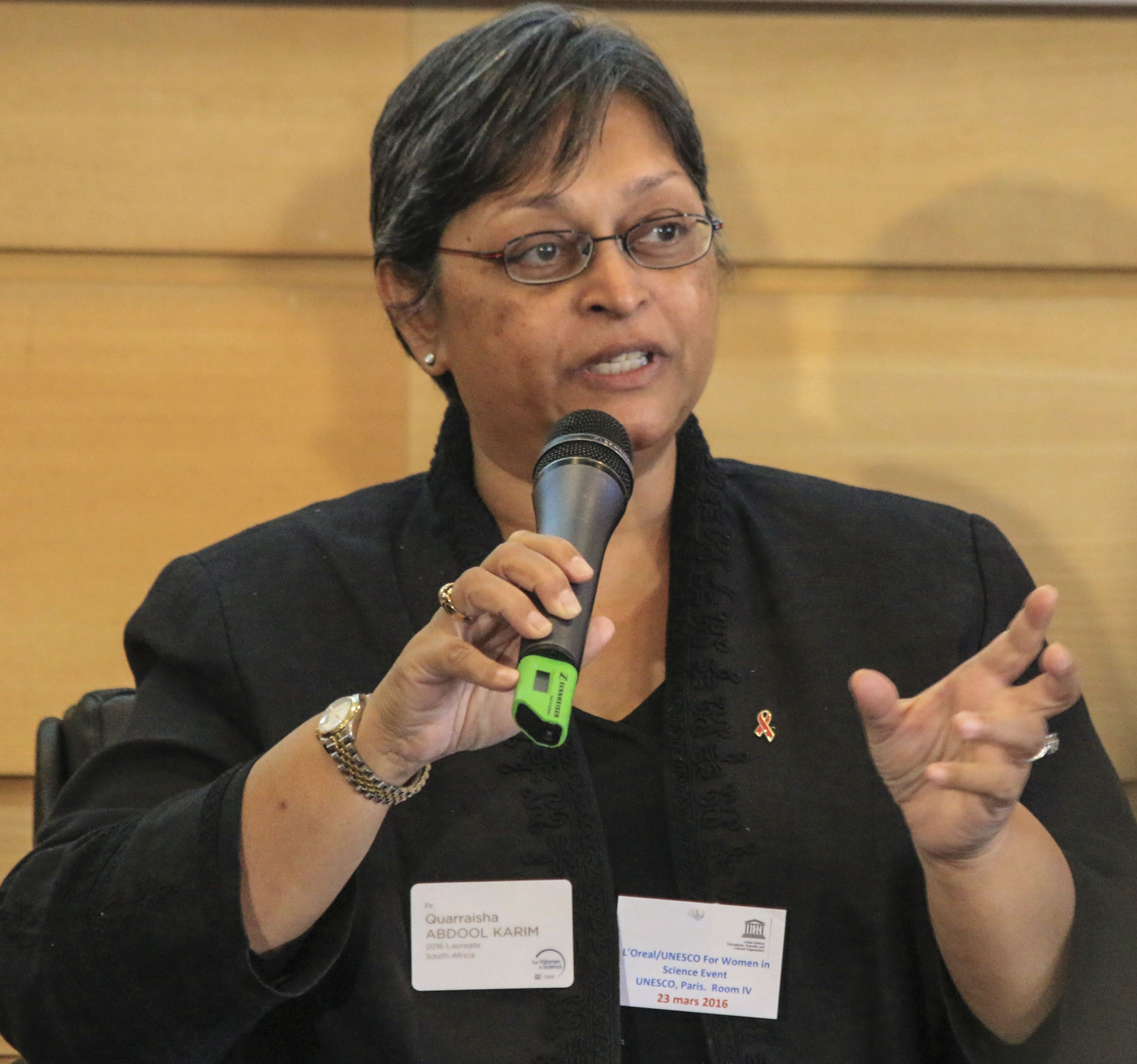
- March 2016
- Born: 20 March 1960 (age 66); Tongaat
- Education: University of Durban-Westville; University of Witwatersrand; Columbia University; University of Natal
- Known for: HIV/AIDS research
- Spouse: Salim Abdool Karim
- Awards: Canada Gairdner Global Health Award; Christophe Merieux Award; Order of Mapungubwe; L'Oreal-Unesco Women in Science; Honorary Doctorate
- Scientific career
- Fields: Epidemiology
- Workplaces: Columbia University
- Website: www.publichealth.columbia.edu/profile/quarraisha-abdool-karim-phd

Quarraisha Abdool Karim is an infectious diseases epidemiologist and co-founder and Associate Scientific Director of CAPRISA. She is a professor in Clinical Epidemiology, Columbia University, New York and Pro-Vice Chancellor for African Health, University of KwaZulu-Natal, South Africa.

== Early life and education ==
Abdool Karim was born in Tongaat in South Africa in 1960. She attended Vishwaroop state-aided school, Victoria school, and Tongaat high school. She cites her grandmother and parents as some of her mentors, instilling in her a passion for knowledge. In 1981, she graduated with a Bachelor of Science from the University of Durban-Westville. Abdool Karim then moved on to the University of Witwatersrand, gaining a bachelor of science honours degree in Biochemistry. For her master's degree, Abdool Karim moved to the United States, gaining her master's in Parasitology in 1988, from Columbia University. In 2000, she completed her PhD in Medicine from the University of Natal, in South Africa.

== Career ==
Abdool Karim is the UNAIDS Special Ambassador for Adolescents and HIV and co-chairs the UNAIDS Advisory Group to the executive director. She is the Executive Group Member of the Steering Committees for the WHO COVID-19 Solidarity Therapeutics Trial and the WHO COVID-19 Solidarity Vaccines Trial. Abdool Karim co-chairs the United Nations 10-Sustainable Development Goal 10 Member Technology Facilitation Mechanism (TFM); is a member of the PEPFAR Scientific Advisory Board; and serves on the Board of Directors of Friends of the Global Fight Against AIDS, Tuberculosis and Malaria (USA). Abdool Karim is Deputy-Chair of the WHO Alliance for Sexual and Reproductive Health; the Scientific Advisory Board Member of the Indlela: Behavioural Insights for Better Health; and Member of the CAPRISA Board of Control.

Abdool Karim's research over the past 32 years has focused on preventing HIV infection in adolescent girls and young women. This includes the conduct of clinical trials from early phase, through proof of concept and implementation of new discoveries. Her landmark study, the tenofovir gel CAPRISA 004 trial, demonstrated for the first time that anti-retrovirals can prevent HIV infection. The study was highlighted by the journal Science as one of the top 10 scientific breakthroughs in 2010. Abdool Karim has over 200 peer-reviewed publications; edited several books, contributed several book chapters including co-editing the 6th and 7th edition of the Oxford Textbook on Global Public Health. She has played a central role in building the science base in southern Africa through the Columbia University – Southern African Fogarty AIDS International Training and Research Programme that has trained over 600 scientists in southern Africa. She is an elected member of the National Academy of Medicine (USA); and Fellow of The World Academy of Science, Royal Society of South Africa, Academy of Science of South Africa and the African Academy of Science. She is a South African National Research Foundation A1 rated scientist.

Abdool Karim's scientific contributions in highlighting the vulnerability of young women, the need for women-initiated technologies and integration of HIV prevention efforts into sexual reproductive health services has been recognised by more than 30 local and international prestigious awards including South Africa's highest honour, the Order of Mapungubwe, from the President of South Africa. In 2020 Abdool Karim received three prestigious awards for her scientific work in HIV prevention and women's health: The John Dirks Canada Gairdner Award for Global Health; the Christophe Mérieux Prize from the French Academies of Sciences; and the 500 years of the Straits of Magellan Award from the Chilean government. She is the 2021 John F.W. Herschel Medal recipient from the Royal Society of South Africa. She is the recipient of the African Union Kwame Nkrumah Award for Scientific Excellence; the TWAS-Lenovo Prize from The World Academy of Sciences (TWAS); the ASSAf Science-for-Society Gold Medal; the South African Medical Research Council Gold Medal; the 2016 L'Oréal-UNESCO Women in Science award for Africa and the Arab States; the Lifetime Achievement Award from the Institute of Human Virology in the USA; and the 2018 HPTN Ward Cates Spirit Award. She received honorary doctoral degrees (Honoris Causa) from the University of Johannesburg (2017) and the University of Stellenbosch (2020) in South Africa. She is a Living Legend for the City of Durban – an honour bestowed by the city for citizens who have made an exemplary contribution to increase the profile of the city nationally and internationally. Abdool Karim was co-awarded the 2024 Lasker-Bloomberg Public Service Award, together with Salim Abdool Karim.

== HIV Research ==
In the 1990s, South Africa was gripped by an HIV epidemic. During this time, Abdool Karim began her socio-behavioural studies in relation to HIV, in South Africa. She conducted population-based surveys, aiming to the understand the spread of the epidemic in women, as well as researching on additional factors such as gender, age, and migration. In 1992, Abdool Karim et al. published a paper, highlighting that women were more vulnerable to the HIV infection. The study also found a correlation between migration and HIV. This correlation was found to be particularly emphasized among men. During the 1990s, Abdool Karim conducted numerous studies and wrote a handful of papers, studying the infection and highlighting the different groups who were more at risk to the disease.

In 2007, CAPRISA conducted a landmark clinical trial, named CAPRISA 004, and Abdool Karim was the principal investigator. The underlying aim of this study was to investigate the effects of Tenefovir gel in reducing the risk of HIV contraction. The CAPRISA 004 Tenofovir gel trial also resulted in a proof of concept for Microbicides. Overall, the study demonstrated protection against the HIV infection, with a 39% reduction in infections. Additionally, at the XVIII International AIDS Conference, 2010, the results of their CAPRISA 004 study led to a standing ovation, an uncommon occurrence at a scientific meeting. In 2017, with other leaders from the project, Abdool Karim edited The CAPRISA Clinical Trials: HIV Treatment and Prevention.

Since this project, Abdool Karim has continued to research and publish writing about HIV/AIDS in South Africa. She published the book HIV/AIDS in South Africa with her husband and research collaborator Salim Abdool Karim in 2005, with the second edition published in 2010. In 2015, she co-edited the sixth edition of the Oxford Textbook of Global Public Health. In 2017 she was appointed by the executive director of the Joint United Nations Programme on HIV and AIDS (UNAIDS) as the UNAIDS Special Ambassador for Adolescents and HIV.

== Leadership and working for equality ==
Outside of her research in HIV and AIDS, Abdool Karim has also worked to improve education and training for scientists in South Africa and served as an advocate for women in science. Through the Columbia University-Southern African Fogarty AIDS International Training and Research Programme, Abdool Karim has worked to train over 600 scientists in the region since 1998.

She has also spoken and given interviews explaining the difficulties associated with being a woman in research as well as encouraging more young women to pursue the sciences.

== Awards and honours ==
Abdool Karim has won many awards for her work on AIDS research. This includes the TWAS-Lenovo Science prize. Here, she became the first women recipient of that award, receiving the $100,000 prize.

- 2010: CAPRISA 004 Trials highlighted by Science as one of the Top 10 scientific breakthroughs of the year
- 2011: Olusegun Obasanjo Prize
- 2013: Order of Mapungubwe (Bronze)
- 2014: TWAS-Lenovo Science Prize
- 2014: SAMRC Scientific Merit Award (Gold)
- 2014: ASSAF Science-for-Society Award (Gold)
- 2015: eThekwini Living Legends Award
- 2016: L'Oreal-UNESCO Award for Women in Science
- 2020: Canada Gairdner Global Health Award
- 2020: Christophe Mérieux Prize
- 2020: Straits of Magellan Award
- 2022: VinFuture Prize
- 2024: Lasker~Bloomberg Public Service Award
- 2025: Fellow of the Royal Society
- 2025, Honorary Doctorate

In 2017, the BBC named Abdool Karim as one of the seven trailblazing women in science.

== Personal life ==
Quarraisha Abdool Karim is married to the South African epidemiologist, Salim Abdool Karim, whom she sometimes collaborates with on research. She has three children.

Abdool Karim owns a house in Durban.
