= Multipurpose prevention technology =

Multipurpose prevention technologies (MPTs) are a class of products designed to address at least two health issues simultaneously, often focusing on sexual and reproductive health which includes contraception, human immunodeficiency virus (HIV) prevention, other sexually transmitted infection (STI) preventions, such as genital infection by human simplex virus (HSV) infection and human papillomavirus (HPV) infection. For example, MPTs can combine contraception and HIV prevention, contraception and other STI prevention, or the prevention of multiple STIs. Since the simultaneous use of multiple products with a single indication against each specific sexual and reproductive health issue is inconvenient, this method may affect adherence. As a result, the goal of developing a MPT as an all-in-one product is to combat this issue.

As a note, these products can be still be utilized by individuals who wish to conceive, as well as breastfeeding and pregnant individuals, since some MPTs include HIV and STI prevention but do not include contraceptives.

*In this article, the terms "male" and "female" are used to refer to biological sex.

== Types ==
A range of MPT products have been in development. The development pipeline includes different designs, product types, and configurations. While condoms are the only one available MPT product on the market, other MPTs in different dosage forms are still in various phases of clinical and preclinical development.

MPT products that are available:

- Condoms - Male and female condoms are the only MPT products currently available on the market. They are a non-hormonal form of MPT that combines contraception and HIV/STI preventions. Male condoms are 87% effective in preventing pregnancy in actual use, and up to 98% effective under perfect use, and provide more than 90% protection against STI pathogens.

MPT products in clinical development:

- Intravaginal rings - Intravaginal rings are polyermic and flexible rings that are inserted into the vagina and delivers the drug to the surrounding vaginal tissue. They are sustained formulations that takes from days to months for drug release. There are already intravaginal rings on the market that act solely as contraceptives, but intravaginal rings that can act as MPTs are still in development.
- Semisolids (Gels/creams/ointments) - Semisolids are topical formulations used to deliver a drug to the desired tissue. They are commonly used via the vaginal and rectal route. Among the multiple semisolid forms, gels are preferred. There are vaginal gels, creams, and ointment available on the market that act as vaginal products. Studies are being done to test vaginal gels with different microbicides for their effectiveness at preventing HIV and STI transmissions.
- Diaphragms with added microbicides - A diaphragm is a physical barrier that can be inserted into the vagina prior to heterosexual intercourse that stops sperm from reaching the uterus. They are currently used in combination with contraceptive gels and spermicides to add a chemical component to blocking sperm. In its usage as a MPT, once effective candidates for vaginal gels are developed, they can be used together to provide contraception as well as HIV/STI prevention.
- Vaginal tablets and inserts (pessaries)- Vaginal tablets and inserts can be used for both prevention and treatment. They dissolve in the vaginal cavity after administration. Vaginal tablets and inserts contain hydrophilic polymers such as carbomers and sodium alginate to provide a mucoadhesive properties to allow time for drug release. Vaginal tablets and inserts are easy to use and handle as they provide precise dosing and have good stability. However, an applicator is needed for administration which increases the cost. There are already vaginal tablets and inserts available on the market that works as various prevention or treatment uses such as contraception, hormone replacement therapy, etc., but their use as MPTs to prevent unintended pregnancy, HIV, and STIs are still in the process of development.
- Vaginal films - Vaginal films are soft and thin sheets. They dissolve in the vaginal cavity after administration. Vaginal films contain many active ingredients and bioadhesive polymers to allow time for drug release. There are immediate and sustained formulation for vaginal films. Vaginal films are easy to use and handle. There are already vaginal films available on the market that act solely as contraceptives, but their use for preventing unintended pregnancy, HIV, and STIs as MPTs are still in the process of development.
- Microarray patches - A microarray patch is a patch with a layer of micro-needles on the surface that can inject the desired medication into the skin the patch is applied to. This allows developers to utilize drugs that are not orally available, and it also has the potential of allowing more convenient administration of drugs that may normally only be given through injections. Such patches are being developed to prevent pregnancy and HIV transmission, but there are limitations since the size of a patch that could inject enough of a medication to achieve these goals may not be practical.
- Injectables - There are injectable contraceptions and antiretroviral therapy (ART) for PrEP approved for use; however, injectables (intramuscular and subcutaneous routes) for MPT use are not available on the market yet.
- Implants - There are implants available solely for contraceptives or HIV PrEP; however, the use of MPT is still under study.
- Nanosystems and microsystems - Nanosystems and microsystems are being studied to act as drug carriers during the development of vaginal MPTs. They can provide a longer residence time of the drug in the vaginal cavity for drug to release. However, the cost of nanosystems and microsystems is expensive and their long-term effects are limited.

There is no published data to support the development of oral MPT products. One of the major concerns is that there are many considerations when incorporating multiple different active pharmaceutical ingredients into a single small oral pill (tablets or capsules) for multiple indications. In addition, there are very limited material options for oral pills that can maintain a longer residence time due to the acidic pH in human's GI tract.

== Prevalence ==
HIV, other STIs, and unintended pregnancy continue to be a public health concern worldwide, all sharing a common link of exposure. The importance of MPTs has been recognized for some time now, and condoms serve as an excellent example. However, the potential impact of preventing HIV infection through condoms has been diminished due to lack of usage among females and males. As of 2022, approximately 39 million people worldwide are currently living with HIV; around 374 million new cases of STIs arise each year, and nearly half (45%) of all pregnancies are unintended.

== History ==
STIs in humans have been documented since ancient times, with genetic evidence indicating HSV-2 infection over 1.5 million years ago. Similarly, the history of contraception also traces back to antiquity. The oldest male barrier contraceptives are condoms or penile sheaths, with the earliest forms of condoms being made from animal parts or chemically-treated linen. Italian anatomist Gabriello Fallopiio claimed to have invented the linen sheath condom in 1564, with the intent to protect against syphilis. There were many other forms of condoms utilized by different ethnic groups, such as oiled silk paper by the Chinese and tortoise-shell, horn, or fine leather sheaths by the Japanese. It wasn't until the rubber vulcanization process invented by Charles Goodyear that the first rubber condom was made in 1855. In 1993, the female condom was introduced with a similar objective, to provide protection against STIs and unintended pregnancies. There have been many discussions around MPTs for decades now, but barrier methods remain the only MPT product widely available.

The MPT field emerged from the microbicide field, a natural extension from the microbicide field's focus on women-controlled methods to prevent HIV acquisition. In 1998, the Alliance for Microbicide Development was formed; however, it was disbanded and funding for microbicide research was reduced after clinical trials for multiple microbicides did not show prevention of HIV transmission. In 2009, CAMI Health convened a multidisciplinary international meeting in Berkeley, California to formalize the MPT field which brought attention back to microbicides. The aim of developing the MPT field was to prevent against any combination of HIV, other STIs, and unintended pregnancy. In 2011, the first major funding opportunity for MPT development was released by the National Institutes of Health.

== Advantages ==
MPTs provide prevention for multiple indications. Because of this, MPTs have the opportunity to revolutionize sexual health.

MPTs can help increase adherence to HIV pre-exposure prophylaxis (PrEP) by decreasing the number of clinic visits to address family planning and sexual health topics. Furthermore, because MPTs address multiple preventative care needs in one product, MPTs have the opportunity to increase adherence by decreasing the number of total administrations an individual may be responsible for. Additionally, MPTs can reduce the stigma surrounding HIV and STI prevention by combining prevention for these indications into contraceptives, a less stigmatized product.

The successful development of MPTs could also pave the way for similar technologies to improve reproductive health more comprehensively. These advancements could encompass issues such as vaginal inflammation from infections, miscarriage and premature birth, cancer, menstrual cramps, or wound healing from trauma or childbirth.

== Opportunities for Improvement ==
Currently, male and female condoms are the only approved MPTs. While condoms are advantageous because of their protection against multiple indications, challenges may still arise between partners when negotiating condom use in intimate settings. For this reason, it is important to continue to develop alternate MPT candidates to provide individuals more options for prevention.

A survey was done in parts of sub-Saharan Africa which indicated that 96% of surveyed women prefer MPTs over single indication products. Despite this preference, there is limited funding for MPTs, which can make it difficult for individuals to gain access and afford these products. Going forward, there are opportunities to improve accessibility to help ensure individuals who can benefit from these products are able to obtain them in an accessible and affordable manner.
