= Eric Ohuma =

Kenyan doctor and professor

- Born: Kenya
- Education: University of Oxford; Maseno University
- Scientific career
- Workplaces: London School of Hygiene and Tropical Medicine
- Thesis: Statistical issues in the study of fetal and neonatal growth

Eric Ohuma is a Kenyan medical statistician and epidemiologist who is a professor at the London School of Hygiene and Tropical Medicine. His research focuses on maternal, newborn and child health. He was lead statistician on the Intergrowth-21st project that defined the international standards for pregnancy dating and monitoring foetal size.

== Early life and education ==
Ohuma studied applied statistics at Maseno University. He completed an MSc in Medical Statistics at the London School of Hygiene and Tropical Medicine. After completing his undergraduate studies he started a doctorate at the University of Oxford developing statistical protocols for foetal and neonatal growth.

== Career and research ==
Ohuma combines medical statistics and epidemiology to develop methods for measuring growth and development across pregnancy, infancy and childhood. He started his research career as a statistics intern at the KEMRI Wellcome Trust Research Centre in Kenya. He later joined the University of Oxford, where he served as statistician for the Intergrowth 21st project, which developed standards that have been adopted in a number of clinical and research settings internationally. At Oxford, Ohuma contributed to the development of international standards for pregnancy dating, monitoring foetal growth during pregnancy, newborn size at birth, postnatal growth in preterm infants, and gestational weight gain. He was awarded the Oxford Students' Union Teaching Award for Most Acclaimed Lecturer.

He joined the Hospital for Sick Children as a Senior Research Fellow in Child Growth and Development. Ohuma joined the London School of Hygiene and Tropical Medicine. He was promoted to professor in 2024.

== Selected publications ==
- Betty Raman; Mark Philip Cassar; Elizabeth M Tunnicliffe; et al. (2021). "Medium-term effects of SARS-CoV-2 infection on multiple vital organs, exercise capacity, cognition, quality of life and mental health, post-hospital discharge". EClinicalMedicine. 31 100683. doi:10.1016/j.eclinm.2020.100683. PMC 7808914. PMID 33490928. Wikidata Q121075548.
- José Villar; Leila Cheikh Ismail; Cesar G. Victora; et al. (International Fetal and Newborn Growth Consortium for the 21st Century (INTERGROWTH-21st)) (2014). "International standards for newborn weight, length, and head circumference by gestational age and sex: the Newborn Cross-Sectional Study of the INTERGROWTH-21st Project". The Lancet. 384 (9946): 857–868. doi:10.1016/s0140-6736(14)60932-6. PMID 25209487. Wikidata Q40221407.
- Aris T Papageorghiou; Stephen H Kennedy; Laurent J Salomon; et al. (International Fetal and Newborn Growth Consortium for the 21(st) Century (INTERGROWTH-21(st))) (2018). "The INTERGROWTH-21st fetal growth standards: toward the global integration of pregnancy and pediatric care". American Journal of Obstetrics and Gynecology. 218 (2S): S630–S640. doi:10.1016/j.ajog.2018.01.011. PMID 29422205. Wikidata Q48501747.
