= Shack fires in South Africa =

Hazard affecting shack settlements in South Africa

Fire is a serious hazard in shack settlements in South Africa. It has been argued that "On average in South Africa over the last five years there are ten shack fires a day with someone dying in a shack fire every other day." In 2011, 151 were reported to have been killed in shack fires in Cape Town. It was reported that in 2014, 2,090 people burned to death in the Gauteng province, "many of them in shack fires that sweep through informal settlements".

== Causes of shack fires ==
Shack fires are often termed accidents but this has been contested by shack dweller's organisations. Martin J. Murray argues that by "recruiting human frailty or sheer accident to their cause, key city-builders have been able to rationalize municipal policy-choices that have accomplished little toward changing the circumstances under which the urban poor—who bear the awful brunt of these continuing cycles of death and destruction — tend to invariably find themselves in harm’s way."

Matt Birkinshaw lists the key reasons for shack fires as lack of land, lack of housing, denial of access to electricity, adequate water and to adequate emergency services.

== Responses to shack fires ==
The charitable NGO 'Children of Fire' offers support for victims of fires, and in particular to children.

The shack dwellers' social movement Abahlali baseMjondolo has campaigned against what it perceives as the failure of the state to address the problem of shack fires and organised people to connect themselves directly to the electricity grid.

== See also ==
- Lumkani, a social enterprise launched by South African Students to deliver a networked heat detector device to decrease risks of fire in rural and urban informal settlements.
