= Vaginal microbicide =

Microbicide for vaginal use

- Specialty: Gynecology

A vaginal microbicide is a microbicide for vaginal use, generally as protection against the contraction of a sexually transmitted infection during vaginal sexual intercourse. Vaginal microbicides are topical gels or creams inserted into the vagina.

== Target market ==
Researchers have investigated who has interest in using a vaginal microbicide. Condoms are highly effective in preventing the transmission of infection, but worldwide, the decision to use condoms is more often a decision made by males than females. A vaginal microbicide which could prevent sexual transmission of infection would further empower women to influence the result of their sexual encounters. The demographic interested in using the produce included women with the following characteristics:

- use condoms to prevent infection
- have previously had a sexually transmitted infection
- have a sexual partner who had another sexual partner in the past year
- minority group
- low income
- unmarried and not cohabiting
- no steady sexual partner

The number of women interested in using such a product has been characterized as being significant enough to merit product development and marketing.

=== Characteristics ===
The ideal vaginal microbicide would have the following characteristics: provide protection against infection not require application at the time of intercourse not harm the natural tissue As of 2009, not harming natural tissue was the most troublesome aspect of development.

== For HIV ==
Studies for using vaginal microbicides for HIV treatment rapidly increased through 2011 to 2013 due mostly to the observation that antiretroviral drugs designed for HIV treatment sometimes also achieve preexposure prophylaxis and significantly reduced HIV risks. Several unrelated chemical mechanisms have been proposed for vaginal microbicides treating HIV. One obstacle to effective research is that trials may involve social harms for trial participants, although one 2019 study found these social harms to be relatively small. There is also often a self-reporting bias in condom and vaginal microbicide use in trials, suggesting the need for vaginal applicator staining to confirm whether the vaginal microbicides were effectively applied.

=== Surfactants ===
The first vaginal microbicide studied was nonoxynol-9, which acted as a surfactant.

=== Blocking HIV binding ===
PRO 2000, carrageenan, and cellulose sulphate have been studied as microbicides to block HIV binding.

=== Topical antiretrovirals ===
Tenofovir has been studied as a topical antiretroviral. One example of a tenofovir study is CAPRISA 004 in 2010, finding its use reduced HIV infection risk by 39% overall.

== See also ==
- Rectal microbicide
- Microbicides for sexually transmitted diseases
