= Salim Abdool Karim =

South African medical researcher

Salim Abdool Karim FRSSAf FRS OMG
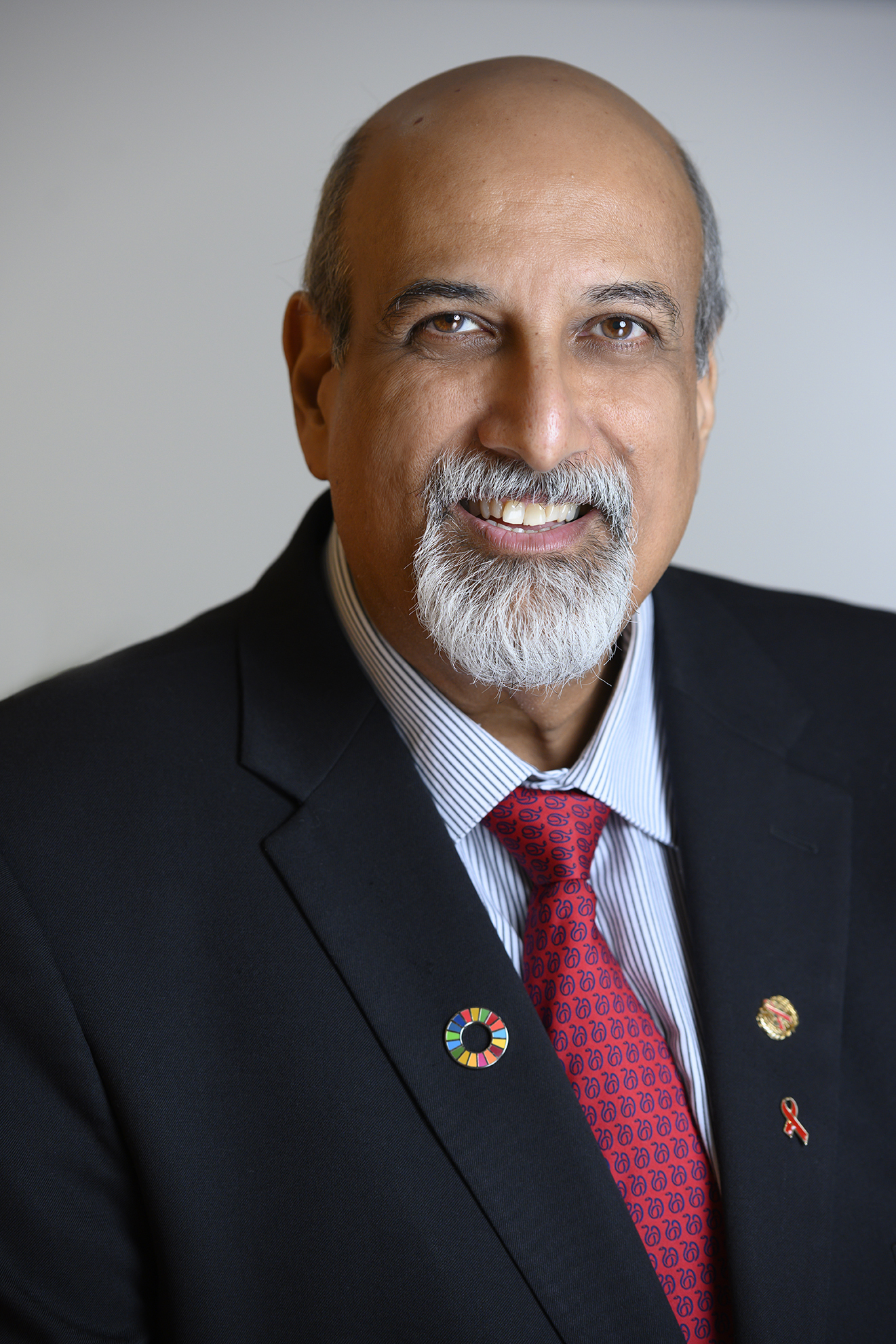
- Born: 29 July 1960 (age 66); Durban, Natal, Union of South Africa
- Education: University of Natal; Columbia University; Colleges of Medicine of South Africa; University of South Africa
- Known for: Scientific and leadership contributions in HIV/AIDS and COVID-19
- Spouse: Quarraisha Abdool Karim
- Children: 3
- Awards: 2023: Honorary Doctorate of Health Sciences, Durban University of Technology; 2022: 4th Hideyo Noguchi Africa Prize, Government of Japan; VinFuture Special Prize, VinFuture Foundation, Vietnam; 2021: University of South Africa Chancellor’s Calabash Award, University of South Africa; Honorary Doctorate: DSc (honoris causa), Rhodes University; CPHIA 2021 Lifetime Achievement in Public Health Award, African Union (AU) and Africa Centres for Disease Control and Prevention; 2020: Canada Gairdner Global Health Award, Gairdner Foundation; John Maddox Prize for Standing up for Science, Sense about Science and Nature; 500 years of the Straits of Magellan Award, Government of Chile; The Sunday Times Top 100 Honorary Award for contributions to the South African COVID-19 response 2018: Al-Sumait Prize for the Advancement of Science, Amir of Kuwait and the Kuwait Foundation; 2017: Lifetime Achievement Award, University of Maryland, Baltimore; 2015: African Union’s Kwame Nkrumah Continental Scientific Award; Platinum Lifetime Achievement Award, Medical Research Council; 2014: Honorary degree - Doctor of Science (Medicine) (honoris causa), University of Cape Town; US Science and Technology Pioneers Prize (to the CAPRISA 004 trial team), the US Agency for International development 2013: John Herschel Medal, Royal Society of South Africa; 2011: Science for Society Gold Medal Award, Academy of Science of South Africa (ASSAf); Olusegun Obasanjo Prize, African Academy of Sciences; 2009: List of TWAS Prize recipients, The World Academy of Sciences (TWAS)
- Scientific career
- Fields: Infectious Diseases
- Workplaces: CAPRISA (CAPRISA) CAPRISA Professor of Global Health, Columbia University, Columbia University Mailman School of Public Health, New York. Fellow of the Royal Society; Member, National Academy of Medicine; Fellow, International Science Council; Fellow, American Society for Microbiology Fellow, The World Academy of Sciences (TWAS)

Salim Safurdeen Abdool Karim FRSSAf FRS OMG is a South African public health physician, epidemiologist and virologist who has played a leading role in the AIDS and COVID-19 pandemic. His scientific contributions have impacted the landscape of HIV prevention and treatment, saving thousands of lives.

== Career ==
Karim is a professor at both the University of KwaZulu-Natal in South Africa, and Columbia University in the United States. He was involved in the study.

During the COVID-19 pandemic, Karim was chosen to lead a 45-person Ministerial Advisory Committee. The committee was intended to guide the South African government's response to the pandemic, and included several other medical experts. He was elected to be the Vice President for Outreach and Engagement of the International Science Council from 2021 to 2024 at the ISC General Assembly on 14 October 2021.

== Education ==
A second-generation South African of Indian heritage, he was born in 1960 in Durban and attended primary school in the Durban city centre before his family was forcibly relocated under apartheid’s racial Group Areas Act from Durban to Chatsworth, a racially segregated township in the south of the city. After completing high school in Durban in 1977, he attended the University of Natal’s medical school. Unable to afford university fees, he had to scrap his original plan to study engineering when he could secure scholarship funding only to study medicine. Despite this setback, he obtained a student loan whilst at medical school to concurrently study computer science and statistics via correspondence at the University of South Africa. Under the mentorship of pediatrician Jerry Coovadia, he conducted his first research project as a third-year medical student, leading to his first publication, a paper in the International Journal of Health Services. This publication highlighted several racial disparities in health status during apartheid.

== Medical training ==
In 1984, he completed his Internship at King Edward VIII Hospital, Durban, followed by an MRC research fellowship. He then joined the Department of Virology at the University of Natal in 1986, to start his doctoral research on Hepatitis B viral infection. He trained in Virology when it was not a recognized medical specialty but was subsequently awarded an Honorary Fellowship in Virology by the College of Medicine of South Africa in recognition of his seminal contributions in this discipline.

In mid-1987, he went to New York on a Rockefeller fellowship to pursue a master's degree in epidemiology at Columbia University. In January 1988, he returned briefly to South Africa to marry Quarraisha Khan, a molecular biologist. During 1988, he also studied health economics at London School of Hygiene & Tropical Medicine and methods of epidemic investigations at the Centers for Disease Control (CDC) in Atlanta, USA. He returned to South Africa at the end of 1988 to contribute through research to addressing the burgeoning HIV epidemic in South Africa. This initiated his life-long collaboration with Quarraisha Abdool Karim, his wife, beginning their first joint study in 1989, which was one of the earliest community-based HIV surveys undertaken in Africa.

In 1992, he started his specialist training in public health, completing his Fellowship in Public Health Medicine with the College of Medicine, South Africa, while simultaneously graduating with a Masters in Medicine degree in Community Health from the University of Natal. In 1999, he obtained a PhD in medicine from the University of Natal, based on his research on the epidemiology of Hepatitis B Virus infection in South Africa.

== Research career ==
In 1985, he spent a year post-internship conducting research at the SAMRC. In 1992, he joined the SAMRC as a senior epidemiologist and was appointed Director of the MRC's Centre for Epidemiological Research in South Africa (CERSA) in 1993. During his tenure, he built CERSA up as the largest medical research organization in South Africa, enabling it to play a leading role in public health, both locally and globally. Almost a decade later, he decided to switch to a leadership position in higher education, taking up the position of Deputy Vice-Chancellor of research at the University of Natal in 2001. Following the post-apartheid merger of the Universities of Natal and Durban Westville in 2004, he developed and implemented a new research strategy for the newly formed University of KwaZulu-Natal with a focus on African scholarship.

Karim is widely recognized for his visionary and bold leadership in conceptualizing and creating research institutions in South Africa. During his tenure at the MRC and the University of KwaZulu-Natal, he created five new successful research centres – building research infrastructure and capacity in South Africa. He was the Principal Investigator of the grants that created the Wellcome Trust-funded Africa Centre for Population Studies and Reproductive Health in 1997, and the MRC's HIV Prevention and Vaccine Research Unit in 2000 with a $16million grant from the National Institutes of Health (NIH). In 2002, he secured a $15 million NIH grant to create the Centre for the AIDS Programme of Research in South Africa (CAPRISA). He led the teams that established LifeLab, a $10 million biotechnology research centre in 2003 and the $70 million KwaZulu-Natal Research Institute for TB and HIV (K-RITH), funded by the Howard Hughes Medical Institute, in 2007. Karim served as the founding director of four of these five research institutes and, in LifeLab, as its founding board chair.

== Key research contributions ==
Karim's main research interests are in HIV prevention, treatment of HIV-TB co-infection, as well as the epidemiology and prevention of COVID-19.

The CAPRISA 004 tenofovir gel trial, which he co-led with Quarraisha Abdool Karim, provided the first evidence for the concept of antiretroviral pre-exposure prophylaxis against HIV infection. In 2012, this finding was heralded by the UNAIDS and WHO as one of the most significant scientific breakthroughs in the fight against AIDS and has been ranked among “The Top 10 Scientific Breakthroughs of 2010” by Science. This study also discovered that tenofovir gel prevents herpes simplex virus type 2 infection in women, which is the first biological prevention agent against genital herpes.

He also led the team that provided the empiric evidence for the “Cycle of HIV Transmission” where young girls are most often infected by men about 10 years older. These findings provided the evidence for the UNAIDS Report “Get on the Fast-Track – The Life-Cycle approach to HIV”, which has influenced the HIV response in several African countries and is listed as the highest priority in the current South African National AIDS Plan.

In the field of HIV vaccines, he is co-inventor on patents that are part of HIV vaccine candidates, as well as CAP256V2LS, a highly potent broadly neutralizing antibody that is being developed for passive immunization as a prelude to future HIV vaccine development.

His research on HIV-TB treatment was adopted in the WHO treatment guidelines of this co-infection and has been implemented in most countries. These significant findings have had a marked impact on HIV prevention and HIV-TB treatment in Africa and globally.

During the COVID-19 pandemic, his most impactful contributions focused on the public health and clinical implications of SARS-CoV-2 variants.

Karim's scientific contributions include over 520 peer-reviewed journal publications. He is co-editor of an Epidemiology textbook (Oxford University Press), a book on HIV/AIDS in South Africa (Cambridge University Press) and a book on HIV Clinical Trials (Springer). He has received grants as Principal Investigator in excess of $200 million, including grants from the NIH, Wellcome Trust, USAID, US CDC and Prevention, European Union, South African Department of Science and Technology and the Howard Hughes Medical Institute.

He is one of the world's most highly cited researchers – being listed from 2018 to 2022 on the Web of Science’s Clarivate Analytics annual list of the world's six thousand most influential researchers by citations in the sciences and social sciences. His most highly cited journal article, jointly first-authored with Quarraisha Abdool Karim (Science 2010; 329: 1168–1174), exceeds 2000 citations.

He has made a significant contribution to scientific capacity building and training as co-principal investigator with Quarraisha Abdool Karim of the Fogarty International Centre funded AIDS-TB training programme for a decade. More than 600 researchers from several countries in southern Africa have been trained in AIDS and TB research through this programme.

== Affiliations ==
He is director and Yusuf Hamied Chair in Global Health of the Centre for the AIDS Programme of Research in South Africa (CAPRISA) and CAPRISA Professor of Global Health in Epidemiology at the Mailman School of Public Health at Columbia University. He is also Pro Vice-Chancellor (Research) at the University of KwaZulu-Natal, South Africa, Adjunct Professor of Immunology and Infectious Diseases at Harvard University, Boston and adjunct professor of medicine at the Weill Cornell Medicine of Cornell University, New York.

As Director of CAPRISA, he is also the Director of 4 research centres hosted within CAPRISA. He is the Director of the UNAIDS Collaborating Centre for HIV Research and Policy, the Centre of Excellence in HIV Prevention of the South African National Research Foundation, a Centre of Excellence of the Global Virus Network and a South African Medical Research Council (SAMRC) extramural research unit for HIV-TB Pathogenesis and Treatment.

During his tenure as President of the SAMRC from 2012 to 2014, he led the turnaround of an 800-person organization in serious decline by redefining its strategic mission, enhancing organizational efficiencies, increasing its budget three-fold and raising its research impact and international stature. The February 2014 issue of Nature Medicine acknowledged and described how he turned a “moribund” MRC around with “visionary leadership”.

== Scientific advice and policy contributions ==
Karim has made major contributions to AIDS and COVID-19 policies, both in Africa and globally. He has provided scientific advice in AIDS, COVID-19 and global health to several governments as well as international agencies such as the WHO, ISC, UNAIDS, PEPFAR and the Global Fund to fight AIDS, TB and Malaria. He is on the 9-member WHO Science Council, that provides scientific advice to the WHO Director-General. He was the Chair of the UNAIDS Scientific Expert Panel, that provided scientific advice to the executive director of UNAIDS. He served as a member of the UNAIDS-Lancet Commission on “Defeating AIDS”, co-authoring its 2015 report in the Lancet, that mapped out a future direction for the global AIDS response. He is currently a member of the Scientific Advisory Board for Global Health at the Bill and Melinda Gates Foundation and a member of the WHO HIV-TB Task Force. More recently, he has been contributing to COVID-19 policies and served as the Chair of the South African Ministerial Advisory Committee on COVID-19 and as a Member of the Africa Task Force for Coronavirus, The Africa Task Force on COVID-19 and the Lancet Commission on COVID-19.

He has previously served as a Member of the PEPFAR Scientific Advisory Board, the Gates Foundation's Global HIV Prevention Working Group and the WHO Expert Advisory Panel on Sexually Transmitted Infections. He was the Chair of the Scientific and Technical Advisory Group of the WHO's Department of Reproductive Health and Research as well as for its HIV and STI Department. In 1996, he was elected to the Governing Council of the International Epidemiological Association, where he served a 3-year term. He is currently a Vice President of the International Science Council.

== Scientific recognition ==
Karim is an elected Fellow of the Royal Society. He is an elected Member of the National Academy of Medicine. He is a Fellow of the International Science Council. In addition, he is a Member / Fellow of the American Society for Microbiology, Association of American Physicians (AAP), The World Academy of Sciences (TWAS), African Academy of Sciences (AAS), Academy of Science in South Africa (ASSAf) and the Royal Society of South Africa (RSSAf).

He is a member of the editorial board of The New England Journal of Medicine. He serves on the International Advisory Boards of Lancet HIV and The Lancet - Global Health. He also previously served as a member of the Board of Reviewing Editors of eLife, Associate Editor for AIDS Clinical Care and Corresponding Editor for the International Journal of Infectious Diseases. He has served as a Reviewer for more than 40 scientific journals.

He has chaired and organized several AIDS conferences, most prominently as Chairperson of the Scientific Program Committee for the 2000 Durban XIII^{th} International AIDS Conference that redefined the global AIDS response and led to antiretrovirals becoming affordable. He is frequently invited to deliver plenary addresses at major international conferences, including talks at the International AIDS Conference (including the Opening Plenary in the 2014 International AIDS Conference in Melbourne, Australia), the International AIDS Vaccine Conference, International Microbicides Conference and the International Society for Infectious Diseases Conference.

== Prizes and awards ==
His contributions in AIDS have been recognized nationally and internationally through several prestigious awards. He received the most prestigious scientific award in Africa - the African Union Kwame Nkrumah Award for Scientific Excellence. His other international awards include Japan's Hideyo Noguchi Africa Prize for medical research, Kuwait's “Al-Sumait Prize” for research contributing to African development, Canada's John Dirks Gairdner Health Award, Vietnam's VinFuture Special Prize, Chile's 500 years of the Straits of Magellan Award and the African Union – Africa CDC's CPHIA Lifetime Achievement in Public Health Award. In 2020, he received, jointly with Dr A Fauci, the John Maddox Prize for Standing up for Science from Sense about Science and Nature.

He received a Lifetime Achievement Award from the Institute of Human Virology, the DIA - Drug Information Association's “President's Award for Outstanding Achievement in World Health”, the African Academy of Science's “Olusegun Obasanjo Prize for Scientific Discovery and Technological Innovation”, Columbia University’s “Allan Rosenfield Alumni Award”, the “Outstanding Senior African Scientist Award” from the European Union – Developing Countries Partnership, and the “TWAS Prize in Medical Sciences” from TWAS. He has also been awarded the “Distinguished Scholar Award” from the Biomedical HIV Prevention Forum of Nigeria, and the USAID “Science and Technology Pioneers Prize” (awarded to the CAPRISA 004 team) from US Agency for International Development.

He has also been recognized for his broader contributions to society beyond his research through the “Hero in Medicine” Award from the International Association of Physicians for AIDS Care (IAPAC) and the “Men’s Health Award” in the Science & Technology category from Men's Health magazine.

He has received Honorary Doctorates from the University of Cape Town and Rhodes University. He received the UNISA Chancellor's Calabash Award from the University of South Africa and Honorary Fellowship of the Mangosuthu University of Technology in South Africa.

In South Africa, he has received the MRC's “Platinum Medal Lifetime Achievement Award”, “Gold Medal Award for Fellowship in the Art & Science of Medicine” from the South African Medical Association, the “John F. W. Herschel Medal” from the Royal Society of South Africa and the “Science for Society Gold Medal Award” from the Academy of Science in South Africa. He has been ranked as being among the 50 all-time “Legends of South African Science” by the Academy of Science of South Africa.

In 2024, Karim was co-recipient of the 2024 Lasker~Bloomberg Public Service Award, together with Quarraisha Abdool Karim.

In 2024, Karim was awarded The Royal Society Michael Faraday Prize and Lecture for his scientific leadership, policy advice, epidemiological analyses, and articulate public education.

In May 2026, Karim was bestowed the National Order of Mapungubwe by the South African Government for his contributions to contribution to medical science and public health.

== Anti-apartheid, anti-corruption and human rights activism ==
In 1980, he joined the anti-apartheid movement, initially as a student activist. He played a key role in creating and publishing a community newspaper, called “Ukusa”, that rallied support against the atrocities of racial oppression.

As an anti-apartheid activist and community organizer, he participated in the 1983 Mitchells Plain, Cape Town launch of the United Democratic Front, a turning point in the struggle against apartheid through a new broad-based non-racial liberation movement.

Shortly after graduating as a medical doctor in 1983, he played a key role in creating and building an anti-apartheid organization for doctors and dentists, known as NAMDA – National Medical and Dental Association – that fought against racial and gender disparities in health. In 1988, he received the “Reebok Human Rights Award” for his contributions in NAMDA to health and human rights.

During the difficult years of AIDS denial in South Africa, he openly challenged Minister of Health Tshabalala-Msimang and President Thabo Mbeki and went further to secure antiretroviral drugs and funding to create one of the largest AIDS treatment programmes at a time when antiretroviral treatment was against government policy.

He has campaigned vigorously against corruption and human rights abuses; taking a strong principled stance against corruption in South Africa. In front-page newspaper articles, he called on the country's National Director of Public Prosecutions to step down for his failure to act against corruption. During the COVID-19 lockdown, he took a strong stand against the abuses perpetrated by the South African military and against the corruption involved in the purchase of personal protective equipment during the early stages of the pandemic.

He currently serves on the Advisory Council of Physicians for Human Rights, the New York-based organization on health and human rights. He serves on the advisory board of “Defend our Democracy”, a South African organization fighting corruption and promoting good governance.

== Personal life ==
Karim is a father and is married to Quarraisha Abdool Karim whom he has worked with in research.

Educational offices
Preceded by vacant	President of the South African Medical Research Council; 2012 – 2014	Succeeded by Glenda Gray
