= Sheila Lukehart =

American physician and academic

Sheila Ann Lukehart
- Born: Belleville, Illinois
- Education: Revelle College; University of California, Los Angeles
- Scientific career
- Workplaces: University of California, San Diego
- Thesis: Studies on immunity in experimental syphilis (1978)

Sheila Lukehart is an American physician who is Emeritus Professor of Medicine at the University of Washington. Her research covered immune responses and the pathogenesis of syphilis. In 2023, she was elected a Fellow of the American Society for Microbiology.

== Early life and education ==
Lukehart was born in Belleville, Illinois. She moved frequently as a child, and attended fifteen schools before ninth grade. She completed high school and college in Southern California. Lukehard studied biology at Revelle College in the University of California, San Diego, here she was first introduced to microbiology, and focused on Bacillus subtilis. She stayed in California for doctoral research, earning a PhD in microbiology at University of California, Los Angeles. Her doctoral research introduced her to Treponema pallidum and syphilis, which would fascinate her throughout her career. She returned to the University of California, San Diego as a postdoctoral fellow.

== Research and career ==
Lukehart joined the laboratory of King K. Holmes at the University of Washington in 1980, where she worked on sexually-transmitted diseases. In 2003, Lukehart was made Assistant Dean for Research at the School of Medicine. She dedicated her career to understanding syphilis. This included studies into how the central nervous system was involved with syphilis infection and the molecular mechanisms that underpinned the action of Treponema pallidum, the bacterium that causes syphilis.

Lukehart's early work defined the mechanisms responsible for clearing Treponema pallidum during the early stages of syphilis. Treponema pallidum is a complicated bacterium to grow; it is propagated by passage in rabbits and it has a very fragile surface structure. Lukehart identified that there was variation in the surface antigen of Treponema pallidum that could explain how it evades immune response and caused clinical infection. She studied the development of macrolide resistance in strains of Treponema pallidum, and showed that the bacterium frequently invaded the central nervous system in the early days of HIV.

Lukehart is a longstanding advocate for women scientists. She served on the national governing board of the Association for Women in Science, and founded the Seattle chapter. She retired from the University of Washington in 2020.

== Awards and honors ==
- 2007 American Sexually Transmitted Diseases Association Distinguished Career Award
- 2023 Elected Fellow of the American Academy of Microbiology

== Selected publications ==
- S A Lukehart; E W Hook; S A Baker-Zander; A C Collier; C W Critchlow; H H Handsfield (1 December 1988). "Invasion of the central nervous system by Treponema pallidum: implications for diagnosis and treatment". Annals of Internal Medicine. 109 (11): 855–862. doi:10.7326/0003-4819-109-11-855. ISSN 0003-4819. PMID 3056164. Wikidata Q70225612.
- Rebecca E Lafond; Sheila A Lukehart (1 January 2006). "Biological basis for syphilis". Clinical Microbiology Reviews. 19 (1): 29–49. doi:10.1128/cmr.19.1.29-49.2006. ISSN 0893-8512. PMC 1360276. PMID 16418521. Wikidata Q34334047.
- Christina M Marra; Clare L Maxwell; Stacy L Smith; et al. (27 January 2004). "Cerebrospinal fluid abnormalities in patients with syphilis: association with clinical and laboratory features". The Journal of Infectious Diseases. 189 (3): 369–376. doi:10.1086/381227. ISSN 0022-1899. PMID 14745693. Wikidata Q75340485.
