= Michael Meyer-Hermann =

Michael Meyer-Hermann (born 1967 in Reinbek) is a professor at the Technical University of Braunschweig and head of the department of Systems Immunology at the Helmholtz Centre for Infection Research.

== Career ==
Meyer-Hermann studied Physics, Mathematics and Philosophy in Frankfurt and Paris. His diploma thesis titled "QCD-Summenregeln mit Massen" about Quantum chromodynamics was published in 1993. In 1997, he finished his doctorate in theoretical Particle Physics at the Goethe University Frankfurt. He founded the research group "Theoretical Biophysics" at the Technical University Dresden in 1998 which he headed until 2003. He worked at the University of Oxford during 2004. From 2005 to 2010, he had the role of a Fellow at the Frankfurt Institute for Advanced Studies (FIAS). Since 2010, he is a professor at the Technical University of Braunschweig and head of the department of Systems Immunology at the Helmholtz Centre for Infection Research.

In his group, he develops methods for theoretical cell biology for an improved understanding of functionality in the adaptive immune system and the interplay between the nervous, endocrine, and Immune system. This includes research about T cells and B cells, viral and bacterial diseases, metabolic disorders, diabetes, and cancer. He employs mathematical methods for modeling medical and biological systems. The methods range from ordinary as well as partial differential equations and agent-based models to algorithms from adaptive control and artificial intelligence.

In the context of the COVID-19 pandemic in Germany, a model based on an extended SEIR model was developed in his group that received broad public attention. In the following weeks, regularly updated estimates of the reproductive number in the different German federal states were published. In April 2020, Meyer-Hermann argued from an epidemiological point of view against loosening of restrictions concerning social distancing, curfews and other measures in interviews and Anne Will (talk show) to keep the reproduction number substantially below 1 and contain the pandemic. In an interdisciplinary study together with Clemens Fuest (ifo Institute for Economic Research) ge postulated that a reproduction number around 0.75 would be optimal from an economic point of view without compromising public health goals, stating that there was no conflict between economic and public health interests regarding substantial loosening of restrictions.

== Selected publications ==
- Gabriel D. Victora, Tanja A. Schwickert, David R. Fooksman, Alice O. Kamphorst, Michael Meyer-Hermann, Michael L. Dustin, Michel C. Nussenzweig: Germinal center dynamics revealed by multiphoton microscopy with a photoactivatable fluorescent reporter. In: Cell 143(4), 2010, S. 592–605, doi:10.1016/j.cell.2010.10.032.
- Gernot Schaller, Michael Meyer-Hermann: Multicellular tumor spheroid in an off-lattice Voronoi-Delaunay cell model. In: Physical Review E 71(5), 2005, 051910, doi:10.1103/PhysRevE.71.051910.
- Jeroen M. J. Tas, Luka Mesin, Giulia Pasqual, Sasha Targ, Johanne T Jacobsen, Yasuko M Mano, Casie S Chen, Jean-Claude Weill, Claude-Agnès Reynaud, Edward P Browne, Michael Meyer-Hermann, Gabriel D Victora: Visualizing antibody affinity maturation in germinal centers. In: Science 351(6277), 2016, S. 1048–1054, doi:10.1126/science.aad3439.
- Yang Zhang, Michael Meyer-Hermann, Laura A. George, Marc Thilo Figge, Mahmood Khan, Margaret Goodall, Stephen P. Young, Adam Reynolds, Francesco Falciani, Ari Waisman, Clare A. Notley, Michael R. Ehrenstein, Marie Kosco-Vilbois, Kai-Michael Toellner: Germinal center B cells govern their own fate via antibody feedback. In: Journal of Experimental Medicine 210(3), 2013, S. 457–464, doi:10.1084/jem.20120150.
