= International Rectal Microbicide Advocates =

International Rectal Microbicide Advocates (IRMA) is an international non-profit organization which promotes awareness of rectal microbicides.

== History ==
The International Rectal Microbicide Advocates was formed in 2005 through a collaboration between the Canadian AIDS Society, the AIDS Foundation of Chicago, and the Community HIV/AIDS Mobilization Project (which disbanded in 2011). No other advocacy group existed – or currently exists – whose focus is on rectal microbicide research and development.

== Activities ==
IRMA has reviewed and encouraged research into the safety of personal lubricants for anal sex. In an effort to raise awareness and advocacy for lubricants, IRMA issued the Global Lube Access Mobilisation (GLAM) Toolkit to help activists better engage with organizations and governments on the necessity of lubricant safety and access.
