= Madhukar Pai =

Indian health academic

- Born: Vellore, India
- Education: Stanley Medical College; MGR Medical University; Christian Medical College; University of California, Berkeley; University of California, San Francisco
- Known for: Tuberculosis and public health research, equity advocacy
- Awards: Chanchlani Global Health Research Award; Union Scientific Prize; Haile T. Debas Prize; David Johnston Faculty & Staff Award

Madhukar Pai (also known as Madhu Pai) is a Canadian medical doctor, academic, advocate, writer, and university professor. He is the Associate Director of the McGill International Tuberculosis Centre. Pai's work focuses on global health, specifically advocacy for better treatment for tuberculosis with a focus on South Africa and India. Pai is the inaugural Chair of the Department of Global and Public Health in the School of Population and Global Health and holds a Canada Research Chair in Epidemiology and Global Health at McGill University. He is recognised globally, and is a key leader in the decolonising global health movement - recognised for his advocacy on making global health more diverse, inclusive, and equitable.

== Education ==
Pai completed medical training and his community medicine residency at the Christian Medical College Vellore, India. He received his Ph.D. in epidemiology from University of California, Berkeley. He also did a postdoctoral fellowship at the University of California San Francisco.

== Committees and editorial boards ==
Pai serves on the Scientific Advisory Committee of FIND (the global alliance for diagnostics) and is on the World Health Organization's Strategic Advisory Group of Experts on In Vitro Diagnostics and the Access Advisory Committee of TB Alliance. He is the Chair of the Public-Private Mix Working Group of the Stop TB Partnership. Pai is also on the editorial boards of BMJ Global Health, PLoS Medicine, Lancet Infectious Diseases, and is an Editor-in-Chief of PLOS Global Public Health.

== Advocacy ==
Pai is a frequent media commentator on the COVID-19 pandemic in India, and in 2021 drew comparisons of the collective global action taken in response to the COVID19 pandemic versus the relative inaction towards tuberculosis. His 2021 paper in PLOS Medicine addressed power asymmetries in global health.

In 2020 and in 2021 he published papers and contributions about the decolonisation of global health work. His called to address racism and colonialism in Global Health at the AIDS 2022 conference.

In 2021, Pai was critical of the global failure to widely vaccinate people against COVID-19, accused high-income nations of vaccine hoarding, and called for a waiver of intellectual property laws regarding COVID19 vaccines. In 2022 he described the global response to COVID-19 as an "unmitigated disaster".

== Awards ==
- Listed in the 50 Scientists that Inspire in 2024 by the Cell Press
- Dr PRJ Gangadharam Endowment Award in 2023
- Chanchlani Global Health Research Award 2012
- Union Scientific Prize
- Haile T. Debas Prize
- David Johnston Faculty & Staff Award

== Selected publications ==
- Madhukar Pai; Alice Zwerling; Dick Menzies (5 August 2008). "Systematic review: T-cell-based assays for the diagnosis of latent tuberculosis infection: an update". Annals of Internal Medicine. 149 (3): 177–184. doi:10.7326/0003-4819-149-3-200808050-00241. ISSN 0003-4819. PMC 2951987. PMID 18593687. Wikidata Q22241138.
- Jennifer Furin; Helen Cox; Madhukar Pai (20 March 2019). "Tuberculosis". The Lancet. 393 (10181): 1642–1656. doi:10.1016/s0140-6736(19)30308-3. ISSN 0140-6736. PMID 30904262. Wikidata Q92572130.
- Khan, Themrise; Abimbola, Seye; Kyobutungi, Catherine; Pai, Madhukar (1 June 2022). "How we classify countries and people—and why it matters". BMJ Global Health. 7 (6) e009704. doi:10.1136/bmjgh-2022-009704. ISSN 2059-7908. PMC 9185389. PMID 35672117.
