= Vikram Patel =

Indian psychiatrist and researcher

Vikram Patel FMedSci
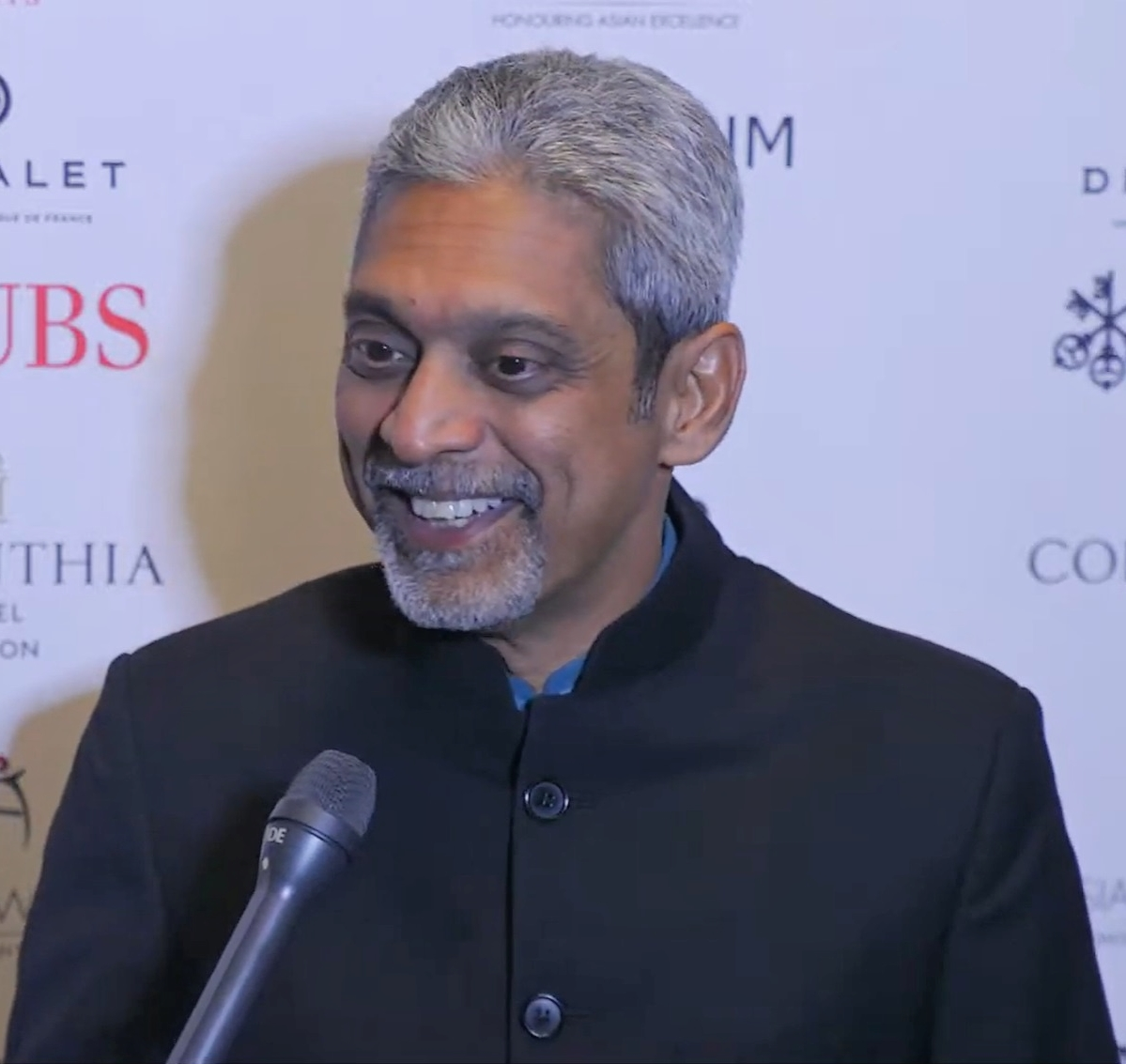
- Patel at The Asian Awards in 2016
- Born: Vikram Harshad Patel; 5 May 1964 (age 62); Mumbai, India
- Education: University of Mumbai (MB BS); University of Oxford (MSc); University of London (PhD)
- Known for: Sangath
- Awards: Wellcome Trust Principal Research Fellow (2005); FMedSci (2009)
- Scientific career
- Fields: Mental health
- Workplaces: Harvard Medical School; London School of Hygiene & Tropical Medicine
- Thesis: Common mental disorders in Harare: : A study in the "new" cross-cultural psychiatry (1997)
- Website: Vikram Patel - Harvard

Vikram Harshad Patel (born 5 May 1964) is an Indian psychiatrist and researcher best known for his work on child development and mental disability in low-resource settings. He is the Co-Founder and former Director of the Centre for Global Mental Health at the London School of Hygiene and Tropical Medicine (LSHTM), Co-Director of the Centre for Control of Chronic Conditions at the Public Health Foundation of India, and the Co-Founder of Sangath, an Indian NGO dedicated to research in the areas of child development, adolescent health and mental health. Since 2024, he has been the Paul Farmer Professor and Chair of the Department of Global Health and Social Medicine at Harvard Medical School in Boston, where he was previously the Pershing Square Professor of Global Health and Social Medicine. He is the Head of the Department of Global Health and Social Medicine at Harvard Medical School and also a Professor in the Department of Global Health and Population at the Harvard T.H. Chan School of Public Health. He was awarded a Wellcome Trust Principal Research Fellowship in 2015. In April 2015, he was listed as one of the world's 100 most influential people by TIME magazine.

== Education ==
Patel was educated at the University of Mumbai, (Bachelor of Medicine, Bachelor of Surgery, 1987) the University of Oxford (Master of Science, 1989) and the University of London where he was awarded a PhD in 1997 for research on mental disorders in Harare.

== Career ==
Patel's work spans a variety of topics and disciplines including epidemiology, medicine, psychology, disability, neurological disease, Non-communicable diseases, public health, substance abuse, economic evaluation, and implementation research. His primary interest, however, is in global mental health, specifically the improved treatment and care of people with mental disorders around the globe. His work has been financially supported by the London-based biomedical research charity The Wellcome Trust since 1996 where he has served as Senior Research Fellow in Clinical Science since 2005.

He currently serves on four Government of India committees: the Mental Health Policy Group (which drafted India's first national mental health policy, launched on 10 October 2014); the National Rural Health Mission ASHA Mentoring Group; the National Human Rights Commission Core Committee on Health; and the Technical Advisory Group of the Rashtriya Kishor Swasthya Karyakram. He was Founding and Joint Director of the Centre for Global Mental Health, a partner of the LSHTM with Kings Health Partners, until handing over the role to Professor Ricardo Araya in October 2014. He is currently Joint Director of the Centre for Chronic Conditions and Injuries at the Public Health Foundation of India located in New Delhi. He serves on three WHO Committees, which include: Mental Health; Maternal, Child and Adolescent Health; and EMRO Mental Health. And he served as co-chair of the Scientific Advisory Board of the Grand Challenges in Global Mental Health of the National Institute for Mental Health.

In 1997, he and several local colleagues founded Sangath, a mental health research NGO located in Goa, that works with the LSHTM on projects focusing on child development, adolescent health, and mental health. In 2008, Sangath won the MacArthur Foundation's International Prize for Creative and Effective Institutions and is using the grant money on ways in which task-sharing in mental health care can be properly distributed between primary care professionals and community based workers. Sangath is now ranked amongst India's leading public health research institutions.

Patel has also served as editor for several major medical publications including the influential Lancet series on global mental health in 2007 and 2011 (as well as universal health care in India again in 2011), the PLoS Medicine series on packages of care for mental disorders in 2009, and the series on Global Mental Health Practices in 2012 and onwards. He was also editor of the International Journal of Epidemiology series on global mental health and psychiatric epidemiology in 2014. He is the editor of two Oxford University Press textbooks on global mental health, Global Mental Health: Principles and Practice and Global Mental Health Trials.

In 2007, he played a role in setting up the new Movement for Global Mental Health, a global coalition of professionals and civilian volunteers working together to assist those affected by mental illness, by helping to promote as editor the 2011 Lancet series' Call to Action. The movement has grown to over 10,000 people working with over 200 institutions around the world.

In 2003, he wrote the book Where There Is No Psychiatrist, a mental health care manual primarily used in developing countries by non-specialist health workers and volunteers. It has been translated into fifteen languages.

Patel is based in Boston, New Delhi, and Goa.

=== Teaching ===
Patel has spent much of his career in trying to educate people on the nature and importance of global mental health. In 2012, he played an integral role in the establishment of Sangath's Masters in Global Mental Health program, which is jointly run with the Institute of Psychiatry, London. He is the chair for the Exam Board of the same program and has helped to design and teach many of the core modules within the program. One week out of the year, he teaches an intensive Short Course on Research Methods in Global Mental Health in London to aspiring global health workers; this program is also jointly run with the Institute of Psychiatry, London.

He also coordinates short courses on Leadership in Mental Health with Sangath in India.

Aside from academic teaching, he has given over a dozen auditorium speeches, including a global conference in 2012 in association with TED. Patel's philosophy towards global mental health and its potential treatments is summarised in the following quote from his 2012 TED talk introduction:

Nearly 450 million people are affected by mental illness worldwide. In wealthy nations, just half receive appropriate care, but in developing countries, close to 90 percent go untreated because psychiatrists are in such short supply. Vikram Patel outlines a highly promising approach — training members of communities to give mental health interventions, empowering ordinary people to care for others.

=== Research ===
Patel has published over 250 peer reviewed scientific articles. The main focus of his research has been on epidemiology and the sociocultural determinants and treatment of mental disorders in impoverished regions of India and other resource poor settings. Examples of his major research contributions include: the burden of mental disorders and suicide in young people; the association of poverty and gender based violence with depression and suicide; the relationship of mental disorders with other health priorities such as gynecological morbidities, adolescent health, HIV/AIDS and maternal and child health; and the development and evaluation of interventions for mental disorders integrated in routine care settings including in schools and primary health care. He has recently become increasingly involved in researching mental disorders and developmental disabilities in children, seeking to integrate mental health care with more pervasive forms of health care treatments, such as those involving chronic illnesses.

=== Awards and honours ===
Patel was won numerous awards including:

- 2009: Awarded the Chalmers Medal by the Royal Society of Tropical Medicine and Hygiene (UK).
- 2009: Elected a Fellow of the Academy of Medical Sciences (FMedSci)
- 2014: Awarded the Sarnat Prize in mental health by the Institute of Medicine (USA).
- 2015: Awarded a Wellcome Trust Principal Research Fellowship in Clinical Science (UK).
- 2015: Awarded an Honorary Doctorate from Georgetown University.
- 2015: Listed in TIME 100 most influential people of the world.
- 2016: Awarded Chanchlani Global Health Research Award
- 2019: Awarded Canada Gairdner Global Health Award
