= Canada Gairdner Global Health Award =

The John Dirks Canada Gairdner Global Health Award is given by the Gairdner Foundation to recognize scientists who have made achievements in 'global health research'.

== Previous winners ==
- 2009: Nubia Muñoz
- 2010: Nicholas J. White
- 2011: Robert Edward Black
- 2012: Brian M. Greenwood
- 2013: King K. Holmes
- 2014: Satoshi Ōmura, 2015 Nobel Prize in Physiology or Medicine winner.
- 2015: Peter Piot
- 2016: Anthony Fauci
- 2017: Cesar Victora
- 2018: Alan Lopez, Christopher J.L. Murray
- 2019: Vikram Patel
- 2020: Salim S. Abdool Karim, Quarraisha Abdool Karim
- 2021: Yi Guan, Joseph Sriyal Malik Peiris
- 2022: Zulfiqar Bhutta
- 2023: José Belizán
- 2024: Gagandeep Kang
- 2025: André Briend
- 2026: John D. Clemens, Jan Holmgren

== See also ==
- Gairdner Foundation International Award
- Gairdner Foundation Wightman Award
- Gairdner Foundation
