= CAPRISA 004 =

HIV prevention clinical trial

CAPRISA 004 was a clinical trial conducted by Centre for the AIDS Programme of Research in South Africa (CAPRISA). This particular study was the first to show that a topical gel could reduce a person's risk of contracting HIV. The gel used in the study contained a microbicide.

== Background ==
A previous study had measured the safety and tolerability of tenofovir in both sexually active and abstinent women. This study gave support to the idea that tenofovir was a drug which was worth examining as an HIV preventative.

== Study design ==
CAPRISA 004 was a phase IIb, double-blind, randomized, placebo-controlled study comparing 1% tenofovir gel with a placebo gel. 900 young women who were judged to be at risk of contracting HIV volunteered to use a study gel in their vaginas, with half of those receiving the microbicide gel and the other half getting the placebo (according to their randomization results). The study asked participants to apply a first dose of the gel within 12 hours before having sex and to apply another dose within 12 hours after sex. All study volunteers participated in HIV risk reduction counseling and received condoms. The study assisted in arranging treatment for any sexually transmitted infections that participants contracted.

The study began in May 2007, was completed in December 2009, and the data collected was published in March 2010. The study design had expected the study to last for 30 months, with about 14 months to recruit study volunteers then with follow-up until 92 participants were observed to have become infected with HIV. The entrance criteria were such that, based on risk factors in the participants' lifestyles, the study expected 92 infections to occur approximately 16 months after they recruited the final volunteer.

== Results ==
Researchers led by Quarraisha Karim found that a microbicide containing 1% tenofovir was, for women participating in the trial, 39% effective in reducing risk of contracting HIV during sex and 51% effective in preventing genital herpes infections.

== Responses ==
The results of CAPRISA 004 were formally released at the 18th International AIDS Conference.

Michel Sidibé of UNAIDS described the results of the study as being very encouraging because the treatment "can be controlled by women, and put in 12 hours earlier, and that is empowering. They do not have to ask the man for permission to use it. And the cost of the gel is not high."

Anthony Fauci of NIAID stated that "This is the first study that has shown a clear-cut positive effect of a microbicide on blocking acquisition of HIV infection."

Mitchell Warren, head of the AIDS Vaccine Advocacy Coalition, remarked that "This is a really historic day for HIV prevention research. For the first time, through the CAPRISA 004 trial, we have seen evidence in a human clinical trial that a microbicide can help to prevent sexual transmission."

A Phase III study named "FACTS 001", a larger study involving 2,200 women in Africa which is expected to start around the end of July 2011 and last 24 months.

== Research partnerships ==
CAPRISA conducted CAPRISA 004 with the following assistance:

- the United States Agency for International Development (USAID) provided funding
- the Technology Innovation Agency (TIA), a biotechnology agency of the South African government's Department of Science and Technology, provided funding
- Gilead Sciences provided tenofovir for the gel used in the study
- Family Health International provided technical assistance such as clinical trial protocol development, clinical monitoring, and clinical study design
- CONRAD provided consulting related to microbicides

The principal investigators for the study were Salim Abdool Karim and Quarraisha Abdool Karim, both of the University of KwaZulu-Natal. The study was conducted at the eThekwini Clinical Research Site in Durban, South Africa and the Vulindlela Clinical Research Site in Pietermaritzburg, South Africa.
