= Lumkani =

South African social enterprise

- Named after: Xhosa word meaning "be careful"
- Formation: 2014; 12 years ago
- Founder: Francois Petousis
- Founded at: University of Cape Town, South Africa
- Products: Heat detectors/fire prevention
- Website: lumkani.com

Lumkani is a South African social enterprise and financial service provider established in 2015, dedicated to increasing the resilience of urban informal settlement dwellers by reducing the risk of fire through a rise-of-heat networked fire detector system. Lumkani offers this early warning fire detection system alongside a microinsurance product tailored for low-income households in climate-vulnerable, high-fire-risk areas. Lumkani's mission is to foster safety and resilience for underserved communities by providing risk reduction technology.

== Background ==
The technology that formed the basis for the early fire warning detection system was initially a university project by Francois Petousis, an electrical engineering student at the University of Cape Town. In 2015, Lumkani was co-founded by Petousis alongside Paul Mesarcik, Emily Vining, Max Basler and David Glukman. The name of the startup has its origins in the local isiXhosa language, meaning “be careful”.

Lumkani was the first formal organisation established to address the fire safety hazards faced by informal urban settlements in Cape Town. The hardware technology was combined with the offering of financial services in 2017, with Hollard underwriting the microinsurance product. Lumkani and Hollard also provide financial education, community-based risk awareness, and disaster preparedness support. Lumkani and Hollard have been highly lauded for the ways in which they consider and measure the social impact of their product.

Since its initial installation in Cape Town in November 2014, Lumkani has installed over 60,000 early fire warning detection systems in informal settlements across South Africa, Kenya, and Bangladesh.

== The Technology ==
In collaboration with Johnson Controls International, Lumkani developed an advanced rate-of-rise heat detector specifically engineered to identify the early stages of a fire in informal homes. The device is a small blue box that measures the rate of temperature rise rather than detecting smoke which helps in reducing false alarms because homes in informal settlements often use heat sources that smoke for cooking, heating and lighting. The system employs a patented Internet of Things (IoT) mesh network to facilitate community-wide alerts during fire incidents. If an alarm is not disarmed within 30 seconds, a 95 dB alarm will activate, simultaneously triggering alarms in all houses within a 60-meter radius. Solar-powered gateways record fire events in a centralised database, enabling comprehensive oversight and analysis, while sending instant SMS alerts to homeowners. It also locates the GPS coordinates of the blaze, able to coordinate with the fire department. A third-party study conducted in 2018 found that the device helped “limit the spread of 94% of fires”.

== Recognition & funding ==
In 2014, the startup received funding from South Africa’s Technology Innovation Agency (TIA).

In the same year, the startup won Global Innovation through Science and Technology competition’s Best Start-up award.

In 2015, the startup’s device was a finalist in the Katherine M. Swanson Young Innovator Award. In the same year, Lumkani won the People’s Choice Award at Global Social Venture Competition as well as the South African version of the Chivas Regal's The Venture competition.

In 2020, Lumkani won the EIC Horizon Prize for Affordable High-Tech on Humanitarian Aid, at EU Research & Innovation Days.
