= Gairdner Foundation =

The Gairdner Foundation is a Canadian non-profit organization dedicated to recognizing and celebrating international excellence in biomedical research and global health. From its establishment in 1957, 102 Gairdner Foundation Award winners have also won Nobel Prizes in science or medicine.

== History ==
The Gairdner Foundation was created in 1957 by philanthropist James Arthur Gairdner (1893–1971). He created the awards originally to recognize researchers in the field of arthritic, rheumatic, and cardio vascular diseases, but soon expanded the criteria to include "individuals who have made contributions in the conquest of disease and the relief of human suffering." Out of the 256 winners between 1957 and 2000, 54 went on to win Nobel Prizes in science or medicine. By 2024, this number had increased to 102.

The Gairdner Foundation's 15-member Board of Directors comprises individuals with expertise from the academic, private, and public sectors.

== Awards ==
The Gairdner Foundation annually awards three types of Canada Gairdner Awards to scientists at various stages of their careers. The Canada Gairdner Awards are supported by funding through the governments of Canada, Alberta, Quebec and Ontario. In February 2008, the Government of Canada announced a $20 million allocation to the Gairdner Foundation to increase the prizes to $100,000 each, and institute a new individual prize in global health. Commencing in 2009, the Awards have been renamed the Canada Gairdner International Awards. In March 2025, the Government of Canada committed $10 million for the Canada Gairdner Awards to increase the value of the Canada Gairdner International Award from $100,000 to $250,000.

Five Canada Gairdner International Awards are awarded annually to "outstanding researchers whose unique scientific contributions have increased the understanding of human biology and disease."

One John Dirks Canada Gairdner Global Health Award is awarded annually to "researchers who have used rational, scientifically based research to improve the wellbeing of those facing health inequalities worldwide."

Two Peter Gilgan Canada Gairdner Momentum Awards are awarded annually to mid-career investigators working in Canada who have "produced exceptional scientific research contributions with continued potential for impact on human health."

The most recent Canada Gairdner awardees, along with awardees from years past, visit universities across Canada to provide academic lectures on their various areas of expertise.
