= PRO 2000 =

Chemical compound

Clinical data
- Other names: 2-Naphthalenesulfonic acid, sodium salt, polymer with formaldehyde

Identifiers
- IUPAC name: Sodium 2-naphthalenesulfonate, polymer with formaldehyde
- CAS Number: 29321-75-3
- ChemSpider: none
- NIAID ChemDB: 032942
- CompTox Dashboard (EPA): DTXSID401011472
- ECHA InfoCard: 100.111.201

Chemical and physical data
- Formula: (C_{10}H_{8}O_{3}S.CH_{2}O.Na)_{x}
- Molar mass: Approximately 5 kg/mol

PRO 2000 is an experimental vaginal microbicide which has been proposed as a preventive medicine for reducing the risk of contracting HIV. It has never been recommended as an effective medicine to be used for any purpose. Some clinical trials have shown that under some conditions it may provide some protection against HIV.

== History ==
Endo Pharmaceuticals manufactures the drug.

== Efficacy ==
Animal testing studies done on macaques have shown that PRO 2000 is effective in preventing the transmission of HIV. Other studies have given supportive evidence that the product is safe in humans and would be an appropriate candidate for testing.

A phase III clinical trial of 9385 women in sub-Saharan Africa showed that PRO 2000 was not effective in preventing transmission of HIV.
