= FHI 360 =

US nonprofit human development organization

- Founded: 1971
- Type: Non-government organization
- Purpose: Public Health; international development; education; nutrition; environment; economic development; civil society; gender equality; youth; research; technology; social marketing; communication
- Location: North Carolina, United States
- Region served: Currently operating in more than 60 nations
- Revenue: $790,900,000+ (2023)
- Employees: 2,200 employees
- Website: www.fhi360.org
- Formerly called: Family Health International, International Fertility Research Program

FHI 360 (formerly Family Health International) is a global nonprofit organization based in North Carolina. FHI 360 operates in more than 60 countries and all U.S. states and territories. Established in 1971, the organization manages projects relating to health and economic development. In 1986 the organization began a worldwide response to HIV/AIDS. FHI 360's research and programs also address malaria, tuberculosis, and other infectious and chronic diseases as well as challenges like poverty, underemployment and financial instability. The organization is supported by governments, foundations, research institutions, and private corporations such as GE and Johnson & Johnson.

== History ==
Other major sponsors of HIV/AIDS programs, as well as other health and development areas, include the United Kingdom's Foreign, Commonwealth and Development Office (FCDO), the Gates Foundation and the Global Fund to Fight AIDS, Tuberculosis and Malaria. Other governments, private foundations, and the private sector have partnered with FHI 360 to overcome health and development challenges.

In 2010, Family Health International rebranded itself and its name was simplified to FHI, reflecting a broadened scope that encompasses health and development as well as service to families, communities, and nations.

In 2011, FHI and the Academy for Educational Development came together to create FHI 360. Current staff includes experts in health, education, nutrition, environment, economic development, civil society, youth, research and technology. FHI 360 serves more than 60 countries and all U.S. states and territories.

== Innovations ==
=== CAPRISA 004 ===
FHI 360 contributed to a clinical trial called CAPRISA 004, which provided an important breakthrough in the fight against HIV and genital herpes with a vaginal gel that significantly reduces a woman's risk of infection.

== Affiliations ==
=== CSIS Commission on Smart Global Health Policy ===
Family Health International's president for Public Health Programs, Peter Lamptey, was named a member of the CSIS Commission on Smart Global Health Policy in 2009. The Commission brings together 26 prominent leaders from the private sector, the United States Congress, academia, media, and the security, foreign policy, and global health communities to set goals and priorities for US global health efforts.

The Commission released its final report titled "A Healthier, Safer, and More Prosperous World" in March 2010.

== Projects in countries around the world ==
=== In Vietnam ===
- Initiative in Vietnam to reduce cigarette smoking (Initiative Click No-smoking, Vietnamese: Click không thuốc lá). It was initiated and implemented by Family Health International in cooperation with Vietnam Youth Union (Communist Party of Vietnam) and Vietnam National Committee on Smoking and Health (VINACOSH) on website https://clickkhongthuocla.vn
- The Sustainable HIV Response From Technical Assistance (SHIFT) Project worth 26 million dollars
