= Gabriel Victora =

- Education: New York University Medical School; Mannes School of Music
- Awards: 2017 MacArthur Genius Grant
- Scientific career
- Fields: Immunology
- Workplaces: Rockefeller University; Howard Hughes Medical Institute; Massachusetts Institute of Technology

Gabriel D. Victora is an immunologist who is a recipient of the 2017 MacArthur Genius Grant for his research on the adaptive immune system and the processes by which it adjusts its reactions to infections. He is the Laurie and Peter Grauer Professor at Rockefeller University, where he heads the Laboratory of Lymphocyte Dynamics, and a Howard Hughes Medical Institute Investigator.

== Early life ==
Victora is the son of Cesar Victora, an epidemiologist and professor. He moved from Brazil to the United States when he was 17.

== Career ==
Victora earned a B.M. in 1998 and M.M. in 2000, both in piano, from the Mannes College of Music before changing the focus of his studies and earning a M.S. in immunology from the University of São Paulo. Victora earned his PhD in 2011 from New York University Medical School. From 2012 to 2016, he was a fellow at the Whitehead Institute for Biomedical Research at the Massachusetts Institute of Technology. In 2012, he earned the NIH Director's Early Independence Award for his work using two-photon microscopy to understand the changes over time of the level of diversity of antibodies in germinal centers. In 2018, he was given the NIH Director's Pioneer Award.
