= Cesar Victora =

Epidemiologist

Cesar G. Victora
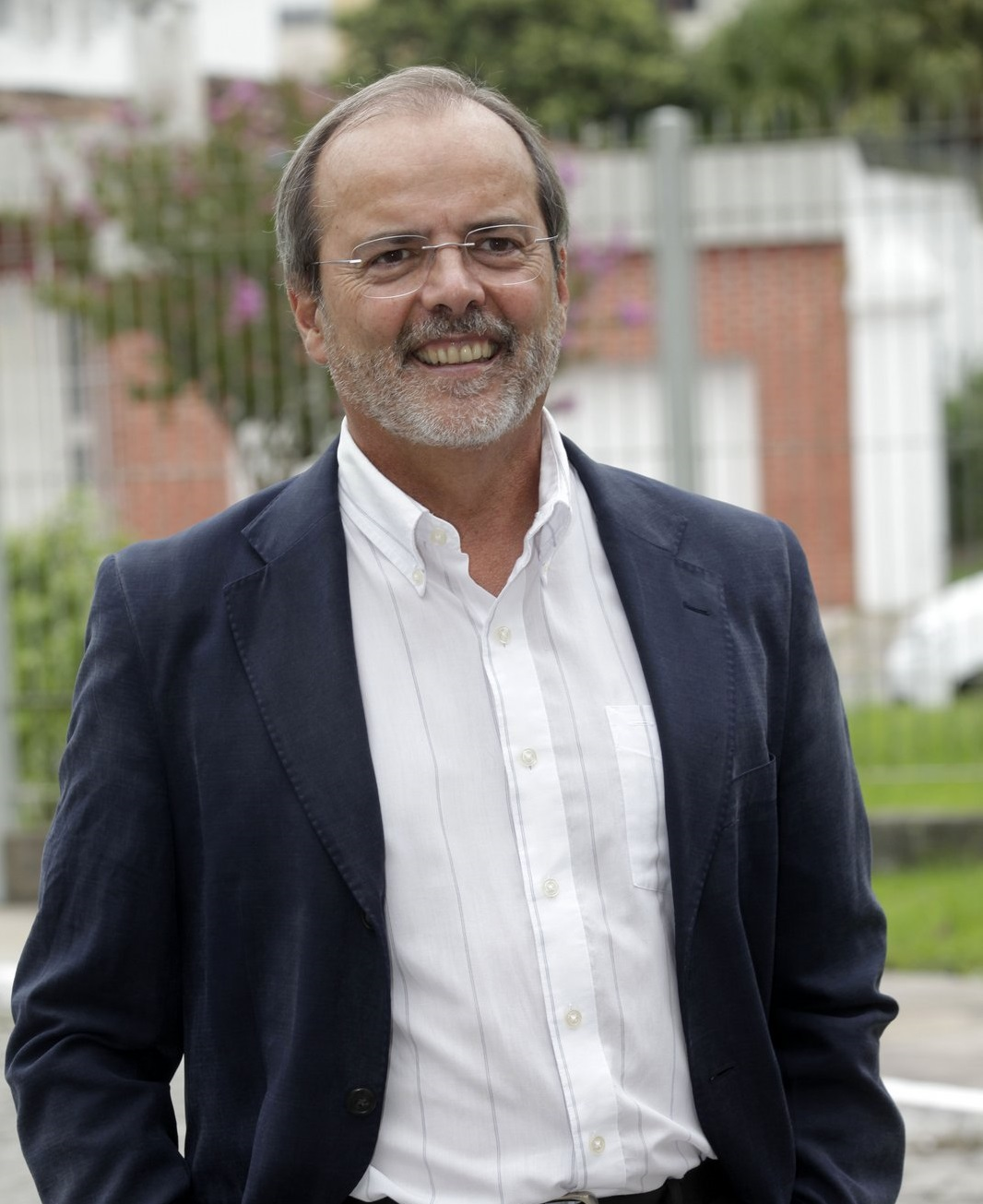
- Born: March 28, 1952 (age 74); São Gabriel, Rio Grande do Sul State, Brazil

Academic background
- Education: Federal University of Rio Grande do Sul; London School of Hygiene and Tropical Medicine

Cesar G. Victora (born 1952) is a Brazilian-born epidemiologist, academic and specialist in child health and nutrition. He is an Emeritus Professor of Epidemiology at the Federal University of Pelotas and holds or has held honorary appointments at the Universities of Harvard, Oxford, and Johns Hopkins, and at the London School of Hygiene and Tropical Medicine.

Victora's research has driven global policies on breastfeeding and early nutrition. His research includes Multi-Country Evaluation of IMCI and the COHORTS collaboration. Moreover, he was the joint principal investigator of the three Pelotas Birth Cohort Studies conducted in 1982, 1993 and 2004. He was one of the coordinators of the Multicenter Growth Reference Study that led to the development of WHO Child Growth Standards. In 2017, he was awarded the Canada Gairdner Global Health Award.

Victora has served on various international committees for the World Health Organization and UNICEF in the areas of child health and nutrition. He was a founding member and the scientific coordinator of the Countdown to 2015 Initiative that tracked progress of countries toward the Millennium Development Goals. He is one of the leaders of the new Countdown to 2030 initiative for monitoring the United Nations’ Sustainable Development Goals aimed at reducing maternal and child mortality. In 2024, he was elected to the Royal Society as a foreign member.

== Education and training ==
Victora was born in São Gabriel, Rio Grande do Sul, Brazil on 28 March 1952. He graduated in medicine at the Federal University of Rio Grande do Sul in 1976, when he began a one-year-long residency in community health at the Murialdo Health Centre, Secretaria da Saúde do Rio Grande do Sul. The next year he began teaching at Federal University of Pelotas.

In 1980, Victora moved to the United Kingdom for his Ph.D. in health care epidemiology, at London School of Hygiene and Tropical Medicine. His Ph.D. thesis was entitled The epidemiology of child health in Southern Brazil. The relationships between mortality, nutrition, health care and agricultural development. He completed his Ph.D. in 1983.

== Later career ==
After completing his Ph.D, Victora returned to Brazil and, jointly with Fernando Barros, became the principal investigator in one of the longest-running birth cohort studies in the world, the 1982 Pelotas Birth Cohort, in which 6,000 individuals have been followed up to the present time as of 2017. With Barros, he also set up new birth cohorts in 1993, 2004 and 2015, making the city of Pelotas one of the most intensively studied populations in the world.

In 1980's, Victora conducted the first study showing the importance of exclusive breastfeeding for preventing infant mortality. His findings contributed to global policy recommendations by UNICEF and the World Health Organization for mothers to breastfeed their infants exclusively for the first six months of life. Victora's research during this time helped understand how the first 1000 days influence the lifelong outcomes such as chronic illnesses and human capital.

Victora became a UNICEF consultant for Brazilian Country Office in 1987 and served in this position until 1993. Later, in 1995 he became a UNICEF Consultant for Evaluation and Research Office at UNICEF in New York for one year, where he led the development of the Multiple Indicator Cluster Surveys, currently used in several countries. In 1996, he became the head of the WHO Collaborating Centre for Nutrition in the area of Maternal and Child Nutrition at the Federal University of Pelotas. The same year he was also given the title of Honorary Professor at Department of Epidemiology, London School of Hygiene and Tropical Medicine.

In 1997, Victora became the Senior Technical Advisor for the Multi-Country Evaluation of the Integrated Management of Childhood Illness Strategy at World Health Organization, Geneva, a study that involved 12 countries. He coordinated the Lancet/Bellagio Child Survival Series in 2003 and later became one of the founding members of Countdown to 2015: Maternal, Newborn and Child Health initiative.

Victora began teaching at Bloomberg School of Public Health, Johns Hopkins University in 2007. In 2008, he stepped down from his position of the Head of the WHO Collaborating Centre at the Federal University of Pelotas. Victora became professor emeritus at the Federal University of Pelotas in 2009 and in 2012, Oxford University made him an Honorary Fellow. From 2011 to 2014, he served as the President of the International Epidemiological Association. In 2014, he also started teaching at the Harvard TH Chan School of Public Health as Visiting Professor.

At the Federal University of Pelotas, Victora coordinates the International Center for Equity in Health. He has over 680 peer-reviewed publications and is a member of the editorial boards of several journals, including The Lancet. More recently, his long-term birth cohorts documented the benefits of breastfeeding for adult intelligence, education and income. Victora also made important contributions on how to evaluate the impact of health programs on child mortality, and on the study of social inequalities in child health. As of 2017, he currently leads the International Center for Equity in Health.

== Personal life ==
Victora's work is based in Pelotas where he lives with his wife Mariangela Silveira, an obstetrician. His son, Gabriel Victora is a professor at Rockefeller University and a 2017 MacArthur Fellow.

== Honors and awards ==
- 1992 - Sendas National Health Prize, Rio de Janeiro, Brazil
- 1996 - State Medical Prize (1st Edition), State Health Council and State Secretariat of Health, Rio Grande do Sul State, Brazil
- 2001 - Renowned Researcher Prize (Health Sector), Rio Grande do Sul State Research Foundation
- 2005 - Awarded the honorary title of "Citizen of Pelotas", by the City Mayor, Bernardo de Souza
- 2005 - Conrado Wessel Prize in Medicine
- 2006 - Elected as full member of the Brazilian Academy of Sciences
- 2008 - National Order of Scientific Merit Medal, having been awarded the degree of “Comendador” of the Brazilian Republic
- 2008 - Carso Institute Award for Personal Trajectory in Health Research
- 2008 - Pan American Health and Education Foundation's Abraham Horwitz Award for Leadership in Inter-American Health
- 2010 - National Order of Medical Merit Medal, having been awarded the degree of “Comendador” of the Brazilian Republic
- 2010 - Global Pediatric Research Award by Hospital for Sick Children
- 2016 - Prize of the 54th Legislature, State Assembly of Rio Grande do Sul, Brazil.
- 2017 - John Dirks Canada Gairdner Global Health Award
- 2017 - Patricia Martens Annual Award for Excellence in Breastfeeding Research by Journal of Human Lactation, International Lactation Consultants Association
- 2018, 2019, 2020, 2021 - Highly-Cited Scientist, Clarivate/Web of Science (among the top 1% of the world's scientists in his field)
- 2020 - Science and Technology Prize, CBMM (Companhia Brasileira de Metalurgia e Mineração).
- 2021 - Richard Doll Prize, International Epidemiological Association
- 2023 - National Order of Scientific Merit Medal, having been awarded the degree of Great Cross of the Brazilian Republic
- 2023 - Almirante Alvaro Alberto Medal, Brazil Navy/National Council for Scientific and Technological Development
- 2024 - Elected as Foreign Member of the Royal Society, United Kingdom

== Bibliography ==
=== Books and monographs ===
- Epidemiologia da desigualdade: um estudo longitudinal de 6000 crianças brasileiras [The epidemiology of inequality: a longitudinal study of 6000 Brazilian children]. São Paulo: Cebes-Hucitec, 1988; (2nd edition published in 1989; 3rd edition in 1992). Spanish Edition: Epidemiologia de la Desigualdad. Washington: Pan-American Health Organization, 1992.
- Saúde e nutrição das crianças nordestinas. Pesquisas estaduais 1987-92 [Health and nutrition of children of Northeastern Brazil. State surveys 1987-92]. Brasília: UNICEF, 1995.
- Evidence on the long-term effects of breastfeeding: systematic reviews and meta-analyses. Geneva: WHO, 2007. (ISBN 978-92-4-159523-0).
- Practical Epidemiology: Using Epidemiology to Support Primary Health Care. Oxford University Press, 2021 (ISBN 9780192848741).

=== Articles and papers ===
- Evidence for protection by breast-feeding against infant deaths from infectious diseases in Brazil The Lancet 330, 319-322 (1987)
- The role of conceptual frameworks in epidemiological analysis: a hierarchical approach. International journal of epidemiology 26 (1), 224-227 (1997)
- Evaluation designs for adequacy, plausibility and probability of public health programme performance and impact. International journal of epidemiology 28 (1), 10-18 (2003)
- Applying an equity lens to child health and mortality: more of the same is not enough. The Lancet 362, 233-241 (2003)
- Evidence-based public health: moving beyond randomized trials. American Journal of Public Health 94 (3), 400-405 (2004)
- How can we achieve and maintain high-quality performance of health workers in low-resource settings? The Lancet 366, 1026-1035 (2005)
- Rapid growth in infancy and childhood and obesity in later life–a systematic review Obesity Reviews 6 (2), 143-154 (2005)
- Maternal and child undernutrition: consequences for adult health and human capital. The Lancet 371, 340-357 (2008)
- Worldwide timing of growth faltering: revisiting implications for interventions using the World Health Organization growth standards. Pediatrics 125, e473-80 (2010)
- Maternal and child undernutrition and overweight in low-income and middle-income countries. The Lancet 382, 427-451 (2013)
- International standards for newborn weight, length, and head circumference by gestational age and sex: the Newborn Cross-Sectional Study of the INTERGROWTH-21st Project. The Lancet 384, 857-868 (2014).[33]
- Breastfeeding in the 21st century: epidemiology, mechanisms, and lifelong effect. The Lancet 387, 475-490 (2016).[34]
- Revisiting maternal and child undernutrition in low-income and middle-income countries: variable progress towards an unfinished agenda. The Lancet 397, 1388-1399 (2021).[35]
