= King K. Holmes =

American physician (1937–2025)

King Kennard Holmes (September 1, 1937 – March 9, 2025) was an American physician, microbiologist, epidemiologist and medical school professor. He was an internationally recognized expert on sexually transmitted diseases, especially HIV/AIDS.

== Life and career ==
Holmes graduated in 1955 from White Bear Senior High in White Bear Township, Ramsey County, Minnesota and in 1959 with a bachelor's degree from Harvard College (the undergraduate college of Harvard University). He received in 1963 his M.D. from Cornell University Medical College (now named Weill Cornell Medicine) and in 1967 his Ph.D. in microbiology from the University of Hawaii. In 1969 he became a faculty member at the University of Washington, where in 2006 he was appointed to the William H. Foege Chair of Global Health. He was the author or co-author of over 550 articles.

In 2013 Holmes received both the Canada Gairdner Global Health Award and the IDSA's Alexander Fleming Award for lifetime achievement.

Holmes died in Seattle on March 9, 2025, at the age of 87.
