= CAPRISA =

South African HIV/AIDS research institute

- Purpose: AIDS research
- Location: Durban, South Africa
- Director: Salim Abdool Karim
- Website: http://www.caprisa.org/

CAPRISA ("Centre for the AIDS Programme of Research in South Africa") is the name of an AIDS research center based in Durban, South Africa.

== History ==
CAPRISA was established in 2002 under the National Institutes of Health program called Comprehensive International Program of Research on AIDS (CIPRA). Five partner institutions participated in the founding: University of KwaZulu-Natal, University of Cape Town, University of Western Cape, National Institute of Communicable Diseases, and Columbia University in New York. UNAIDS recognizes CAPRISA with the designation of "Collaborating Centre for HIV Prevention Research".

CAPRISA's mission is to promote HIV prevention and research its epidemiology.

== CAPRISA 004 ==
CAPRISA 004 is the name of a clinical trial testing a microbicide which was experimentally shown to be effective in reducing women's risk of contracting HIV.
