= Science for Society =

Science for Society (S4S)
- Founded: 2010
- Founder: Vaibhav Tidke
- Type: Non-governmental organization NGO
- Location: India
- Website: www.scienceforsociety.com

Science for Society (also known as S4S Technologies) is a technology-based social enterprise that started in 2008 as an informal group of students from different backgrounds including engineering, medical, business and science. Science for Society was registered as an NGO in 2010; Vaibhav Tidke was the founder.

== Objectives ==
Science for Society's main field of operation is in social welfare through using technology, low cost and innovative, renewable, environmentally friendly technology solutions arising among an interdisciplinary pool of student volunteers.

== Projects ==
=== Solar dryer ===
A solar-powered dryer was the first project started by S4S with the aim of achieving higher efficiency at low cost so that small farmers from India could use this technology to dry their crops. This patented technology is based on combination of various modes of heat transfer, achieving higher efficiency, reducing processing time and reducing capital costs. Fabrication is done locally from aluminium, onsite insulation and plastic sheet. A pilot plant and quality control lab set up of 100 kg/day is established through funds from United Nations Environment Programme.

=== Water disinfection units ===
This project aims to provide clean, pathogen-free, water to the rural population who do not have access to electric water purifiers because of high cost and non-availability of electricity. Three different technology water disinfection units are developed: Solar disinfection unit, UV-based disinfection unit, and uLtra filtration disinfection unit.

=== MotherCare ===
This project was initiated with the aim of providing healthcare to pregnant woman from rural parts of Maharashtra, India. In this project, Telemedicine wireless modes of communication are used so as to overcome the distance and infrastructure barriers. Parameters like blood pressure, hemoglobin count, body temperature are measured and regular reports are sent to the doctor who is in the urban area.

=== Dental X-ray ===
In traditional dental X-ray, the operator has to periodically change the chemical thrice. This technology is designed to achieve a low cost, automatic, portable x-ray machine which can be transported to rural towns and thus providing healthcare solutions.

== Recognition ==
Yahoo Innovation Jockey 2, INDIA 2013

CareMother- Mobile Pregnancy Care won Public Services Industry category award at Yahoo Innovation Jockey 2 recently at Bangalore, India, sponsored by Accenture.

Millennium Alliance Award, INDIA 2013

Millennium Award is received for S4S new technology called “HaldiTech”, which significantly reduces time for haldi processing from 20 to 25 days to 1 day. Millennium Alliance is joint programme by DST, USAID, FICCI.

Innocentive Challenge, USA 2011

S4S team of Management Studies and Medical Sciences: Santosh Lohiya and Deepak Kadam provided business model and strategies for medical equipment in rural India and won the challenge.

TUNZA International Youth Conference, Indonesia 2011

The conference is organized by UNEP and Govt. of Indonesia. Mr. Swapnil Kokate, CO-founder of S4S represented India.

DST Lockheed Martin India Innovation Growth Programme 2011

S4S project of Dental X-Ray won the gold medal at New Delhi, organized by DST, FICCI, Lockheed Martin and University of Texas

Bayer Young Environment Leadership Award

International award initiated by Bayer and United Nations Environment Programme (Presented at Bayer Headquarters, Germany, 2010) to S4S founder.

Mondialogo Engineering Award 2009

Silver and Bronze award to S4S team by UNESCO and Daimler AG for Solar and UV based water disinfection unit at Mercedez Benz Museum, Stuttgart, Germany.
