= Technology Innovation Agency =

South African agency

- Headquarters: Pretoria, South Africa
- Website: http://www.tia.org.za/

The Technology Innovation Agency was created by an act of the South African parliament on 24 November 2008.

TIA is an initiative of the Department of Science & Technology (DST) that came into existence through the promulgation of the Technology Innovation Agency Act No.26 of 2008. TIA’s mandate is to enable and support technological innovation across all sectors of the economy in order to achieve socio-economic benefits for South Africa and enhance its global competitiveness. This entails supporting the development and commercialisation of research outputs from Higher Education Institutions, Science Councils, Public Entities, and private research institutions and bringing them to market.

== Latest News ==
TIA's CEO, Simphiwe Duma, and CFO Barbara Kortjass, have been summarily dismissed from their posts in April 2014 after a forensic inquiry. Activities revealed in the forensic audit have also been reported to authorities in terms of the Public Finance Management Act and the Prevention and Combating of Corrupt Activities (PCCA). Duma failed to adhere to the agency’s recruitment policy when signing an employment contract installing his ex-wife Kgomotso Matjila as TIA’s GM for marketing and branding in 2010 and Nhlanhla Nyide as TIA’s communications specialist in 2011. COO Mkhululi Mazibuko and Werner van der Merwe are acting CEO and CFO respectively.

In 2013, Science and technology director general Phil Mjwara wrote to Dr Ramphele, the former chair of the board, informing her of the forensic investigation regarding “the alleged breakdown of corporate governance, policy and procedural issues in respect of procurement of services, recruitment and appointment of staff, and investment processes. Dr Ramphele attempted to forestall the inquiry.

- No answers in R1.5m tech probe
- Probe puts Mamphela Ramphele on back foot
- New broom sweeps TIA clean
- Troubled Technology Innovation Agency left spinning

An aircraft construction company blamed their failure on TIA's inability to effectively fund development. *

In September 2014 interim CEO Dr Rifka Kfir announced that TIA would be restructured, the budget reduced, and the number of staff reduced from about 200 to between 120 and 130.

- Heads to roll in Tech Agency Rejig

== Origin ==
TIA was formed through merging seven DST entities previously tasked with supporting and promoting innovation in the country. These entities included the Innovation Fund, Tshumisano Trust, Cape Biotech Trust, PlantBio Trust, LIFElab, BioPAD Trust, and the Advanced Manufacturing Technology Strategy (AMTS).

== Strategic goals ==
The goal of TIA is to use South Africa’s science and technology base to develop new industries, create sustainable jobs and help diversify the economy from commodity exports towards knowledge-based industries equipped to address modern global challenges. TIA has investments in numerous sectors including Advanced Manufacturing, Mining, ICT, Energy, Agriculture, Industrial Biotechnology and Health

== Business objectives pursued by TIA ==
- To support the development and demonstration of technology-based products, processes and services.
- To support the commercialisation of technology innovations.
- To develop an enabling environment for technology innovation and commercialisation in South Africa.
- To develop an enabling internal environment within TIA to successfully execute its strategy.
- To facilitate the development of innovation skills to support technology innovation and commercialisation.
- To become a schedule 3B entity in terms of the Public Finance Management Act.

== TIA offerings ==
=== Financial Support ===
TIA provides funding to a wide range of entities which includes: Small Medium Micro Sized Enterprises (SMMEs) and large companies, Science Councils and High Education Institutions.

TIA makes investments through five funding products namely:

==== Technology development fund ====
The Technology Development Fund will invest in high potential projects undertaken at the institutions such as Science Councils, High Education Institutions for pre-competitive end stage research and technology development.

==== Youth technology innovation fund ====
Aims to promote and stimulate the culture of innovation and entrepreneurship amongst young people (18yrs-35yrs) by providing access to financial, intellectual property, regulatory and business support resources.

== Non-Financial support ==
=== Technology Development ===
TIA also provides advisory services as well as technical and business support to investee companies to equip them with the necessary know-how, in order to facilitate proper development of their products and services.

=== Technology Stations and Platforms ===
The Technology Stations & Platforms portfolio comprises the Technology Platforms, Technology Stations and Industry Clusters. These are housed at the different Higher Education Institutions(HEIs).

=== Capacity Building ===
The essence for the Innovation Skills Development unit is to provide a platform to increase the capacity and skill within the innovation value chain by offering specialized and focused training and capacity development programmes within the TIA focus areas. In order to achieve this, the ISD has developed programs that are grouped into the following four categories:

- Improving Education through Technology
- Fast tracking skills in a value based manner
- Addressing skills shortage in manufacturing and industrial processes and
- Introducing non-science students to technology
