= Louis W. Sullivan =

American politician (born 1933)

Louis Sullivan
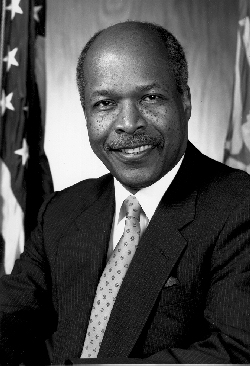
- Sullivan in 1992

17th United States Secretary of Health and Human Services
- In office March 1, 1989 – January 20, 1993
- President: George H. W. Bush
- Preceded by: Otis Bowen
- Succeeded by: Donna Shalala

Personal details
- Born: Louis Wade Sullivan; November 3, 1933 (age 92) Atlanta, Georgia, U.S.
- Party: Republican
- Spouse: Ginger Williamson
- Education: Morehouse College (BS); Boston University (MD)

Louis Wade Sullivan (born November 3, 1933) is an American physician, author and educator who served as the United States Secretary of Health and Human Services under President George H. W. Bush and was Founding Dean of the Morehouse School of Medicine.

== Biography ==
He was born in Atlanta, although his parents moved to rural Blakely, Georgia, shortly after he was born. His father was a mortician and his mother a teacher. His parents sent him, and his brother Walter, to live with friends in Atlanta during the school year where there were better public schools. By age 5, with inspiration from his family physician and encouragement from teachers and parents, Sullivan had decided he would pursue a career in healthcare.

In 1950, Sullivan graduated from Atlanta's Booker T. Washington High School as Class Salutatorian. He then enrolled at Morehouse College and graduated magna cum laude in 1954, before earning his medical degree, cum laude, from Boston University in 1958. His postgraduate training included internship and residency in internal medicine at New York Hospital – Cornell Medical Center (1958–60), a clinical fellowship in pathology at Massachusetts General Hospital (1960–61), and a research fellowship in hematology at the Thorndike Memorial Laboratory of Harvard Medical School, Boston City Hospital (1961–63).

He is certified in internal medicine and hematology, holds a mastership from the American College of Physicians and is a member of Phi Beta Kappa and Alpha Omega Alpha academic honor societies.

Sullivan was an instructor of medicine at Harvard Medical School from 1963–64, and an assistant professor of medicine at Seton Hall College of Medicine from 1964–66. In 1966, he became co-director of hematology at Boston University Medical Center and, a year later, founded the Boston University Hematology Service at Boston City Hospital. Sullivan remained at Boston University until 1975, holding positions as assistant professor of medicine, associate professor of medicine, and professor of medicine. In his teaching, he specialized in "sickle-cell anemia and blood disorders related to vitamin deficiencies".

He married E. Ginger Williamson, an attorney, on September 30, 1955. They have three children.

Sullivan is a member of Alpha Phi Alpha fraternity.

In 1992, he received the Golden Plate Award of the American Academy of Achievement. In 2000, he received an honorary degree in Doctor of Letters from Oglethorpe University.

== Morehouse School of Medicine ==
Sullivan became the founding dean and director of the Medical Education Program at Morehouse College in 1975. The program became The School of Medicine at Morehouse College in 1978, admitting its first 24 students to a two-year program in the basic medical sciences. In 1981, the school received provisional accreditation of its four-year curriculum leading to the M.D. degree, became independent from Morehouse College and was renamed Morehouse School of Medicine (MSM), with Sullivan as dean and president. In 1983, MSM became a member of the Atlanta University Center (AUC). MSM was fully accredited as a four-year medical school in April 1985 and awarded its first 16 M.D. degrees in May of that year.

With the exception of his tenure as secretary of the U.S. Department of Health and Human Services (HHS) from 1989 to 1993, Sullivan was president of Morehouse School of Medicine for more than two decades. On July 1, 2002, he retired and was appointed president emeritus.

== Secretary of Health and Human Services ==
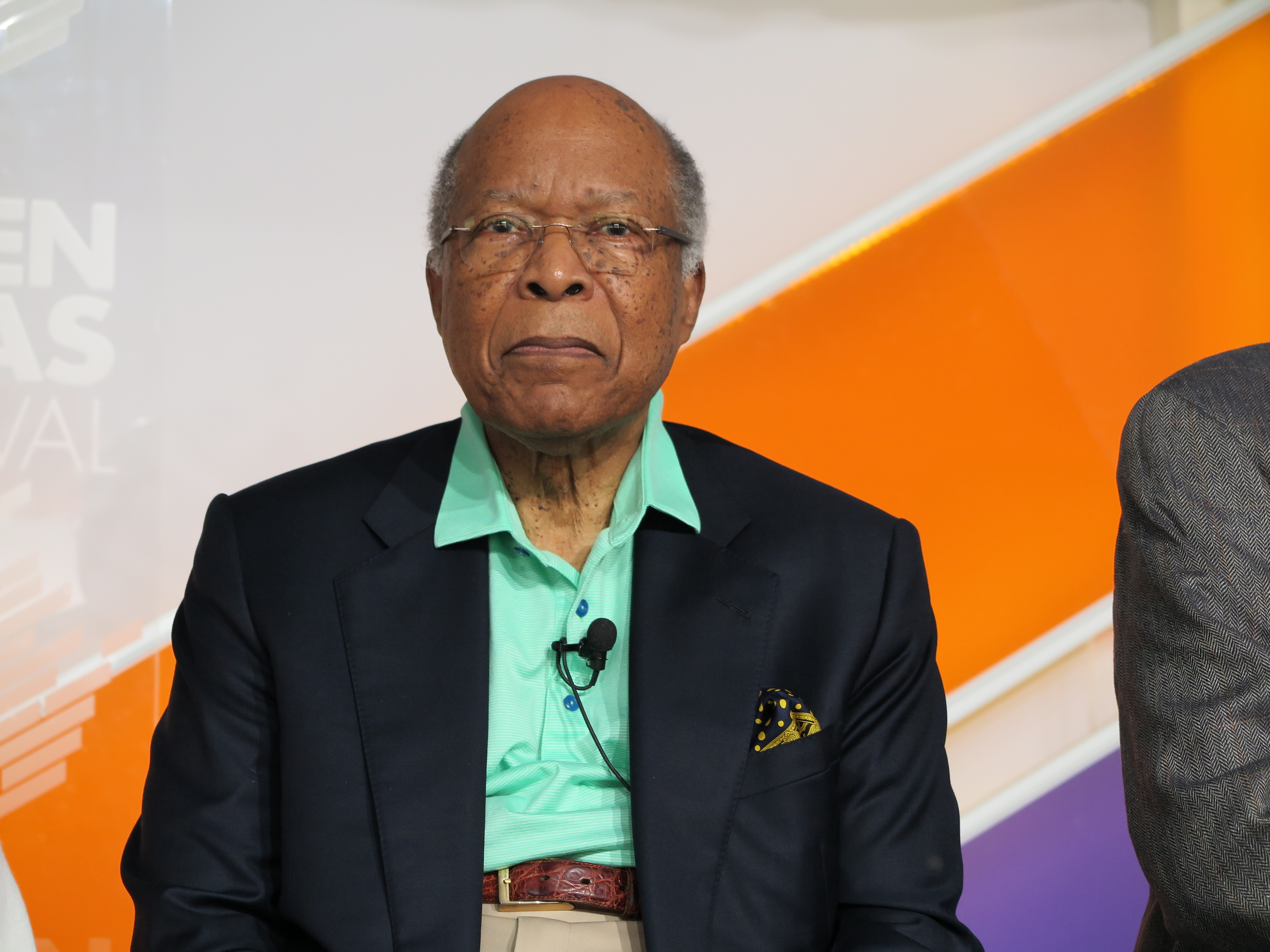
Sullivan in 2015

Sullivan left the Morehouse School of Medicine in 1989 to accept an appointment by President George H.W. Bush to serve as Secretary of Health and Human Services. In this cabinet position, Sullivan managed the federal agency responsible for the major health, welfare, food and drug safety, medical research and income security programs serving the American people.

=== Initiatives ===
Among his efforts to improve the health and health behavior of Americans were: (1) the introduction of a new and improved FDA food label; (2) the release of Healthy People 2000, a guide for improved health promotion/disease prevention activities; (3) the public education program focused on the health dangers from tobacco use (including the successful efforts to prevent the introduction of "Uptown," a non-filtered, mentholated cigarette); (4) the inauguration of a $100 million minority male health and injury prevention initiative; and (5) a greater emphasis on gender and ethnic diversity in senior positions of HHS, including the selection of the:

- First female Director of the National Institutes of Health
- First female (and first Hispanic) Surgeon General of the U.S. Public Health Service
- First African-American Commissioner of the Social Security Administration
- First African-American Administrator (Acting) of the Health Care Financing Administration and
- First female Chief of Staff of the Department of Health and Human Services

In 1991, Sullivan formed the Workgroup for Electronic Data Interchange (WEDI). WEDI was designated in the 1996 HIPAA legislation as an advisor to HHS. WEDI is an authority on the use of Health IT to improve healthcare information exchange in order to enhance the quality of care, improve efficiency, and reduce costs of our nation's healthcare system. In 2013, on the 20th anniversary of the original WEDI Report, WEDI brought together healthcare, corporate and government organizations to create an updated WEDI Report to guide the future of health information exchange. The 2013 WEDI Report was managed by an Executive Steering Committee led by Sullivan.

In January 1993, he returned to Morehouse School of Medicine and resumed the office of president until 2002.

== Sullivan Commission ==
Established in 2003, the Sullivan Commission on Diversity in the Healthcare Workforce [was] an outgrowth of a grant from the W.K. Kellogg Foundation to Duke University School of Medicine. Named for former U.S. Secretary of Health and Human Services, Louis W. Sullivan, M.D., the Commission [was] composed of 16 health, business, higher education and legal experts and other leaders. Former U.S. Senate Majority Leader Robert Dole and former U.S. Congressman and Congressional Health Subcommittee Chairman Paul Rogers [served] as Honorary Co-Chairs.

The Sullivan Commission [made] policy recommendations to bring about systemic change that [addressed] the scarcity of minorities in the health professions. The work of the Commission [came] at a time when enrollment of racial and ethnic minorities in nursing, medicine, and dentistry has stagnated despite America's growing diversity. While African Americans, Hispanic Americans, and American Indians, as a group, constitute nearly 25 percent of the U.S. population, these three groups account for less than 9 percent of nurses, 6 percent of physicians, and only 5 percent of dentists.

The Sullivan Commission gathered testimonies from health, education, religion and business leaders; community and civil rights advocates; health care practitioners; and students. Drawing upon the expertise and experience of the Commissioners, and the witnesses who provided valuable testimony, the Commission's report, Missing Persons: Minorities in the Health Professions, [provided] the nation with a blueprint for achieving diversity in the health professions.

== Sullivan Alliance to Transform the Health Professions ==
Sullivan organized The Sullivan Alliance in January 2005, to act on the reports and recommendations of the Sullivan Commission (Missing Persons: Minorities in the Health Professions), and the Institute of Medicine Committee on Institutional and Policy-Level Strategies for Increasing the Diversity of the U.S. Healthcare Workforce.

The Sullivan Alliance became a 501c.3. non-profit organization in 2011. The Sullivan Alliance: (1) raises awareness of the importance and value of achieving racial and ethnic diversity in the health professions; (2) disseminates information about "best practices" and resources that enhance the health professions pipeline; and (3) stimulates academic programs and partnerships in the health professions of medicine, dentistry, nursing, psychology and public health to create new—or more effectively implement existing—diversity initiatives.

The Sullivan Alliance actively participates in a project funded by the W.K. Kellogg Foundation to train mid-level dental professionals, thereby addressing the shortage of dentists and increasing the diversity in the dental professions.

The Sullivan Alliance has developed an international consortium that is building a U.S.-Caribbean health disparities research partnership that responds to the Institute of Medicine's 2009 report, U.S. Commitment to Global Health: Recommendations for the Public and Private Sector, by conducting research that lessens knowledge gaps about global health disparities. The project focuses on epidemiological research in order to advance understanding of the relationships among health factors such as: history-ancestry, language, indigenous health practices, life styles, and socioeconomic status. Funded by the Department of Health and Human Services through a cooperative agreement with NIH's National Institute on Minority Health and Health Disparities (NIH-NIMHD), the United States of America (U.S.)-Caribbean Alliance for Health Disparities Research (USCAHDR) consortium includes NIMHD, The Sullivan Alliance; and The University of the West Indies.

== National Health Museum ==
Sullivan is chairman of the Atlanta-based National Health Museum. The National Health Museum (NHM) will educate and inspire Americans to live healthier lives. NHM will help move our society from simply treating disease to promoting and maintaining health. NHM will build and lead a national health and wellness community with two platforms: a global online network and digital information hub called the Cyber Museum, and a visitor center at Atlanta's Centennial Olympic Park called the Experience Museum.

== Other activities ==
=== Board member ===
Sullivan serves on the boards of a number of organizations including: Henry Schein, United Therapeutics, Emergent BioSolutions, and BioSante Pharmaceuticals. He is retired from the boards of General Motors, 3M, Bristol-Myers Squibb, Cigna, Household International (now HBSC), and Equifax.

Sullivan is the founding president of the Association of Minority Health Professions Schools (AMHPS). He is a former member of the Joint Committee on Health Policy of the Association of American Universities and the National Association of Land Grant Colleges and Universities.

He also is a member of the boards of Africare in Washington, D.C., and Callaway Gardens in Pine Mountain, Georgia.

=== Other leadership roles ===
In 1985, Sullivan was one of the founders of Medical Education for South African Blacks (MESAB). From 1994–2007, he served as chairman of the organization, which raised scholarship funds in the United States and South Africa for more than 10,000 black health professions students, who are now physicians, nurses, dentists and other health professionals in South Africa.

In March 2008, Sullivan was appointed to the new Grady Hospital Corporation Board of Trustees. In June 2008, Sullivan accepted appointments to (a) the Health Disparities Technical Expert Panel (HDTEP) of the Centers for Medicare and Medicaid Services (CMS) of HHS and (b) an Institute of Medicine Committee, "Improving the Organization of the U.S. Department of Health and Human Services to Advance the Health of Our Population."

=== Publications ===
Sullivan has authored and co-authored many academic papers. Recently, he has also contributed to two books: The Morehouse Mystique: Becoming a Doctor at the Nation's Newest African American Medical School (Author: Marybeth Gasman. Publisher: Johns Hopkins University Press. 2012); and Breaking Ground: My Life in Medicine (Authors: Louis W. Sullivan and David Chanoff. Publisher: University of Georgia Press. 2014)

=== Annual Sullivan 5K Run/Walk ===
In 1989, Sullivan and his wife Ginger founded the Annual Sullivan 5K Run/Walk on Martha's Vineyard in Oak Bluffs, MA. The race promotes their belief in the health benefits of daily exercise. The event celebrated its 35th anniversary in 2023 and approximately $800,000 has been raised to support the Martha's Vineyard Hospital.

== Honors ==
In 2024, Dr. Sullivan was inducted as a Georgia Trustee, an honor given by the Georgia Historical Society in conjunction with the Governor of Georgia to individuals whose accomplishments and community service reflect the ideals of the founding body of Trustees, which governed the Georgia colony from 1732 to 1752.

== See also ==
- List of African-American United States Cabinet members

Political offices
Preceded by Otis R. Bowen	United States Secretary of Health and Human Services; 1989–1993	Succeeded by Donna Shalala
U.S. order of precedence (ceremonial)
Preceded by Samuel K. Skinner as Former U.S. Cabinet Member	Order of precedence of the United States as Former U.S. Cabinet Member	Succeeded by Lynn Morley Martin as Former U.S. Cabinet Member
