= Sesotho Media =

Sesotho Media and Development (SMD) is a non-governmental organization which focuses on promoting film and education within Lesotho.

== Activities ==
In 2011, SMD started Lesotho Film Festival to encourage young Basotho filmmakers by giving them a platform to share their work. As of 12 November 2019, the film festival has run nine times with the most recent event showcasing 23 locally-produced films as well as three international ones. According to SMD's film festival coordinator, they try to target both amateur and professional groups with separate categories for each.

Seotho Media uses film to encourage social causes by facilitating documentary screenings and trainings with youth groups. They also host an annual two day film workshop aimed tackling issues that face young women in Lesotho such as unintended pregnancy.
