= WEDI =

WEDI may refer to:

- WEDI (AM), an AM radio station located in Eaton, Ohio
- Workgroup for Electronic Data Interchange (WEDI)

== See also ==
- Wedi 7
- WEDY
- WIDI (disambiguation)
