= Mary Thygeson Shepardson =

American anthropologist

Mary Thygeson Shepardson (May 26, 1906 - March 30, 1997) was an American anthropologist who researched and published extensively on the Navajo people of the American Southwest.

== Early life ==
Shepardson was born in St. Paul, Minnesota on May 26, 1906, as the fourth child to suffragette Sylvie Thompson Thygeson and Nels Marcus Thygeson. Her parents were both described as educated and well-informed on social justice issues of the day, such as birth control, women's suffrage, and racial equality. Nels died when Shepardson was eleven, which was a devastating event for the family.

== Education ==
Shepardson studied at Stanford beginning when she was 16, in 1922. She graduated cum laude in 1928, but not before studying at the Sorbonne in 1925 and the London School of Economics in 1926.

A gap in Shepardson's education corresponds to her marriage of her widowed brother-in-law, Dr. Dwight Shepardson in 1943 (some sources say 1942).

Shepardson returned to Stanford for her master's degree, graduating in 1956. She continued on for a PhD at University of California at Berkeley, earning that in only four years, in 1960, just as she turned fifty-four.

== Career and research ==
After her PhD, she became a Fellow in Anthropology for the National Science Foundation.

Published in 1970, her research first focused on political process, comparing two Navajo communities, published as "The Navajo Mountain Community: Social Organization and Kinship Terminology". She did this and similar research with laws, courts, decision-making in the field among the Navajo people throughout the 1960s. She was associated during this time with the University of Chicago.

Shepardson briefly taught at Mills College after she earned her PhD, then joined the faculty of San Francisco State University in 1967 after her husband's death. She moved to a professor emeritus in 1973.

== Personal life ==
Shepardson married Dr. Dwight Shepardson, her brother-in-law, after her own sister's death. The couple made many trips to Navajo villages in the Southwest.

After a long illness, she died at the age of 90 on March 30, 1997, in Palo Alto, California.
