= Widi (disambiguation) =

Widi is a village in Burkina Faso.

Widi, WiDi, or WIDI may also refer to:

- WiDi, wireless display technology by Intel
- WIDI, a radio station
- WIDI, a marketing term used by Central Music Company to refer to wireless MIDI over Bluetooth

== See also ==
- Widi language (disambiguation)
- Wide-Eye, a British animated children's TV Series
- WEDI (disambiguation)
