= Widi language =

Widi language may refer to:

- Wiri language, an extinct Aboriginal language of eastern Queensland, Australia
- A possible dialect of Badimaya language, in Western Australia

== See also ==
- Widi (disambiguation)
