= Unintended pregnancy =

Pregnancy that is unplanned at the time of conception

An unintended pregnancy is a pregnancy that is mistimed or unwanted at the time of conception, also known as an unplanned pregnancy.

Sexual activity without the use of effective contraception through choice or coercion is the predominant cause of unintended pregnancy. Worldwide, the unintended pregnancy rate is approximately 45% of all pregnancies (for a total of 120 million unintended pregnancies annually), but rates vary in different geographic areas and among different sociodemographic groups. Unintended pregnancies may be unwanted pregnancies or mistimed pregnancies. While unintended pregnancies are the main reason for induced abortions, unintended pregnancies may also result in other outcomes, such as live births or miscarriages.

Unintended pregnancy has been linked to numerous poor maternal and child health outcomes, regardless of the outcome of the pregnancy. Efforts to decrease rates of unintended pregnancy have focused on improving access to effective contraception through improved counseling and removing barriers to contraception access.

== Definitions ==
Research on unintended pregnancy rates is challenging, as categorizing a pregnancy as "intended" or "unintended" does not capture the many complex considerations that go into a person's or couple's feelings towards the pregnancy itself or their reproductive plans in general. However, for data collection purposes, an "unintended pregnancy" is defined as a pregnancy that occurs either when a woman wanted to become pregnant in the future but not at the time she became pregnant, or one that occurred when she did not want to become pregnant then or at any time in the future.

Conversely, an "intended pregnancy" is one that is consciously desired at the time of conception or sooner. For research purposes, all pregnancies not explicitly categorized as "unintended" are combined, including those pregnancies where the pregnant woman feels ambivalent or unsure about the pregnancy. Most sources consider only the intentions of the woman when defining whether a pregnancy is unintended, but some sources also consider the intentions of the male partner.

Terming a pregnancy "unintended" does not indicate whether or not a pregnancy is welcomed, or what the outcome of the pregnancy is; unintended pregnancies may end in abortion, miscarriage, or birth.

== Epidemiology ==
=== Global incidence ===
The global rate of unintended pregnancy was estimated at 44% of all pregnancies between 2010 and 2014, corresponding to approximately 62 unintended pregnancies per 1000 women between the ages of 15 and 44 years old. While unintended pregnancy rates have been slowly declining in most areas of the world, different geographic regions have different estimated unintended pregnancy rates. Rates tend to be higher in low-income regions in Latin America and Africa, estimated at 96 and 89 unintended pregnancies per 1000 women, respectively, and lower in higher-income regions such as North America and Europe, estimated at 47 and 41 unintended pregnancies per 1000 women, respectively. Unwanted pregnancies continue to be a major public health issue worldwide, especially in low- and middle-income countries. The annual number of unwanted pregnancies in Asia is estimated to be 53.8 million. It is estimated that between 2010 and 2014, around 5.4% of Asian women ages 15 to 44 had unintended pregnancies.

The United Nations Population Fund, the United Nations sexual and reproductive health agency, explains that nearly half of all pregnancies, totalling 121 million each year throughout the world, are unintended.

=== Incidence by country/region ===
==== Europe ====
From 1990–1994 to 2010–2014, European rates of unintended pregnancy decreased from approximately 66 such pregnancies per 1000 women ages 15–44 years old to 41. These rates vary between different European countries.

===== Britain =====
According to a 2013 study, approximately 16% of British pregnancies are unplanned, 29% are ambivalent, and 55% are planned.

===== France =====
In France, 33% of pregnancies are unintended. Of women at risk for unintended pregnancy, only 3% do not use contraception, and 20% use intrauterine devices (IUDs).

===== Sweden =====
One study from Sweden (2008–2010) showed that the prevalence of unintended pregnancies was 23.2%. One study conducted in Uppsala (2012–2013) found that 12% of pregnancies were fairly or very unplanned.

===== Russia =====
According to a 2004 study, current pregnancies were termed "desired and timely" by 58% of respondents, while 23% described them as "desired, but untimely", and 19% said they were "undesired".

==== Asia ====
From 2010–2014, approximately 5.4% of women aged 15–44 years old got pregnant unintentionally, and the number of unintended pregnancies was 53.8 million each year in Asia.

===== India =====
India, the number of unintended pregnancies has not changed much or been measured in a specific way in the last ten years. In each of the three rounds of the National Family Health Surveys (NFHS), about a quarter of the women in India had unintended pregnancies. Every year, there are about 121 million or 12.1 crore unintended pregnancies around the world. One of every seven of these happens in India, according to a report from the United Nations Population Fund. India's most populous state, Uttar Pradesh, with a population of about 200 million, has twice as many unwanted births as India as a whole (1.65 vs. 0.80). The level of unmet need for contraception among women in India is consistent with the incidence of unintended pregnancies and the incidence of abortions. These facts highlight the necessity for additional investment to meet the contraceptive needs of women and couples and to ensure access to safe abortion services.

===== South Korea =====
South Korea has the most serious problem of unintended pregnancy among developed countries.

The reason lies in South Korea's inadequate sex education. Because South Korea doesn't provide comprehensive sexuality education (CSE), it doesn't provide detailed instruction on contraception methods or the responsibility for responsibility. This is due to the influence of conservative groups, such as parent groups and Christian organizations.

==== Africa ====
A quarter of unintended pregnancies happen in Africa, and the average unintended pregnancy rate in Sub-Saharan Africa is 33.9%.

==== North America ====
From 1990–1994 to 2010–2014, North American rates of unintended pregnancy decreased from approximately 50 such pregnancies per 1000 women ages 15–44 years old to 47.

===== United States =====
According to the Guttmacher Institute, 45% of U.S. pregnancies in 2011 were unintended, approximately 2.8 million pregnancies per year. In 2006, most states' rates were between 40 and 65 unintended pregnancies per 1,000 women. The state with the highest rate of unintended pregnancies was Mississippi, with 69 per 1,000 women, followed by California, Delaware, the District of Columbia, Hawaii, and Nevada (66 to 67 per 1,000). New Hampshire had the lowest rate, 36 per 1,000 women, followed by Maine, North Dakota, Vermont, and West Virginia (37 to 39 per 1,000 women).

Over 92% of abortions are the result of unintended pregnancy, and unintended pregnancies result in about 1.3 million abortions per year. In 2001, 44% of unintended pregnancies resulted in births, 42% resulted in induced abortion, and the rest in miscarriage. It is estimated that more than half of US women have had an unintended pregnancy by age 45. One 2012 study found over one-third of living people in the US under 31 years of age (born since 1982) were the result of unintended pregnancies, a rate virtually unchanged from 2002.

Unintended pregnancies and births in the United States Rate per 1000 women.
Year	Unintended pregnancies	Unintended births
1981	54.2	25
1987	53.5	27
1994	44.7	21
2001	48	23
2008	51	27

== Factors associated with unintended pregnancy ==
Unintended pregnancy typically occurs after sexual activity without the use of contraception, or not using it correctly. Such pregnancies may still occur despite using contraception correctly, but are uncommon. For example, in the United States, of all the unintended pregnancies that occurred in 2008, women who used modern contraception consistently accounted for only 5% of the unintended pregnancies, while women who used contraception inconsistently or not at all accounted for 41% and 54% of all unintended pregnancies, respectively.

Many factors may influence a person or couple's consistent use of contraception; a woman may not understand her risk of unintended pregnancy, and/or may not be able to access effective birth control to prevent pregnancy. Similarly, she may also not be able to control when/how she engages in sexual activity. Thus, many factors have been associated with a higher likelihood of having an unintended pregnancy, as follows.

=== Younger age ===
Teen birth rates in the US have declined over the past few decades.

Studies across the globe consistently find that younger age (adolescence or young adulthood) increases the likelihood of a pregnancy being unintended or unplanned.

In the US, younger women who are sexually active are less likely to use contraception than other age groups, and thus are more likely to have unintended pregnancies. Approximately 18% of young women aged 15–19 years old at risk of unintended pregnancy do not use contraception, compared with 13% of women aged 20–24 and 10% of women aged 25–44.

Of the estimated 574,000 teen pregnancies (to young women aged 15–19) in the US in 2011, 75% were unintended. In 2011, the unintended pregnancy rate was 41 per 1,000 women aged 15–19. Because many teens are not sexually active, these estimates understate the risk of unintended pregnancy among teens who are having sex. Calculations that account for sexual activity find that unintended pregnancy rates are highest among sexually active women aged 15–19 years old compared to other age groups. About one-third of unintended teen pregnancies end in abortion.

The unintended pregnancy rate among teens has been declining in the US. Between 2008 and 2011, the unintended pregnancy rate declined 44% among women aged 15–17 years old and 20% among women aged 18–19 years old. This decline is attributed to improved contraceptive use among sexually active teens, rather than changes in sexual activity.

=== Relationship status ===
Relationship status has a strong correlation with unintended pregnancy, but measures for relationship status vary by study. Some studies find that being single increases the likelihood of experiencing an unintended pregnancy, some find that not living with a partner increases the likelihood, and others find cohabitation with a partner to increase the risk of unintended pregnancy.

In the US, women who are unmarried but live with their partners (cohabiting) have a higher rate of unintended pregnancy compared with both unmarried noncohabiting women (141 vs. 36–54 per 1,000) and married women (29 per 1,000).

=== Lower income ===
Poverty, lower income, and/or economic hardship increase a woman's risk of unintended pregnancy across the globe.

Poverty and lower income increase a woman's risk of unintended pregnancy. Unintended pregnancy rates among women with incomes less than 100% of the poverty line were 112 per 1,000 in 2011, more than five times higher than the rate among women with incomes of at least or greater than 200% of poverty (20 per 1,000 women).

=== Minority racial background/ethnicity ===
Women living in countries where they belong to a racial or ethnic minority group frequently have higher unintended pregnancy rates compared to women of the regional majority.

In the US, women who identify as racial minorities are at increased risk of unintended pregnancy. In 2011, the unintended pregnancy rate for non-Hispanic black women was more than double that of non-Hispanic white women (79 versus 33 per 1,000).

=== Lower education level ===
Studies across the globe consistently find that women with relatively lower educational attainment are far more likely to experience an unplanned pregnancy than more educated women; the level of education that makes the difference is relative, varying by region and country, as demonstrated by multiple studies.

Women without a high school degree had the highest unintended pregnancy rate among any educational level in 2011, at 73 per 1,000, accounting for 45% of all pregnancies in this group. Unintended pregnancy rates decreased with each level of educational attainment.

=== Lifetime abuse, Current domestic abuse, and Non-consensual intercourse ===
Sexual coercion, rape, or even forced pregnancy may be associated with unintended pregnancy, all of which sometimes happens in the context of domestic violence. Studies in various countries have linked intimate partner violence or current abuse, as well as prior abuse (incl. during childhood), to a higher risk of experiencing unintended pregnancy.

A longitudinal study in 1996 of over 4000 women in the United States followed for three years found that the rape-related pregnancy rate was 5.0% among survivors aged 12–45 years. Applying that rate to rapes committed in the United States would indicate that there are over 32,000 pregnancies in the United States as a result of rape each year.

Birth control sabotage is abuse in the form of tampering with contraception or interfering with the use of contraception in order to undermine efforts to prevent pregnancy.

=== Multiparity / Already having children ===
Women who already have children are more likely to report a pregnancy as unintended. The number of children that makes the difference is relative, varying by region and country, as demonstrated by different studies.

== Public health implications ==
In the United States in 2011, 42% of all unintended pregnancies ended in abortion, and 58% ended in birth (not including miscarriages). Regardless of the outcome of the pregnancy, unintended pregnancies have significant negative impacts on individual and public health.

=== Unintended births ===
Pregnancy, whether intended or unintended, has risks and potential complications. On average, unintended pregnancies that are carried to term result in poorer outcomes for the pregnant woman and for the child than do intended pregnancies.

==== Missed opportunities for preconception care ====
Unintended pregnancy usually precludes pre-conception counseling and pre-conception care. Patients with unintended pregnancies with preexisting medical comorbidities such as diabetes or autoimmune disease may not be able to optimize control of these conditions before becoming pregnant, which is often associated with poorer outcomes during the resulting pregnancy. Patients taking known teratogenic drugs, such as some of those used for epilepsy or hypertension, may not have the opportunity to change to a non-teratogenic drug regimen before an unintended conception. Unintended pregnancies preclude the chance to resolve sexually transmitted infections (STIs) before pregnancy; untreated STIs may be associated with premature delivery or later infection of the newborn.

==== Late initiation of prenatal care ====
Patients with unintended pregnancies enter prenatal care later. Unwanted pregnancies have more delay than mistimed. Patients who present late to prenatal care may also miss the opportunities for genetic testing of the fetus in the second trimester, which can identify abnormal fetuses and may be used in the decision to continue or terminate the pregnancy.

==== Maternal mental health ====
Women with an unintended pregnancy are more likely to develop depression during or after pregnancy.

==== Relationship stress ====
Women with unintended pregnancy are at increased risk of physical violence during pregnancy and report feeling greater relationship instability.

==== Substance use during pregnancy ====
A label on alcoholic drinks promoting zero alcohol during pregnancy

Women with unintended pregnancies are more likely to smoke tobacco, drink alcohol during pregnancy,, and binge drink during pregnancy, which results in poorer health outcomes. (See also: fetal alcohol spectrum disorder)

==== Increased rates of preterm birth and low birth weight ====
Unintended pregnancies are more likely to delivery prematurely, and have a greater likelihood of low birth weight, particularly for unwanted pregnancies.

==== Decreased bonding with infant ====
Unintended pregnancies have been associated with lower mother–child relationship quality. (See also maternal bond.)

==== Decreased breastfeeding ====
Women who deliver unintended pregnancies are less likely to breastfeed, which in itself has been associated with several improved health outcomes for both mothers and infants.

==== Increased rates of child neglect and abuse ====
Children born of unintended pregnancies have higher risk of child abuse and neglect.

==== Poorer long-term developmental outcomes ====
Children born of unintended pregnancies are less likely to succeed in school, with significantly lower test scores, more likely to live in poverty and need public assistance, and more likely to have delinquent and criminal behavior.

==== Adoption ====
Unintended pregnancies may result in the adoption of the infant, where the biological parents (or birth parents) transfer their privileges and responsibilities to the adoptive parents. Birth parents choose adoption when they do not wish to parent the current pregnancy, and they prefer to carry the pregnancy to term rather than ending the pregnancy through an abortion. In the United States alone, 135,000 children are adopted each year which represents about 3% of all live births. According to the 2010 census, there were 1,527,020 adopted children in the United States, representing 2.5 percent of all U.S. children. There are two forms of adoption: open adoptions and closed adoptions. Open adoption allows birth parents to know and have contact with the adoptive parents and the adopted child. In a closed adoption, there is no contact between the birth parents and adoptive parents, and information identifying the adoptive parents and the birth parents is not shared. However, non-identifying information (i.e., background and medical information) about the birth parents will be shared with the adoptive parents.

=== Induced abortions ===
Abortion, the voluntary termination of pregnancy, is one of the primary consequences of unintended pregnancy. A large proportion of induced abortions worldwide are due to unwanted or mistimed pregnancies. Unintended pregnancies result in about 42 million induced abortions per year worldwide. In the United States, approximately 42% of all unintended pregnancies ended in abortion. Over 92% of abortions are the result of unintended pregnancy. The U.S. states with the highest levels of abortions performed were Delaware, New York, and New Jersey, with rates of 40, 38, and 31 per 1,000 women, respectively. High rates were also seen in the states of Maryland, California, Florida, Nevada, and Connecticut, with rates of 25 to 29 per 1,000 women. The state with the lowest abortion rate was Wyoming, which had less than 1 per 1,000 women, followed by Mississippi, Kentucky, South Dakota, Idaho and Missouri with rates of 5 to 6 abortions per 1,000 women.

Abortion carries few health risks when performed in accordance with modern medical techniques. In higher resource areas where abortion is legal, it has lower morbidity and mortality for the pregnant woman than childbirth. However, where safe abortions are not available, abortion can contribute significantly to maternal mortality and morbidity. While decisions about abortion may cause some individuals psychological distress, some find a reduction in distress after abortion. There is no evidence of widespread psychological harm from abortion.

=== Maternal deaths ===
Over the six years between 1995 and 2000, there were an estimated 338 million pregnancies that were unintended and unwanted worldwide (28% of the total 1.2 billion pregnancies during that period). These unwanted pregnancies resulted in nearly 700,000 maternal deaths (approximately one-fifth of maternal deaths during that period). More than one-third of the deaths were from problems associated with pregnancy or childbirth, but the majority (64%) were from complications from unsafe or unsanitary abortion. Most of the deaths occurred in low resource regions of the world, where family planning and reproductive health services were less available. In certain countries with extreme prohibitions on abortions like El Salvador, Honduras, Nicaragua, Haiti, the Dominican Republic, Jamaica, Suriname, Egypt, Madagascar, Mauritania, Senegal, Sierra Leone, the Republic of Congo, Laos, the Philippines, Iraq forced women which have unintended pregnancies to commit suicide and its also contributed to maternal deaths.

=== Costs and potential savings ===
The public cost of unintended pregnancy is estimated to be about 11 billion dollars per year in short-term medical costs. This includes costs of births, one year of infant medical care, and costs of fetal loss. Preventing unintended pregnancy would save the public over 5 billion dollars per year in short-term medical costs. Savings in long-term costs and in other areas would be much larger. By another estimate, the direct medical costs of unintended pregnancies, not including infant medical care, were $5 billion in 2002. The Brookings Institution conducted research, and its results show that taxpayers spend more than $12 billion each year on unintended pregnancies. They also find that, if all unintended pregnancies were prevented, the resulting savings on medical spending alone would equal more than three-quarters of the federal FY 2010 appropriation for the Head Start and Early Head Start programs and would be roughly equivalent to the amount that the federal government spends each year on the Child Care and Development Fund (CCDF). Contraceptive use saved an estimated $19 billion in direct medical costs from unintended pregnancies in 2002.

== Prevention ==
Most unintended pregnancies result from not using contraception, or from using contraceptives inconsistently or incorrectly. Accordingly, prevention includes comprehensive sexual education, availability of family planning services, and increased access to a range of effective birth control methods.

=== Use of effective contraception ===
In the US, it is estimated that 52% of unintended pregnancies result from couples not using contraception in the month the woman got pregnant, and 43% result from inconsistent or incorrect contraceptive use; only 5% result from contraceptive failure, according to a report from the Guttmacher Institute.

Increasing the use of long-acting reversible contraceptives (LARCs) (such as IUD and contraceptive implants) decreases the chance of unintended pregnancy by decreasing the chance of incorrect use. Method failure is relatively rare with modern, highly effective contraceptives, and is much more of an issue when such methods are unavailable or not used. In the period from 2001 to 2008, there were notable increases in the use of long-acting methods among younger women. (See comparison of contraceptive methods). Available contraception methods include use of birth control pills, a condom, intrauterine device (IUD, IUC, IUS), contraceptive implant (Implanon or Nexplanon), hormonal patch, hormonal ring, cervical caps, diaphragms, spermicides, or sterilization. People choose to use a contraceptive method based on method efficacy, medical considerations, side effects, convenience, availability, friends' or family members' experience, religious views, and many other factors. Some cultures limit or discourage access to birth control because they consider it to be morally or politically undesirable.

While not yet available commercially, the future introduction of effective LARCs for men could have a positive effect on unintended pregnancies.

The CDC encourages men and women to formulate a reproductive life plan to help them avoid unintended pregnancies, improve the health of women, and reduce adverse pregnancy outcomes.

=== Improving access to effective contraception ===
Providing contraceptives and family planning services at low or no cost to the user helps prevent unintended pregnancies. Many of those at risk of unintended pregnancy have little income, so even though contraceptives are highly cost-effective, up-front cost can be a barrier. Subsidized family planning services improve the health of the population and saves money for governments and health insurers by reducing medical, education, and other costs to society.

In 2006, publicly funded family planning services (Title X, Medicaid, and state funds) helped women avoid 1.94 million unintended pregnancies, thus preventing about 860,000 unintended births and 810,000 abortions. Without publicly funded family planning services, the number of unintended pregnancies and abortions in the United States would be nearly two-thirds higher among women overall and among teens, and the number of unintended pregnancies among lower-class women would nearly double. The services provided at publicly funded clinics saved the federal and state governments an estimated $5.1 billion in 2008 in short-term medical costs. Nationally, every $1.00 invested in helping women avoid unintended pregnancy saved $3.74 in Medicaid expenditures that otherwise would have been needed.

In the United States, women who have an unintended pregnancy are more likely to have subsequent unplanned pregnancies. Providing family planning and contraceptive services as part of prenatal, postpartum, and post abortion care can help reduce recurrence of unintended pregnancy.

Outside of the United States, providing modern contraceptives to the 201 million women at risk of unintended pregnancy in low-income countries who do not have access to effective contraception would cost an estimated US$3.9 billion per year. This expenditure would prevent an estimated 52 million unintended pregnancies annually, preventing 1.5 million maternal and child deaths annually, and reduce induced abortions by 64% (25 million per year). Reduced illness related to pregnancy would preserve 27 million healthy life years, for $144 per year of healthy life.

=== Education on contraception use ===
Incorrect contraception use accounts for more than half of the unintended pregnancies in the US.Rates of incorrect contraception use are 6% higher for women under 25, and a younger age has also shown to be correlated with inconsistent use of oral contraception.

School-based interventions for adolescents (ages 19 or younger) include any form of education on contraception use in elementary, middle, or high school. This form of intervention provides significant effects on pregnancy, contraception use, correct use of contraception, and contraceptive effectiveness. Programs that covered both STD prevention and pregnancy, rather than just one topic alone, had more positive effects on teenagers' use of effective contraception, as did programs that had interactive elements when compared to programs that did not.

For young adults, ages 18-25, education on effective contraception use occurs in clinics and family planning centers and includes oral, written, and digital communication such as texting or email. Counseling, in addition to other education method, has the greatest effects on future use of effective contraception. This includes following up with a phone call, providing an educational packet, and using audiovisual tools while counseling.

== History ==
Early ways of preventing unintended pregnancy included withdrawal and various alternatives to intercourse; they are difficult to use correctly and, while better than no method, have high failure rates compared to modern methods. Various devices and medications thought to have spermicidal, contraceptive, abortifacient, or similar properties were also used.

Abortions have been induced to prevent unwanted births since antiquity, and abortion methods are described in some of the earliest medical texts. The degree of safety of early methods relative to the risks of childbirth is unclear.

Where modern contraceptives are not available, abortion has sometimes been used as a major way of preventing birth. For instance, in much of Eastern Europe and the former Soviet republics in the 1980s, the desired family size was small, but modern contraceptive methods were not readily available, so many couples relied on abortion, which was legal, safe, and readily accessible, to regulate births. In many cases, as contraceptives became more available, the rate of unintended pregnancy and abortion dropped rapidly during the 1990s.

Infanticide ('customary neonaticide') or abandonment (sometimes in the form of exposure) are other traditional ways of dealing with infants that were not wanted or that a family could not support. Opinions on the morality or desirability of these practices have changed throughout history.

In the 19th and 20th centuries, the desired number of pregnancies declined as reductions in infant and childhood mortality rates increased the probability that children would reach adulthood. Other factors, such as the level of education and economic opportunities for women, have also led to reductions in the desired number of children. As the desired number of children decreases, couples spend more of their reproductive lives trying to avoid unintended pregnancies.

=== US history ===
US birth rates declined in the 1970s. Factors that are likely to have led to this decline include: The introduction of the birth control pill in 1960, and its subsequent rapid increase in popularity; the completion of legalization of contraceptives in the 1960s and early 1970s; the introduction of federal funding for family planning in the 1960s and Title X in 1970; increased career and educational gains for women and its consequence of increased opportunity costs; and the legalization of abortion in 1973. The decline in the birth rate was associated with reductions in the number of children put up for adoption and a reduction in the rate of neonaticide.

- It is unclear to what extent the legalization of abortion increased the availability of the procedure. It is estimated that, before legalization, about one million abortions were performed annually. Before legalization, abortion was probably one of the most common criminal activities. Before legalization, an estimated 1,000 to 10,000 women died each year from complications of poorly performed abortions. Legalization was followed by a decrease in pregnancy-related deaths in young women, as well as a decrease in hospital admissions for incomplete or septic abortions that could be caused by an induced abortion performed by inexperienced practitioners.
- The infanticide rate during the first hour of life dropped from 1.41 per 100,000 from 1963 to 1972 to 0.44 per 100,000 from 1974 to 1983; the rate during the first month of life also declined, whereas the rate for older infants rose during this time.

The rate of unintended pregnancy declined significantly from 1987 until 1994, due to increased contraceptive use. Since then, the rate has remained relatively unchanged, as described above.

== See also ==
- Contraceptive mandate
- Demographic dividend
- Prevalence of teenage pregnancy
- Feminization of poverty
- Healthy People program
- International Conference on Population and Development
- Legalized abortion and crime effect
  - The Impact of Legalized Abortion on Crime
- Millennium Development Goals
- Miscarriage
- Nutrition and pregnancy
- Religious views on birth control
- Take Charge
