= Take Charge =

Government program

Take the Charge is a government program that provides free family planning and pregnancy prevention services to low-income residents of Washington state. The program expands Medicaid coverage for family planning services to individuals whose income is 200% or lower than the federal poverty level (FPL). By reducing the prevalence of unintended pregnancies, the goal of the program is to improve public health while reducing Federal and State Medicaid costs of unplanned pregnancies and their consequences. As of November 2007, there were 200 clinics in Washington providing the program's services.

== Services ==
Services available to eligible women include family planning counseling, annual examinations and pap smears, prescriptions for FDA-approved birth control methods including emergency contraception, and tubal ligation (sterilization) procedures. Services available to eligible men include FDA-approved over the counter contraceptives (such as male and female condoms and spermicide), annual contraceptive counseling sessions, and vasectomy (sterilization) procedures.

== Impact ==
The program began in July 2001 and has been utilized by over 400,000 men and women. In September 2006, the Washington Department of Social and Health Services published an evaluation of the program, entitled TAKE CHARGE: Final Evaluation, First Five Years: July 2001-June 2006.

According to the report:

- An estimated 22% of the women eligible under the waiver, who would have had an unintended pregnancy, remained pregnancy free.
- The proportion of clients using a more effective family planning method increased from 53.0% at enrollment to 70.6% one year later. The proportion that reported using abstinence in the prior two months remained steady at 11.3%.
- The number of Medicaid women (including Take Charge clients) who received services from family planning clinics increased from 22,850 during the baseline year to 85,607 in year one, 108,253 in year two, and 121,997 in year three.
- The number of Medicaid men (including Take Charge clients) receiving family planning services increased from 850 during the baseline year to 3548 in year one, 4384 in year two, and 5018 in year three.
