= Opill =

Brand of norgestrel

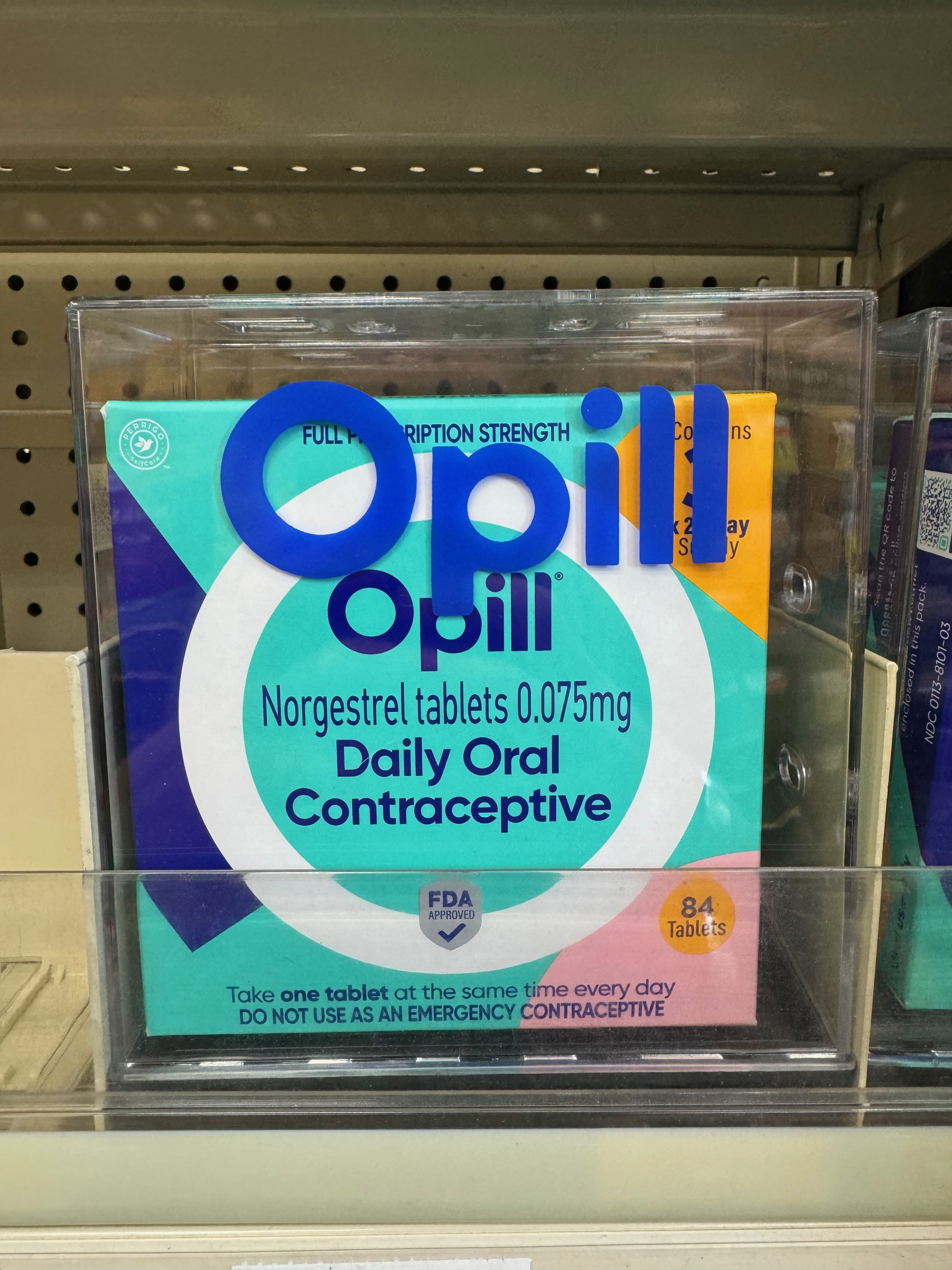
- Opill as sold at CVS
- Product type: Progestogen-only pill
- Current owner: Perrigo
- Country: United States
- Introduced: March 2024
- Website: www.opill.com

Opill is a birth control pill formulated from norgestrel, which works to thicken the cervical mucus and prevent pregnancy. Opill is manufactured by HRA Pharma, and, as of 2024, it is the only birth control pill available over the counter. It is the first over the counter birth control pill approved by the FDA; it was approved by them in 2023. Opill is solely intended to be used for pregnancy prevention. It is not intended for use in emergency situations or for prevention of sexually transmitted diseases or infections. Opill is marketed through social media and its partnership with the Women's National Basketball Association (WNBA).

== History ==
Opill was acquired by Perrigo during their acquisition of HRA Pharma, along with ellaOne and Hana, other over-the-counter emergency contraceptives.

Opill was approved by the U.S. Food and Drug Administration (FDA) for over-the-counter use on July 13, 2023. This approval was given to its manufacturer a year after their initial application for the prescription to over-the-counter switch.

Opill began sale in the United States in March 2024.

== Product ==
Opill is a progestin-only daily birth control pill, also known as a mini pill. It is approved for use in females who have started menstruating. The pill must be taken orally at the same time each day for optimal effectiveness; it is 98% effective when taken correctly and 91% effective with typical use. It is effective at preventing pregnancy 48 hours after the first dose.

Opill is intended solely as a contraceptive and does not function as emergency contraception, provide protection against sexually transmitted infections (STIs), or act as an abortion medication. Common side effects include irregular vaginal bleeding, headaches, dizziness, nausea, increased appetite, abdominal pain, bloating, and cramping.

== Marketing ==
Surveys were used to check that consumers could follow the instructions on dosing and understand the package labels. The colors of the packaging are designed to avoid gender-based stereotypes. The colors are mainly teal with accents of blue, purple, and pink.

Opill ran an advertising campaign using Snapchat to market the product to Generation Z.

In April 2024, Perrigo partnered with The Women's National Basketball Association to address issues important to the organization, such as reproductive health.

== Scientific foundation ==
Norgestrel is a progestin used in birth control pills, such as Opill, which contains a synthetic version of the naturally occurring hormone progesterone. The Opill contains 0.075mg of the active ingredient norgestrel, along with inactive ingredients including cellulose, FD&C Yellow 5, lactose, magnesium stearate, and polacrilin potassium.

The Opill primarily works by thickening the cervical mucus, making it harder for sperm to reach the egg. It can also prevent the release of eggs from the ovaries during some menstrual cycles and thins the uterine lining, creating a less hospitable environment for a fertilized egg to implant.

Progesterone prevents pregnancy by stopping ovulation. It works by inhibiting the development of ovarian follicles, preventing the release of an egg. This process is regulated by negative feedback on the hypothalamus, reducing the secretion of hormones like follicle-stimulating hormone (FSH) and luteinizing hormone (LH). Without follicle development, estradiol levels remain low and the LH surge necessary for ovulation is blocked, effectively preventing ovulation.

== Availability ==
Opill is currently available in the U.S. after it was approved by the FDA on July 13, 2023. The active ingredient in Opill, Norgestrel, was legalized for prescription use in 1973. However, it was discontinued by the manufacturer in 2005.

Currently, there are no legal restrictions placed on the Opill in the U.S.

World wide, over-the-counter birth control is legal in most of Africa, South America, and Asia. However, in most of Europe it still requires a prescription.
