= Workgroup for Electronic Data Interchange =

WEDI, pronounced "wee dee", is a not-for-profit user group in the United States for users of Electronic Data Interchange (EDI) in public and private healthcare. It is sometimes referred to by other names including some or all of the words Workgroup for Electronic Data Interchange.

By: Hipaasuite It was established to provide leadership and guidance to the healthcare industry on how to use and leverage its collective knowledge, expertise and information resources to improve the quality, affordability and availability of healthcare, via forums, conferences and online resources, especially in matters of conformance to EDI standards required by the Health Insurance Portability and Accountability Act, also known as HIPAA which was enacted by the U.S. Congress in 1996.

WEDI has regional affiliates in 27 US States and the Virgin Islands.

== History ==
In November 1991, the Workgroup for Electronic Data Interchange (WEDI) was established in response to the challenge from the Bush administration, specifically, Louis Sullivan MD, Secretary of HHS, to reduce administrative costs in the nation's health care system by up to 10%.

Joseph Brophy, President of Travelers Insurance Company, and Bernard Tresnowski, President of the Blue Cross and Blue Shield Association, agreed to establish and lead a voluntary, public-private task force, named WEDI, to develop an action plan to streamline health care administration by standardizing electronic communications across the health care and health insurance industry.

== Initial task force ==
The initial task force included members from the following organizations:

- The Travelers Insurance Company
- Blue Cross and Blue Shield Association
- Self-Insurance Institute of America
- American Medical Association
- ANSI ASC X12
- Mutual of Omaha
- American Hospital Association
- Drug Benefit Management
- United Healthcare Group
- American Clinical Laboratory Association
- Columbia Healthcare Corporation
- Medical Group Management
- American Nurses Association
- Aetna Life Insurance Company
- American Dental Association
- Health Insurance Association of America
- National Committee to Preserve Social Security and Medicare
- Health Technology Management, Inc
- National Association for Home Care
- Health Care Financing Administration
- American Association of Retired Persons
- American Health Information Management Association
- Blue Cross of California
- American Health Care Association
- Department of Income Maintenance State of Connecticut.

== WEDI 1992 report highlights ==
In July 1992, WEDI published a report that outlined the steps necessary to make electronic data interchange (EDI) a routine business practice for the health care industry by 1996. The Workgroup envisioned the entire health care industry transacting business electronically, under a nationwide set of coding and format standards for all transactions. The transaction records would be transmitted electronically, in a secure manner to protect privacy, over private and public interconnecting networks like the internet and intranet. In the year following the publication of the WEDI report, the health care industry made substantial gains with EDI implementation:

- ANSI ASC X12 approved the claim and eligibility standards for trial use
- The Insurance Subcommittee of ANSI ASC X12 formed new workgroups to develop other standards required by the health care industry
- HCFA initiated the use of Health Care Claim and Health Care Claim Payment/Advice standards and developed Efforts toward standardizing data content increased. EDI implementation guidelines for Medicare Part A Intermediaries and Part B Carriers consistent with the ANSI ASC X12 standards
- The private sector began developing EDI implementation guides
- EDI awareness and participation heightened as well as efforts to standardize data content

== WEDI 1993 report highlights ==
WEDI reconvened in 1993 to resolve remaining implementation obstacles and to:

- strengthen the understanding of and commitment to EDI among the health care industry, policymakers, and consumers by: developing a targeted plan for using industry resources to educate key audiences on EDI, encouraging participation in demonstration projects that prove EDI benefits and cost savings, and expanding membership to reflect more broadly the key constituencies affected by EDI
- work for enactment of preemptive federal confidentiality protection for individually identifiable health care information in an electronic environment
- develop a strategy to facilitate quick, industry-wide transition to EDI, including universal identifiers for patients, providers, and payors; health identification cards; coordination of benefits in electronic environments; and implementation guidance for data standards
- work with appropriate parties to ensure the health care industry can meet WEDI's target of universal adherence to uniform data content by 1996
- provide additional data to the industry on the cost benefits of EDI, using WEDI demonstration projects as a primary source
- monitor the industry's progress toward the use of data standards and EDI
- provide basic telecommunications requirements and promote WEDI's goal of clearinghouse accreditation by 1994
- serve as a resource to work cooperatively with the National Association of Insurance Commissioners and state governments to coordinate state and national efforts on administrative simplification.

== WEDI financials identify $42 billion in potential savings ==
WEDI expanded its financial analysis to encompass eleven health care transactions. Newly available data were added to estimate the potential savings for providers and to update the estimated savings for payors and employers. Additionally, the cost of implementing EDI was added to achieve a more comprehensive picture of EDI's financial impact on the health care industry.

WEDI's 1993 financial analyses concludes that combining the estimated implementation costs and the gross administrative savings potential, the cumulative net savings over the next six years (to the year 2000) is estimated to total over $42 billion. Although the estimated net savings may not translate directly to hard dollar savings for the nation's health care system, EDI savings will allow health care enterprises to reallocate resources from administrative activities to enhance quality, patient care, and customer service.

To achieve this large cost savings, WEDI's eleven Technical Advisory Groups developed the following major recommendations. These recommendations are summarized below according to the Technical Advisory Group that developed the recommendation:

- require specific and defined instructions through implementation guides to support uniform data content and coding structures (Standards Implementation and Uniform Data Content)
- develop a network architecture to support a broad array of applications, communications, access methods, protocols, and line speeds (Network Architecture and Accreditation)
- enact the model federal preemptive legislation drafted by WEDI to preserve confidentiality and privacy rights of individually identifiable health care information (Confidentiality and Legal Issues)
- identify unique, standard identification numbers to promote industry standardization and uniformity of health care data (Unique Identifiers for the Health Care Industry)
- develop and promote a comprehensive education and publicity work plan designed to provide standardized, economically affordable and geographically accessible education opportunities for all EDI constituents (Education and Publicity)
- develop an ASC X12 standard for data content and format for health identification cards (Health Identification Cards)
- continue demonstration projects that are ecumenical, identifiable to the public, demonstrate industry cooperation, leverage existing infrastructures, add something new, measure results, and meet aggressive time frames to demonstrate that technology is currently available to implement WEDI recommendations (Short-Term Strategies)
- clearly delineate state and federal roles for EDI implementation (State/Federal Role)
- provide ongoing analysis of the financial implications of EDI implementation (Financial Implications)
- automate the Coordination of Benefits process (Coordination of Benefits)
- use electronic environments and standardized data to improve fraud detection (Health Care Fraud Prevention and Detection).

== HIPAA ==
The leadership and guidance provided by WEDI to the healthcare industry on how to use and leverage its collective knowledge, expertise and information resources to improve the quality, affordability and availability of healthcare, via forums, conferences and online resources, especially in matters of conformance to EDI standards required by the Health Care Financing Administration (HCFA), now known as the Centers for Medicare and Medicaid Services (CMS) led to the development of Health Insurance Portability and Accountability Act (HIPAA) which was enacted by the U.S. Congress in 1996.

== Leadership ==
WEDI is currently led by Charles Stellar, the third CEO of the organization. Prior, Dr. Devin A. Jopp served as President & CEO from 2011 to 2015. Under Dr. Jopp's leadership, on the 20th anniversary of the original WEDI Report, an updated report entitled the "2013 WEDI Report" was released as a roadmap for the next generation of healthcare information exchange. Jim Schuping served as the organization's first CEO from 1996 to 2011.

== See also ==
- Electronic Data Interchange (EDI)
- Health Insurance Portability and Accountability Act (HIPAA)
- Centers for Medicare and Medicaid Services (CMS)
