= Healthy People program =

United States national health promotion goals

Healthy People is a program of a nationwide health-promotion and disease-prevention goals set by the United States Department of Health and Human Services. The goals were first set in 1979 "in response to an emerging consensus among scientists and health authorities that national health priorities should emphasize disease prevention". The Healthy People program was originally issued by the Department of Health, Education and Welfare. This first issue contained "a report announcing goals for a ten-year plan to reduce controllable health risks. In its section on nutrition, the report recommended diets with fewer calories; less saturated fat, cholesterol, salt, and sugar; relatively more complex carbohydrates, fish and poultry; and less red meat." Though this recommended diet consisted of more processed foods rather than fresh produce, the report advised for consumers to "be wary of processed foods". The goals were subsequently updated for Healthy People 2000, Healthy People 2010, Healthy People 2020 and Healthy People 2030.

Science based goals and objectives are reviewed, used and updated by the federal government, states, communities as well as other private institutions to combat and prevent health issues. Using the data collected, broad objectives are created in order to manage the direction of the population's health. These objectives have been used at a national level in industries such as housing and transportation, as well as at a state level as seen Iowa. The Iowa Department of Public Health utilized Healthy People 2020 to develop the Healthy Iowans state health plan. Progress towards objectives is updated regularly and can be seen on their website, where data has shown that between 2010 and 2014, 14 of the 26 indicators have met their targets as part of the Healthy People 2020 plan.

Healthy People 2010, started in January 2000 by the United States Department of Health and Human Services, was a set of nationwide health-promotion and disease-prevention goals to be achieved by the year 2010. Programs such as HealthCorps grew out of this plan.

== Healthy People 2010 ==
Healthy People 2010 "was developed through a broad consultation process, built on the best scientific knowledge and designed to measure programs over time". It is composed of 467 specific objectives organized into 28 focus areas, as well as two overarching goals. The two goals are:

- "increase quality and years of healthy life"
- "eliminate health disparities"

To track the Healthy People 2010 objectives, national data are being gathered from 190 sources. Ten "Leading Health Indicators" reflect major health concerns:

- physical activity
- overweight and obesity
- tobacco use
- substance abuse
- responsible sexual behavior
- mental health
- injury and violence
- environmental quality
- immunization
- access to health care

The campaign identifies 6 major factors (Social Identities) that contribute to disparities in the health of Americans:

- gender
- race or ethnicity
- education or income
- disability
- geographic location
- sexual orientation

== Healthy People 2010 and Healthy People 2020 ==
Healthy People 2010 expanded and updated the 1979 "Healthy People" and 1990 "Healthy People 2000" efforts; for example, the Healthy People 2000 goal of "reducing health disparities" was strengthened in Healthy People 2010 to "eliminate health disparities".

Healthy People 2020 expanded on Healthy People 2010 and was presented on 2 December 2010.

Healthy People 2020's program has 4 overarching goals,

- Higher quality and longer lives without preventable diseases, disabilities, injury and premature death
- Health equity, elimination of disparities and improvement of health in all demographic groups
- Creating social and physical environments that promote good health for all
- Promoting higher quality of life, healthy development and behaviors across every stage of life

As part of the new Healthy People 2020 approach, 12 topic areas were selected as leading health indicators (LHI's), which address determinants of health affecting quality of life, behaviors and healthy age development

- Access to Health Services
- Clinical Preventive Services
- Environmental Quality
- Injury and Violence
- Maternal, Infant and Child Health
- Mental Health
- Nutrition, Physical Activity and Obesity
- Oral Health
- Reproductive and Sexual Health
- Social Determinants
- Substance Abuse
- Tobacco

== Healthy People 2030 ==
Developed by the HHS Office of Disease Prevention and Health Promotion, Healthy People 2030 is the fifth iteration of the 1979 Surgeon General's initiative. The program launched in April 2020, and increases the focus on health equity, social determinants of health, and health literacy as well as adding a new focus on well-being.

The plan consists of three types of objectives; core, developmental and research. Core objectives are defined as high-priority objectives with an identified data source. Developmental objectives are defined as issues that are high-priority, however lack credible or reliable baseline data to provide support. Research objectives are defined as areas that present health or economic burdens, however research is needed to identify interventions based on evidence to improve health. The total number of objectives were reduced from over 1000 objectives in Healthy People 2020 to only around 360 objectives in Healthy People 2030 so that health practitioners and public health professionals can effectively address social determinants of health within the community.

Differences in objectives between Healthy People 2030 and Healthy People 2020 include a reduction in number of measurable objectives from the previous decade, increases in data sets, inclusion of e-cigarettes, and providing resources in order to adapt to emerging health crisis such as COVID-19. Furthermore, Healthy People 2030 includes 8 overall health and well-being measures (OHMs):

Well Being:

- Overall well-being

Health Life Expectancy:

- Life expectancy at birth without activity limitation
- Life expectancy at birth free of disability
- Life expectancy at birth in good or better health

Mortality and Health:

- Life expectancy at birth
- Free of activity limitation
- Free of disability
- Respondent-assessed health status

The focus of the Healthy People 2030 program is on upstream factors, or similar behaviors amongst populations that both effect people's health and their environments. For the first time in the Healthy people program history, Healthy People 2030 includes four objectives regarding adverse childhood experiences, or ACEs, such as poverty and abuse. These four objectives aim to reduce the number of young adults reporting 3 or more ACE's, increase proportion of children with symptoms of trauma who get treatment, increase the proportion of children who show resilience to challenges and stress and increase the number of early childcare educational settings that are informed regarding childhood traumas.

Healthy People 2030 also focuses on elderly populations. The Healthy People 2030's core objectives includes improving the health and quality of life for people with Alzheimer's disease and dementia.

- Increasing the proportion of older adults with dementia, or their caregivers, who know they have it
- Reducing the proportion of preventable hospitalizations in older adults with dementia
- Increasing proportion of adults with subjective cognitive decline (SCD) who have consulted a health care professional regarding their memory loss or confusion.
