= History of birth control =

Fertility vs contraception

The history of birth control, also known as contraception and fertility control, refers to the methods or devices that have been historically used to prevent pregnancy. Planning and provision of birth control is called family planning. In some times and cultures, abortion had none of the stigma which it has today, making birth control less important.

== Ancient world ==
=== Ancient Egypt ===
Birth control and abortion are well documented in Ancient Egypt. The Ebers Papyrus from 1550 BC and the Kahun Papyrus from 1850 BC have within them some of the earliest documented descriptions of birth control, the use of honey, acacia leaves and lint to be placed in the vagina to block sperm. Another early document explicitly referring to birth control methods is the Kahun Gynecological Papyrus from about 1850 BC. It describes various contraceptive pessaries, including acacia gum, which recent research has confirmed to have spermatocidal qualities and is still used in contraceptive jellies. Other birth control methods mentioned in the papyrus include the application of gummy substances to cover the "mouth of the womb" (i.e. the cervix), a mixture of honey and sodium carbonate applied to the inside of the vagina, and a pessary made from crocodile dung. Lactation (breast-feeding) of up to three years was also used for birth control purposes in ancient Egypt.

The Book of Genesis references withdrawal, or coitus interruptus, as a method of contraception when Onan "spills his seed" (ejaculates) on the ground so as to not father a child with his deceased brother's wife Tamar.

=== Ancient Greece and Rome ===
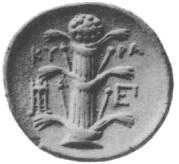
Ancient silver coin from Cyrene depicting a stalk of silphium

Silphium, a species of giant fennel native to north Africa, may have been used as an oral contraceptive in ancient Greece and the ancient Near East. The plant only grew on a small strip of land near the coastal city of Cyrene (located in modern-day Libya) and all attempts to cultivate it elsewhere resulted in failure. Silphium was primarily used for culinary purposes and its use as a contraceptive is far less documented than its use as a seasoning. Accounts of silphium's contraceptive effectiveness are probably greatly exaggerated. Possibly due to its supposed effectiveness and thus desirability, by the first century AD, it had become so rare that it was worth more than its weight in silver and, by late antiquity, it was fully extinct. Asafoetida, a close relative of siliphion, was also used for its contraceptive properties. Other plants commonly used for birth control in ancient Greece include Queen Anne's lace (Daucus carota), willow, date palm, pomegranate, pennyroyal, artemisia, myrrh, and rue. Some of these plants are toxic and ancient Greek documents specify safe dosages. Recent studies have confirmed the birth control properties of many of these plants, confirming for example that Queen Anne's lace has post coital anti-fertility properties. Queen Anne's lace is still used today for birth control in India.

According to Norman E. Himes, most methods of birth control used in antiquity were probably ineffective. The single most effective method of birth control known in antiquity was probably coitus interruptus. The ancient Greek philosopher Aristotle (c. 384–322 BC) recommended applying cedar oil to the womb before intercourse. Aristotle had no knowledge of how conception worked and he probably recommended this believing that the oil's smoothness would prevent conception. In actuality, this method may have sometimes been effective because the oil may have gummed up the external os and thereby reduced the motility of the sperm, but effectiveness would have been only occasional and highly variable. A Hippocratic text On the Nature of Women recommended that a woman who did not desire to conceive a child should drink a copper salt dissolved in water, which it claimed would prevent pregnancy for a year. This method is not only ineffective, but also dangerous, as the later medical writer Soranus of Ephesus (c. 98–138 AD) pointed out. Soranus attempted to list reliable methods of birth control. He took a rational approach to this, rejecting the use of superstition and amulets and instead prescribing common-sense mechanical methods such as vaginal plugs and pessaries using wool as a base covered in oils or other gummy substances. According to Himes, many of Soranus's methods were probably also ineffective.

=== China and India ===
In the 7th century BC, the Chinese physician Master Tung-hsuan documented both coitus reservatus and coitus obstructus, which prevents the release of semen during intercourse. However, it is not known if these methods were used primarily as birth control methods or to preserve the man's yang. In the medieval Tang Dynasty, Sun Simiao documented the "thousand of gold contraceptive prescription" for women who no longer want to bear children. This prescription, which was supposed to induce sterility, was made of oil and quicksilver heated together for one day and taken orally.

In India, Vatsyayana's classical text (2nd century AD) presented various contraceptive methods including coitus obstructus involving controlling the release of semen.

=== Ancient Americas ===
Many native plants were utilized and have thus been ingrained into Native American tradition as contraceptives. The Hopi and Tewa tribes are documented to have used the Indian paintbrush (Castilleja linariifolia) as a type of contraceptive. Many forms of the Lithospermum genus have been historically used by the Navajo and Shoshoni tribes. The bitter cherry plant (Prunus emarginata), corn lily (Veratrum californicum), and star-flowered lily-of-the-valley (Maianthemum stellatum) were used by a variety of different tribes as a form of contraceptive or sterility inducer.

Cinnamon has been used in ancient traditional Mexican medicine as an abortifacient and contraceptive. Nahua women used parts of the plants in the Bignonia and Hameilia genera and those of the shaving brush tree (Pseudobombax ellipticum) in their medical practices as well.

== Medieval and early modern period ==
=== Persia ===
In the late 9th to early 10th century, the Persian physician Muhammad ibn Zakariya al-Razi documented coitus interruptus, preventing ejaculation and the use of pessaries to block the cervix as birth control methods. He described a number of pessaries, including elephant dung, cabbages and pitch, used alone or in combination. During the same period Ali ibn Abbas al-Majusi (Persian) documented the use of pessaries made of rock salt for women for whom pregnancy may be dangerous. In the early 10th century the Persian Polymath Abu Ali al-Hussain ibn Abdallah ibn Sina (Persian), known in Europe as Avicenna, included a chapter on birth control in his medical encyclopedia The Canon of Medicine, listing 20 different methods of preventing conception. One such method of preventing contraception listed is otherwise identical to the ancient Egyptian method found in the Papyrus Kahun written 1,000 years earlier. However, it substitutes the ingredient of crocodile dung for that of elephant dung as he believed it to be of greater effectiveness.

=== South Asia ===
Indians used a variety of birth control methods since ancient times, including a potion made of powdered palm leaf and red chalk, as well as pessaries made of honey, ghee, rock salt or the seeds of the palasa tree. A variety of birth control prescriptions, mainly made up of herbs and other plants, are listed in the 12th century Ratirahasya ("Secrets of Love") and in the 15th century Ananga Ranga ("The Stage of the God of Love").

=== Europe ===
In medieval western Europe, any efforts to halt or prevent pregnancy were deemed immoral by the Catholic Church. Women of the time still used a number of birth control measures such as coitus interruptus, inserting lily root and rue into the vagina, and infanticide after birth.

Historian John M. Riddle has advanced the hypothesis that women in classical antiquity, the Middle Ages, and the Early Modern period used herbs to control fertility. Historian Etienne van de Walle has quoted Riddle as stating that "most women" in the Middle Ages knew that certain herbs and herbal products could be taken to induce an abortion in the early stages of pregnancy and that this knowledge was primarily shared amongst women, thus affording them "more control over their lives than we thought possible". Riddle has further hypothesized that "these drugs were perfected over centuries in a female culture of which males—who were doing the writing—had only a partial and imperfect understanding" and it is this shared folk wisdom amongst women that explains the relatively static population size in the West before the 18th century, rather than the high rate of infant mortality. Several historians have taken issue with this hypothesis: Gary Ferngren has noted the circumstantial nature of Riddle's evidence and concluded that the ideas remained "unproved and unlikely," while Helen King has written that Riddle makes claims about modern pharmacology that are not supported by his source materials. Demographer Gigi Santow also takes issue with the proposition, writing that it overemphasizes the role of herbs and stating that Riddle seeks "not so much to persuade as to convert."

On December 5, 1484, Pope Innocent VIII issued the Summis desiderantes affectibus, a papal bull in which he recognized the existence of witches and gave full papal approval for the Inquisition to proceed "correcting, imprisoning, punishing and chastising" witches "according to their deserts". In the bull, which is sometimes referred to as the "Witch-Bull of 1484", the witches were explicitly accused of having "slain infants yet in the mother's womb" (abortion) and of "hindering men from performing the sexual act and women from conceiving" (contraception). Famous texts that served to guide the witch hunt and instruct magistrates on how to find and convict so-called "witches" include the Malleus Maleficarum, and Jean Bodin's De la Demonomanie des Sorciers. The Malleus Maleficarum was written by the priest J. Sprenger (born in Rheinfelden, today Switzerland), who was appointed by Pope Innocent VIII as the General Inquisitor for Germany around 1475, and H. Institoris, who at the time was inquisitor for Tyrol, Salzburg, Bohemia and Moravia. The authors accused witches, among other things, of infanticide and having the power to steal men's penises.

Barrier methods such as the condom have been around much longer, but were seen primarily as a means of preventing sexually transmitted diseases, not pregnancy. Casanova in the 18th century was one of the first reported using "assurance caps" to prevent impregnating his mistresses. In 1909, Richard Richter developed the first intrauterine device made from silkworm gut which was further developed and marketed in Germany by Ernst Gräfenberg in the late 1920s.

== 19th century ==
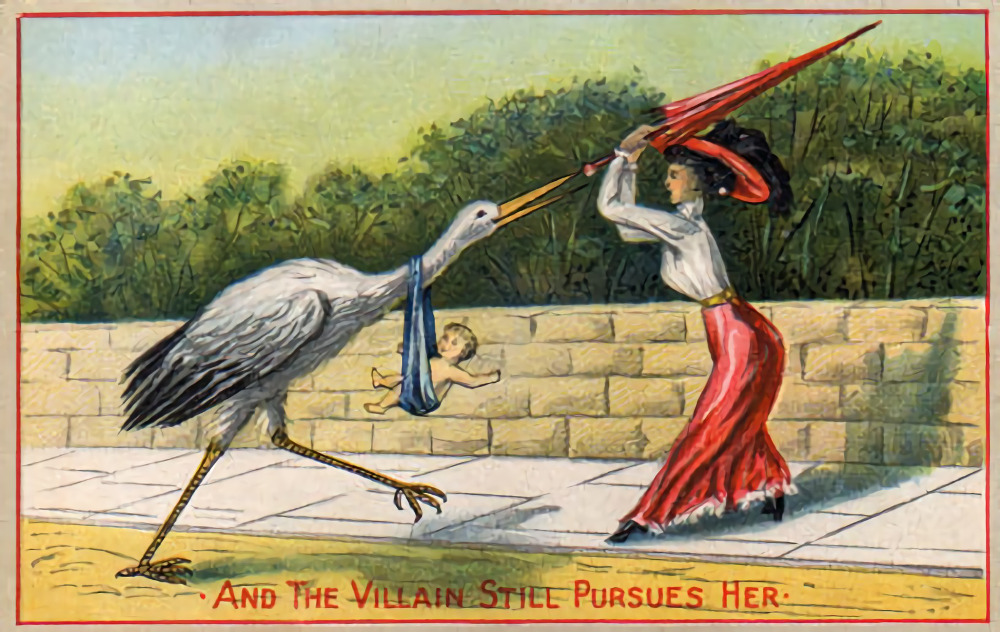
"And the villain still pursues her", a satirical Victorian era postcard

Birth control became a contested political issue in Britain during the 19th century. Thomas Malthus, an Anglican clergyman, statistician, and economist, argued in An Essay on the Principle of Population (1798) that population growth generally expanded exponentially in times and in regions of plenty until the size of the population quickly outstripped resources of subsistence. According to him, there were two types of checks that served to hold population within resource limits: positive checks, which raise the death rate; and preventive ones, which lower the birth rate. The positive checks include hunger, disease and war; the preventive checks, abortion, birth control, prostitution, postponement of marriage and celibacy. As a clergyman Malthus condemned birth control as "morally indefensible along with infanticide, abortion, and adultery." Malthus later elaborated his contention that human misery (e.g., hunger, disease, and war) was the principal limitation on population growth and would inevitably afflict society along with volatile boom-and-bust economic cycles. He suggested that paradoxically, efforts to alleviate poverty, such as workhouses, were futile and misguided since they would ultimately only result in subsequent growth in population. Instead Malthus recommended the preventive checks of sexual continence (chastity) and later marriages, which would produce both higher standards of living and greater economic stability without violating Christian morality.

Malthus's ideas came to carry great weight in British political debate in the 19th century, and they heavily influenced the movement toward the adoption of laissez-faire liberal capitalism. Malthusians were in favour of limiting population growth and began actively promoting birth control through a variety of groups. The term 'voluntary motherhood' was coined by feminists in the 1870s as a political critique of "involuntary motherhood" and as expressing a desire for women's emancipation. Advocates for voluntary motherhood disapproved of contraception, arguing that women should only engage in sex for the purpose of procreation and advocated periodic or permanent abstinence.

In contrast, the birth control movement advocated for contraception so as to permit sexual intercourse as desired without the risk of pregnancy. By emphasising "control", the birth control movement argued that women should have control over their reproduction - the movement was closely tied to the emerging feminist movement. The Malthusian League was established in 1877 and promoted the education of the public about the importance of family planning and advocated for the elimination of penalties against the promoters of birth control. It was initially founded during the "Knowlton trial" of Annie Besant and Charles Bradlaugh in July 1877. They were prosecuted for publishing Charles Knowlton's Fruits of Philosophy which explained various methods of birth control. Besant and Bradlaugh wrote that it was "...more moral to prevent the conception of children, than, after they are born, to murder them by want of food, air and clothing." The trial of Bradlaugh and Besant counter-productively triggered a wave of public interest in contraception, and book sales of Knowlton's book surged.

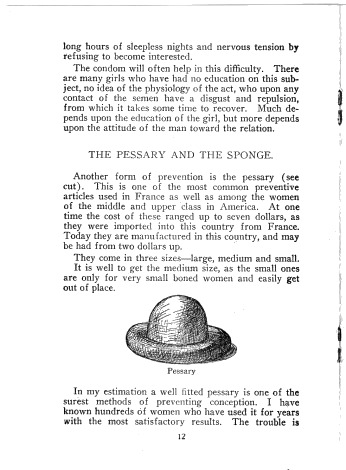
This page from Sanger's Family Limitation, 1917 edition, describes a cervical cap.

Starting in the 1880s, birth rates began to drop steadily in the industrialized countries, as women married later and families in urban living conditions increasingly favoured having fewer children. This trend was particularly acute in the United Kingdom, where birth rates declined from almost 35.5 births per 1,000 in the 1870s to about 29 per 1,000 by 1900. While the cause is uncertain, the 29% decline within a generation shows that the birth control methods Victorian women used were effective. Many women were educated about contraception and how to avoid pregnancy. While the rhythm method was not yet understood, condoms and diaphragms made of vulcanized rubber were reliable and inexpensive.

In the United States, contraception had been legal throughout most of the 19th century, but in the 1870s the Comstock Act and various state Comstock laws outlawed the distribution of information about safe sex and contraception and the use of contraceptives.

== 20th century ==
Margaret Sanger and Otto Bobsein popularised the phrase "birth control" in 1914. Sanger was mainly active in the United States, but had gained an international reputation by the 1930s. Sanger established a short lived birth control clinic in 1916, which was shut down just nine days later. Sanger was arrested for distributing contraceptives, and went on trial. Here as well, the publicity surrounding the arrest, trial, and appeal sparked birth control activism across the United States, and earned the support of numerous donors, who would provide her with funding and support for future endeavors. In 1917, she met Katharine McCormick, the heiress of the International Harvester Company fortune who also believed in the development of contraceptives. McCormick and Sanger became friends, with McCormick making financial contributions to Sanger's efforts, including funding the birth control pill research of Pincus and Rock in the 1950s. She went on to found the first birth control league in America in 1921.

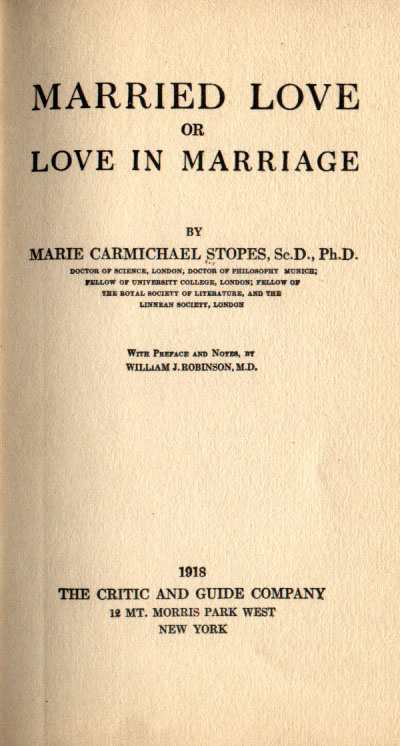
Cover of Marie Stopes's bestseller, Married Love.

The first permanent birth control clinic was established in Britain in 1921 by the birth control campaigner Marie Stopes, in collaboration with the Malthusian League. Stopes, who exchanged ideas with Sanger, wrote her book Married Love on birth control in 1918; - it was eventually published privately due to its controversial nature. The book was an instant success, requiring five editions in the first year and elevating Stopes to a national figure. Its success was followed up with Wise Parenthood: a Book for Married People, a manual on birth control, published later that year. She originally tried to publicize her message through the dissemination of pamphlets in the slums of East London, but this approach failed to work, as the working class was too mistrustful of well-intentioned meddlers at the time.

In 1921, after years of planning, Stopes and her husband Humphrey Verdon Roe opened the Mothers' Clinic in Holloway, North London. The clinic, run by midwives and supported by visiting doctors, offered mothers birth control advice and taught them the use of a cervical cap. Later in the same year, Stopes founded the Society for Constructive Birth Control and Racial Progress, a support organization for the clinic. Her clinic made contraception acceptable during the 1920s by framing it in scientific terms and gained an international reputation. The Malthusian League opened up a second clinic shortly afterward, but admitted that Stopes clinic had been the first in the British Empire, although the League emphasised that theirs was the first scientific clinic where birth control instruction was given under medical supervision (the medical officer was Norman Haire). These two clinics 'opened up a new period in the history of the movement aimed at the emancipation of women from their slavery to the reproductive function'. Although the clinic helped few patients in 1921 'the year was one of the most important in the whole history of birth control simply because of their very existence'.

Throughout the 1920s, Stopes and other feminist pioneers, including Dora Russell and Stella Browne, played a major role in breaking down taboos about sex and increasing knowledge, pleasure and improved reproductive health. Stopes was particularly influential in helping emerging birth control movements in a number of British colonies like India. In 1930 the National Birth Control Council was formed. Stella Browne's initial activism was limited to giving speaking tour across the country, providing information on birth control, women's health problems, problems related to puberty and sex education. In 1929 began to openly call for the legalization of abortion, during her lecture in front of the World Sexual Reform Congress in London. In April 1930 the Birth Control Conference assembled 700 delegates and was successful in bringing birth control and abortion into the political sphere - three months later, HM Ministry of Health allowed local authorities to give birth control advice in welfare centres.

In India, Mathematics Professor Raghunath Dhondo Karve, elder son of Maharshi Dhondo Keshav Karve, opened India's First Birth Control Clinic in 1921 in Mumbai (Bombay Presidency of British India), he also published a Marathi monthly magazine Samaj Swasthya (समाजस्वास्थ्य) starting from July 1927 until 1953.

The societal acceptance of birth control required the separation of sexual activity from procreation, making birth control a highly controversial subject in some countries at some points in the 20th century. Birth control also became a major theme in feminist politics; reproduction issues were cited as examples of women's powerlessness to exercise their rights. Starting in the 1930s and intensifying in the '60s and '70s, the birth control movement advocated for the legalisation of abortion and large scale education campaigns about contraception by governments. In a broader context birth control became an arena for conflict between liberal and conservative values, raising questions about family, personal freedom, state intervention, religion in politics, sexual morality and social welfare.

=== Late 20th century ===
Gregory Pincus and John Rock, with help from the Planned Parenthood Federation of America, developed the first birth control pills in the 1950s, which became publicly available in the 1960s. Pincus conducted large scale human testing for the pill in Puerto Rico in 1956, on largely lower-income women. The low-income women initially welcomed the trial, filling up the spots of the trial quickly, as many of them previously relied on abortion and sterilization to limit family size and wanted an alternative. Edris Rice-Wray was in charge of the trial, and noted around 17% of the participants reported serious side effects. She suggests that despite the effectiveness of preventing conception the dose was too high to be widely acceptable. However, her concerns were dismissed by Pincus and Rock as insignificant. Three deaths occurred during the trial, but no investigations took place to examine if the pill was associated with the deaths. Pincus and Rock would later be accused of being unethical as they failed to properly disclosed to the participants that they are involved in a clinical trial, instead advertising it as simply offering the contraceptive pill.

Medical abortion became an alternative to surgical abortion with the availability of prostaglandin analogs in the 1970s and the availability of mifepristone in the 1980s.

In 1965, the Supreme Court of the United States ruled in the case Griswold v. Connecticut that a Connecticut law prohibiting the use of contraceptives violated the constitutional "right to marital privacy". In 1972, the case Eisenstadt v. Baird expanded the right to possess and use contraceptives to unmarried couples.

In France, the 1920 Birth Law contained a clause that criminalized dissemination of birth-control literature. That law, however, was annulled in 1967 by the Neuwirth Law, thus authorizing contraception, which was followed in 1975 with the Veil Law. Women fought for reproductive rights and they helped end the nation's ban on birth control in 1965. In 1994, 5% of French women aged 20 to 49 who were at risk of unintended pregnancy did not use contraception.

The availability of contraception in the Republic of Ireland was illegal in the Irish Free State (later the Republic of Ireland) from 1935 until 1980, when it was legalised with strong restrictions, later loosened. This reflected Catholic teachings on sexual morality. In Italy women gained the right to access birth control information in 1970.

In the Soviet Union birth control was made readily available to facilitate social equality between men and women. Alexandra Kollontai, USSR commissar for public welfare, promoted birth control education for adults. In Eastern Europe and Russia, natality fell abruptly after the dissolution of the Soviet Union.

A well-studied example of governmental restriction of birth control in order to promote higher birth rates is from 1998 Ceaușescu-era Romania. The surge in births resulting from Decree 770 led to great hardships for children and parents, matched by an increase in illegal abortions.

=== 21st century ===
Although the scientific investigation of male birth control began in the 1930s, it was not until the 21st century that the topic garnered increasing attention.

== See also ==
- Birth control movement in the United States
