= Marie Stopes: Sexual Revolutionary =

1970 BBC TV play

- Genre: Biography; Comedy drama
- Based on: Marie and Halliday lawsuit from 1923
- Written by: R.W. Reid
- Starring: Bernard Archard; Anthony Bate; Alethea Charlton; Sonia Dresdel; Leo Genn; Llewellyn Rees; Peter Sallis; Robert Hardy
- Narrated by: Robert Hardy

Production
- Producer: David C Rea
- Running time: 65 Minutes
- Production company: BBC

Original release
- Network: BBC One
- Release: 25 June 1970

Marie Stopes: Sexual Revolutionary is a 1970 TV play which retells and explores a real life story from the year 1923 when Marie Stopes sued Halliday Sutherland over an attack. The film was produced by the BBC, broadcast only once on BBC One and shown on the 25 June 1970.

== Plot ==
Set in 1923, a British author named Marie Stopes is having quite the tumultuous life until one day she attempts to sue Dr Halliday Sutherland for libel, since she thinks he criticised her birth control clinic. A lawyer named Patrick Hastings comes to represent Stopes, and judge Ernest Charles comes to represented Dr Halliday Sutherland. At first Stopes loses the case then she won for an appeal at the Court of Appeal and then lost again in the House of Lords, but the case ends up generating huge publicity for everyone who views Stopes' case.

== Cast ==
- Bernard Archard as Serjeant Sullivan KC
- Anthony Bate as Doctor Halliday Sutherland
- Alethea Charlton as Marie Stopes
- Sonia Dresdel as Professor Louise McIlroy
- Leo Genn as Patrick Hastings KC
- Llewellyn Rees as Lord Chief Justice
- Peter Sallis as Ernest Charles KC
- Robert Hardy as Narrator

== Reception ==
The film was only broadcast once on BBC One on the 25 June 1970. The film is fully intact and survives in the BBC Archives. The film has unfortunately not been made available to watch at the British Film Institute or anywhere else.
