= Oriri =

1940 poem by Marie C. Stopes

- Author: Marie C. Stopes
- Language: English
- Publisher: Heinemann
- Publication date: September 1940
- Pages: 30

Oriri (1940) is a long poem by the birth control pioneer Marie C. Stopes, published by Heinemann as a short book. Its subject is love between a "He" and a "She", and it is written in semi-dramatic form, with other members of the cast including "Spirits of Air", "Spirits of Earth" and other "Elementals". Stopes writes in the "Argument" that prefaces the poem: "Interwoven in the tale is a crystallisation of most of what matters fundamentally in the sciences of geology and physiology, in the art of love, and in religion."

The poem brings together Stopes' scientific knowledge (she held a doctorate in paleobotany) with her theory of "erogamic love" (lifelong erotic pair-bonding), the latter of which was an important component of the theories that underlay her most influential and controversial publication, the sex manual Married Love (1918). In her biography of Stopes, Ruth Hall suggests that the poem was written when Stopes was in love with Keith Briant, a recent Oxford graduate who was considerably her junior (Stopes was just short of her sixtieth birthday when she wrote the poem).
