= The Story of John M'Neil =

1911 film by Halliday Sutherland

- Directed by: Halliday Sutherland
- Release date: 1911
- Running time: 22 minutes
- Country: United Kingdom
- Language: Silent

The Story of John M'Neil is Britain's first public health education film, produced in 1911 by Dr Halliday Sutherland. It is a silent film which dramatises a Scottish family living in slum housing and shows how tuberculosis was spread between family members, as well as how it was treated.

== Content and production ==
The film commences with this message:

"Before you see the picture it is necessary for all to realise that not only is tuberculosis CURABLE in its earlier stages, but above all it is PREVENTABLE."

This statement reflected Dr Sutherland's view that tuberculosis was primarily caused by infection, a view that was not universally accepted at the time. Mainstream medicine regarded susceptibility to tuberculosis as passed down by heredity; mainstream eugenicists regarded the tuberculous as "racially diseased".

The film depicts a "tuberculosis nest" - a tenement block in which the disease thrived. The opening scene shows Mrs M'Neil in her flat. She has consumption in an advanced stage. The family (John M'Neil, a printer, and their two daughters and son) arrive home for (presumably) the evening meal. The vectors of transmission of the disease are shown: sweeping up dust, coughing, spitting and sharing drinking vessels.

All members of the family are infected with TB and, when the oldest daughter visits the Tuberculosis dispensary, the "Edinburgh System" for the treatment, cure and prevention of the disease is applied. The remainder of the film shows the various treatments applied to people with different stages of the disease.

At the time the film was made, the hospitals in which the urban poor might be treated did not want them on the basis that they would expose their existing patients to TB. If the sufferer was out of work, one option might be the poor house, which had grave social stigma attached. "The story of John M'Neil" provided hope to those at threat and suffering from TB that they could be cured and that care would be provided in a humane manner.

The film depicts the "Edinburgh System" devised by Dr Robert Philip including an "open-air" school, open-air shelters, a sanatorium and a tuberculosis dispensary.

== Release and preservation ==
Several copies of the film were produced in the 35 mm format suitable for projection in cinemas. Only 22 minutes long, the film was aimed at mass audiences who regularly flocked to the new form of entertainment, the cinema.

Copies of the film were acquired by the National Film Library and are held in its collection.
