= Humphrey Verdon Roe =

British businessman, philanthropist and aircraft manufacturer

- Born: 18 April 1878; Manchester, England
- Died: 27 July 1949 (aged 71)
- Spouse: Marie Stopes (m. 1918; div. 1935)
- Children: Harry Stopes-Roe
- Relatives: Alliot Verdon Roe (brother)
- Military career
- Allegiance: United Kingdom
- Unit: Manchester Regiment
- Conflicts: Boer War; World War I (RFC); World War II (RAFVR)
- Other work: Businessman, Philanthropist, aircraft manufacturer

Humphrey Verdon Roe (18 April 1878 – 27 July 1949) was a British businessman, a philanthropist, aircraft manufacturer and the usually unacknowledged co-founder of Britain's first and most successful birth control clinic along with Marie Stopes, who became his wife. He was the father of the British philosopher Harry Stopes-Roe. Roe advocated for the racial superiority of the British upper classes and pushed birth control as a means of reducing birth rates among the poor and lower classes.Neo-Malthusians, Eugenists, and the Declining Birth-Rate in England, 1900-1918

== Early life ==
Roe was from Manchester, son of Edwin Roe and Annie Verdon, and younger brother of Alliot Verdon Roe. After leaving school he enlisted as an officer in the Manchester Regiment and served in the Boer War. In February 1902 he returned to Birmingham and took control of a company that manufactured webbing, Everard & Co., as his uncle who owned the firm had just died. He lifted the company back to commercial viability. In 1909 Roe invested in his brother Alliott's aeronautical inventions and a firm was eventually registered in 1913 under the name "A.V. Roe and Company", which is better known as Avro. Everard's most successful product was called "Bullseye Braces", which led to the "stock joke that 'Avro' biplanes were kept up by Bullseye Braces." Roe became managing director of the company, and "piloted the planes as often as his brother". The company was extremely successful and the brothers became rich, but then in 1917 they had a falling out and Roe withdrew from the company.

== Marie Stopes and the Mothers' Clinic ==
Before he met his wife, Roe had attempted to found a birth control clinic in Manchester, offering to finance St Mary's Hospital for the purpose. He had observed the effects of mothers in Manchester who had given birth to too many children and decided he could do something. The hospital declined the offer. In November 1917 Dr Binnie Dunlop, who was also interested in birth control, introduced Roe to Marie Stopes, who had just written a book called Married Love, but could not get it published. Later Roe decided to finance the book. Roe, who had recently joined the Royal Flying Corps, then left for the front.

In late March 1918 Roe injured his spine and broke an ankle when the aircraft in which he was an observer crashed after a bombing raid over an airfield in Germany. On his repatriation to London Stopes joined him on the day Married Love was published. They were married on 16 May 1918 and with the aid of his wife his desire to open a birth control clinic was realized on 17 March 1921 at 61, Marlborough Road, Holloway, North London. Stopes became the figurehead and Roe acted as the hardworking secretary. Together they worked tirelessly to keep the clinic running and expand their operations to other cities in Britain. Their relationship failed in the mid-1930s.

During World War II at the age of 61, Roe joined the Royal Air Force Volunteer Reserve and for a third time did his duty for his country. In 1949 he developed kidney trouble and died on 27 July aged 71.
