= Halliday Sutherland =

Scottish physician and writer (1882–1960)

Halliday Gibson Sutherland (24 June 1882 – 9 April 1960) was a Scottish medical doctor, writer, public-health pioneer, and outspoken critic of eugenics and neo-Malthusian population theory. Trained at the University of Edinburgh, he became known for his early work in tuberculosis prevention and treatment, including producing The Story of John M’Neil (1911), which is considered to be Britain’s first public-health education film. Sutherland’s medical career included running tuberculosis dispensaries, developing open-air treatment programmes for children, and publishing widely on public health. One of his books with the venerable Catholic publishing house Sheed & Ward was banned in Ireland, which increased its popularity everywhere.

A prolific author, Sutherland wrote both medical and autobiographical works, and he became a prominent figure in public debates over birth control and eugenics in the early 20th century. His opposition to the eugenics movement culminated in the notable libel action Stopes v Sutherland (1923), in which Marie Stopes sued him over his criticism of her birth-control clinic. Sutherland prevailed in the House of Lords, and the case remains an important episode in the history of medical ethics and reproductive politics.

Later in life, Sutherland travelled widely and continued writing, producing accounts of social conditions in Britain and Ireland, including early commentaries on mother-and-baby homes and institutional care. His work reflects a lifelong commitment to public health, social justice, and the belief that poverty arose from social and economic conditions rather than hereditary defects.

== Private life ==
Halliday Sutherland was born in Glasgow, Scotland on 24 June 1882, the son of John Francis Sutherland and his wife, Jane MacKay, daughter of John MacKay, a Free Church minister in Caithness. His father was physician to HM Prisons at the time of his birth, and later Depute Commissioner in Lunacy for Scotland. The family lived at 19 Roslea Drive in Glasgow. then moved to Edinburgh around 1895, living at 4 Merchiston Bank Avenue, close to the Edinburgh Asylum at Craig House. By 1905 the family were living at 3 Moston Terrace in the Mayfield district.

Halliday was educated at High School of Glasgow and Merchiston Castle School in Edinburgh. Shortly after the First World War he became a Roman Catholic. In 1920 he married Muriel Fitzpatrick. They lived at 5 Stafford Terrace Kensington in London and had six children. He died aged 77 in the Hospital of St John and St Elizabeth, St Marylebone, London on 19 April 1960.

== Career ==
Sutherland graduated from Edinburgh University with a MB, Ch B in 1906 and MD with honours in 1908. Following graduation he worked closely with Robert William Philip (later "Sir"), a "pioneer of modern anti-tuberculosis schemes". In 1911, Sutherland founded a tuberculosis clinic and an open-air school in the bandstand of Regent's Park in London and produced "The Story of John M'Neil", thought to be Britain's first cinema film on health education. During the First World War, Sutherland served in the Royal Navy (including service on RMS Empress of Britain) and in the Royal Air Force.

After the war he held the following posts:

- Physician to St Marylebone Hospital (later St Charles Hospital), Ladbroke Grove. Assistant physician to the Royal Chest Hospital.
- 1920–25 Deputy Commissioner (Tuberculosis) for the South-West of Britain and joined the medical service of the London County Council.
- 1941 Deputy Medical Officer of Health for Coventry
- 1943–1951 Director of the mass radiography centre in Birmingham

Sutherland was President of the Tuberculosis Society of Great Britain and an honorary physician to, and council member of, the Queen Alexandra Sanatorium Fund.

In 1954 he was made a Knight Commander of the Order of Isabel the Catholic and awarded the Pope John XXI Medal in 1955.

== Books ==
Sutherland was a writer of books and articles. His major works were:

- The Control and Eradication of Tuberculosis: A Series of International Studies by Many Authors (Contributing Editor) (1911)
- Pulmonary Tuberculosis in General Practice (1916)
- Birth Control: A Statement of Christian Doctrine against the Neo-Malthusians (1922)
- Birth Control Exposed (1925)
- The Arches of the Years (1932)
- A Time to Keep (1934)
- Laws of Life (1935)
- In My Path (1936)
- Tuberculin Handbook (1936)
- Lapland Journey (1938)
- Hebridean Journey (1939)
- Southward Journey (1942)
- Control of Life (1944)
- Spanish Journey (1948)
- Irish Journey (1956)

The Arches of the Years was Sutherland's most successful book. It was a best-seller for 1933, ran to 35 editions in English, and was translated into eight languages. G. K. Chesterton described Sutherland's writing as follows: "Dr. Halliday Sutherland is a born writer, especially a born story-teller. Dr. Sutherland, who is distinguished in medicine, is an amateur in the sense that he only writes when he has nothing better to do. But when he does, it could hardly be done better."

== Film ==
In 1911, Sutherland produced "The Story of John M'Neil", Britain's first public health education cinema film. The 22-minute film was produced for the then new and highly popular silent films shown in cinemas. It depicts various aspects of tuberculosis including the transmission of the disease between family members, the treatments of the various stages of the disease and Sir Robert Philip's "Edinburgh System" for the prevention, treatment and cure of tuberculosis.

== Public opposition of eugenics, Malthusianism and disputes with Marie Stopes ==
Sutherland publicly opposed the doctrines of eugenics and Malthusianism. This brought him into a bitter and public dispute with Dr Marie Stopes.

=== Eugenics ===
In the main, eugenists agreed with the sentiments of Dr John Haycraft who, in an 1894 speech on "Darwinism and Race Progress" at the Royal College of Physicians, had said the "preventative medicine is trying a unique experiment, and the effect is already discernible – race decay". The argument was that providing medical attention to those who would have perished in previous eras ran in the face of "the survival of the fittest". Race decay would surely result as the unfit, given succour, would live long enough to propagate their genes. Haycraft believed that the bulwark against this race decay was disease: “If we stamp out the Infectious Diseases we perpetuate Poor Types. It is a hard saying, but nonetheless a true one, that the bacillus tuberculosis is a friend of the race, for it attacks no healthy man or woman, but only the feeble.”

These views persisted into the new century and were reflected in the views of the Professor of Eugenics at London University, Karl Pearson, and by the President of the British Medical Association, Sir James Barr.

In "Tuberculosis, Heredity and Environment", Pearson said that the "importance of the discovery of Koch [of the tubercle bacillus] cannot be overrated," but he went on to say that this had led to a focus on infection as the cause of tuberculosis. His view was that there should have been a proper scientific inquiry as to the relative importance of the hereditary and environmental factors and of the liability to infection in the cause of the disease. Pearson had previously asserted that "the influence of environment is not one-fifth of heredity, and quite possibly not one-tenth of it," so he felt that by focussing on infection, the significant cause, heredity, was being ignored. Towards the end of his lecture, Pearson outlined the political ramifications of his findings:

"But Eugenists have something better to propose. No one can study the pedigrees of pathological states, insanity, mental defect, albinism, &c., collected by our laboratory, without being struck by the large proportion of tuberculous members – occasionally the tuberculous man is a brilliant member of our race – but the bulk of the tuberculous belong to stocks which we want ab initio to discourage. Everything which tends to check the multiplication of the unfit, to emphasize that the fertility of the physically and mentally healthy, will pro tanto aid Nature’s method of reducing the phthisical death-rate. That is what the Eugenist proclaims as the “better thing to do”, and £1,500,000 spent in encouraging healthy parentage would do more than the establishment of a sanatorium in every township."

Sir James Barr delivered the presidential address at the British Medical Association's 1912 conference. Recognising the progress that had been achieved in the field of medicine, he pointed out the dysgenic consequences: “We have successfully interfered with the selective death-rate which Nature employed in eliminating the unfit, but, on the other hand, we have made no serious attempt to establish a selective birth-rate so as to prevent the race being carried on by the least worthy citizens.”

Doctors had a major contribution to “raise up a vigorous, intelligent, enterprising, self-reliant and healthy race”, which “must be renewed from the mentally and physically fit...moral and physical degenerates should not be allowed to take any part in adding to the race.” He then turned his attention to tuberculosis:

“If we could only abolish the tubercle bacillus in these islands we would get rid of tuberculous disease, but we should at the same time raise up a race peculiarly susceptible to this infection—a race of hothouse plants which would not flourish in any other environment. We would thus increase at an even greater rate than we are doing at present, nervous instability, the numbers of insane and feeble-minded. Nature, on the other hand, weeds out those who have not got the innate power of recovery from disease, and by means of the tubercle bacillus and other pathogenic organisms she frequently does this before the reproductive age, so that a check is put on the multiplication of idiots and the feeble-minded. Nature's methods are thus of advantage to the race rather than to the individual.”

The first evidence of Sutherland's opposition to eugenics appeared in a November 1912 article in the British Medical Journal: "The Seed or the Soil in Tuberculosis". In it, he rebutted the view that tuberculosis was primarily a hereditary affliction and he provided the statistics to support his assertions. He spoke out again in September 1917 when he addressed the National Council of the Y.M.C.A. in a speech: "Consumption: Its Cause and Cure". He said that while "modern medicine [has]...found the cause, sources and cure of this disease", he identified that the barriers to its prevention were man-made. The obstacles were apathy, arrogance, ignorance, indifference, and eugenics.

"But why should you set out to prevent this infection and to cure the disease? There are some self-styled eugenists – whom you sir, from your pulpit have castigated as race-breeders with the soul of cattle-breeders – who declaim that the prevention of disease is not in itself a good thing. They say the efficiency of the State is based upon what they call 'the survival of the fittest'. This war has smashed their rhetorical phrase. Who now talks about the survival of the fittest, or thinks himself fit because he survives? I don't know what they mean. I do know that in preventing disease you are not preserving the weak, but conserving the strong. And I do know that those evil conditions which will kill a child within a few months of birth, and slay another when he reaches the teens, will destroy yet another when he comes to adult life."

Stopes had met Sir Francis Galton when a child and had been interested in eugenics at least since 1912 when she joined the Eugenics Education Society (she became a life fellow in 1921). In 1921, she founded the "Society for Constructive Birth Control and Racial Progress", in part because she was "annoyed that the (Eugenics Education) Society refused to place birth control prominently on its platform". The aim of the society was to "promote eugenic birth control". At the time the issues of birth control and eugenics were closely related: one historian has written: "in the interwar years birth control and eugenics were so intertwined as to be synonymous". Stopes stated the eugenic purpose of her clinic on the second day of the Stopes v. Sutherland libel trial in 1923. Under oath, she explained the purpose of the society that had been set up to run the clinic:

“The object of the Society is, if possible, to counteract the steady evil which has been growing for a good many years of the reduction of the birth rate just on the part of the thrifty, wise, well-contented, and the generally sound members of our community, and the reckless breeding from the C.3 end, and the semi-feebleminded, the careless, who are proportionately increasing in our community because of the slowing of the birth rate at the other end of the social scale. Statistics show that every year the birth rate from the worst end of our community is increasing in proportion to the birth rate at the better end, and it was in order to try to right that grave social danger that I embarked upon this work.”

Stopes outlined her eugenic vision in the final chapter of Radiant Motherhood: A Book for those Who Are Creating the Future, published in 1920. She outlined her "ardent dream" of "human stock represented only by well-formed, desired and well-endowed beautiful men and women". An obstacle to its accomplishment was "inborn incapacity" which lay "in the vast and ever increasing stock of degenerate, feeble-minded, and unbalanced who are now in our midst", a class of people who were "appallingly prolific". The solution was "a few very simple Acts of Parliament" for the compulsory sterilisation of "the miserable, the degenerate [and] the utterly wretched in mind and body". In March 1921, Stopes opened her birth control clinic in the east-end of London.

=== Birth Control: A Statement of Christian Doctrine Against the Neo Malthusians ===
In 1922 Sutherland wrote Birth Control: A Statement of Christian Doctrine Against the Neo Malthusians. It began:

“Birth control, in the sense of the prevention of pregnancy by chemical, mechanical or other artificial means, is being widely advocated as a sure method of lessening poverty and of increasing the physical and mental health of the nation. It is therefore advisable to examine these claims and the grounds on which these are based”.

What followed concerned politics as much as it concerned birth control. Sutherland attacked what he described as "the essential fallacies of Malthusian teaching": “Malthus did a greater and more evil thing. He forged a law of nature...that the masses should find no room at her feast; and that therefore our system of industrial capitalism was in harmony with the Will of God. Most comforting dogma!”

He said there was "no evidence whatever to prove that the population is pressing on the soil. On the contrary, we find ample physical resources sufficient to support the entire population, and we also find evidence of human injustice, incapacity, and corruption sufficient to account for the poverty and misery that exist in these countries". Sutherland argued that "organised poverty" arose when in the sixteenth century "the greater part of the land, including common land belonging to the poor, had been seized by the rich" and the acts of Parliament for the enclosure of common land between 1714 and 1820.

In conclusion, Sutherland foreshadowed the impact of a declining birth-rate that afflicts many developed nations today:

“Our declining birth-rate is a fact of the utmost gravity, and a more serious position has never confronted the British people. Here in the midst of a great nation, at the end of a victorious war, the law of decline is working, and by that law the greatest empires in the world have perished. In comparison with that single fact all other dangers, be they of war, of politics, or of disease, are of little moment. Attempts have already been made to avert the consequences by the partial endowment of motherhood and by a saving if infant life. Physiologists are now seeking among the endocrinous glands and the vitamines [sic] for a substance to assist procreation. “Where are my children?” was the question shouted yesterday from the cinemas. “Let us have children, children at any price,” will be the cry of to-morrow."

=== The Stopes v. Sutherland libel trial of 1923 ===
Birth Control is remembered today as the work that contained the passages that Stopes asserted were defamatory, which led to the Stopes v. Sutherland case.

Under the headings "Specially Hurtful to the Poor" and "Exposing the Poor to Experiment", Sutherland wrote:

"In the midst of a London slum a woman, who is a doctor of German philosophy (Munich), has opened a Birth Control Clinic, where working women are instructed in a method of contraception described by Professor McIlroy as 'The most harmful method of which I have had experience'. When we remember that millions are being spent by the Ministry of Health and by Local Authorities – on pure milk for necessitous expectant and nursing mothers, on Maternity Clinics to guard the health of mothers before and after childbirth, for the provision of skilled midwives, and on Infant Welfare Centres – it is truly amazing that this monstrous campaign of birth control should be tolerated by the Home Secretary. Charles Bradlaugh was condemned to jail for a less serious crime."

Charles Bradlaugh (and Annie Besant) had been tried in 1877 for publishing 'obscene literature'. They had published an American Malthusian tract in Britain. The original document was The Fruits of Philosophy which "advocated and gave explicit information about contraceptive methods". For the British version, Bradlaugh and Besant had added a subtitle: An Essay on the Population Question and a preface "we believe, with the Rev. Mr. Malthus, that population has a tendency to increase faster than the means of existence, and that some checks must therefore exercise control over population".

Stopes sued Sutherland for libel and the case commenced in the High Court on 21 February 1923. The defendants (Sutherland and his publisher) won. Stopes appealed, won, and was awarded damages of one hundred pounds. Sutherland appealed to the House of Lords and the case was heard for the third time on 21 November 1924. Sutherland won. Stopes was ordered to repay the one hundred pounds arising from the previous hearing, and to pay the defendant's costs in relation to the appeals to the Court of Appeal and the House of Lords.

A full account of the Stopes v. Sutherland trial is told in "Exterminating Poverty: The true story of the eugenic plan to get rid of the poor, and the Scottish doctor who fought against it" (2020) by Mark H Sutherland (in conjunction with Neil Sutherland).

A second case arose when, in January 1929, Stopes publication Birth Control News attacked Sutherland and this time it was he who took legal action against her for libel. He lost in the Court of Appeal.

=== Visit to the Mother and Baby Home in Tuam and to the Magdalene Laundry in Galway ===
In 1955, Sutherland again encountered controversy, when he travelled to Ireland to find material for a book. The result, Irish Journey, includes an account of Dr Sutherland's visit to the Mother and Baby Home in Tuam and the Magdalene Laundry in Galway in April 1955. To visit these institutions, Sutherland needed the permission of Michael Browne, the Bishop of Galway. He asked Bishop Browne: "Is there anything to hide?", later adding: "I want to find out how you treat unmarried mothers."

Permission was granted, on condition that Sutherland allowed his account to be censored by the Mother Superior of the Sisters of Mercy, who ran the institution. Accordingly, the account of his visit to the Laundry in "Irish Journey" was censored. In 2013, the publishers draft of "Irish Journey" was discovered in a cellar and the uncensored version was published in "The Suitcase in the Cellar" on hallidaysutherland.com.

Irish Journey caused ripples, which Sutherland described this way, in the preface to the 1958 American edition:

In 1955 I wrote Irish Journey and this book has been damned by faint praise from every newspaper critic in Ireland. I was not surprised, because all the critics have ignored my main criticism, which concerns the Irish secular clergy. In my opinion they have too much political power. They hold themselves aloof from their people, and are too fond of money.

In the bad old days, when Ireland was subject to the foreign power of England, the parish priest was probably the only educated man in an Irish village. The foreign power has been driven out, the people are better educated, but the parish priest is loath to relinquish his political power.

During my Irish holiday, I was assaulted by a total stranger in a Tipperary hotel. The incident was reported in all the Dublin papers, and when I returned to my Dublin hotel, the receptionist said to me, “Will you be writing about it?” I told her I would, and she replied, “That won’t be nice.” She was obviously afraid that the record of this incident would spoil Ireland as a show place.

Ireland is certainly a wonderful show place, and heaven may reflect Killarney; but as a Scotsman I think Loch Lomond, twenty miles from Glasgow, is more beautiful.

Another day a well-known man called at the hotel to see me. I met him in the lounge, but he asked me out to his car, I asked him where we were going and he said, ” Nowhere, but there were too many people in the lounge who might overhear what I am going to ask you, and that is not to mention me in your book.”

“And why not?”

“They wouldn’t like it.”

I know that he meant the Irish hierarchy, It is strange how the shadow of the hierarchy falls on the most unexpected places in the public life of Ireland.

If Ireland goes communist within the next ten years, I think the secular clergy will be to blame.

The “Catholic Medical Guardian” of London gave my book an excellent review and said that my account of the assault on myself in a Tipperary hotel recalled the best chapters in “Handy Andy”. But a copy of my book was sent to a nun in Dublin who replied, “This book should be burnt by the public hangman.”

I only hope that what I have written will be more appreciated in the clearer air in the United States of America.
