= Married Love =

Book about birth control and sex by Marie Stopes, first published in 1918

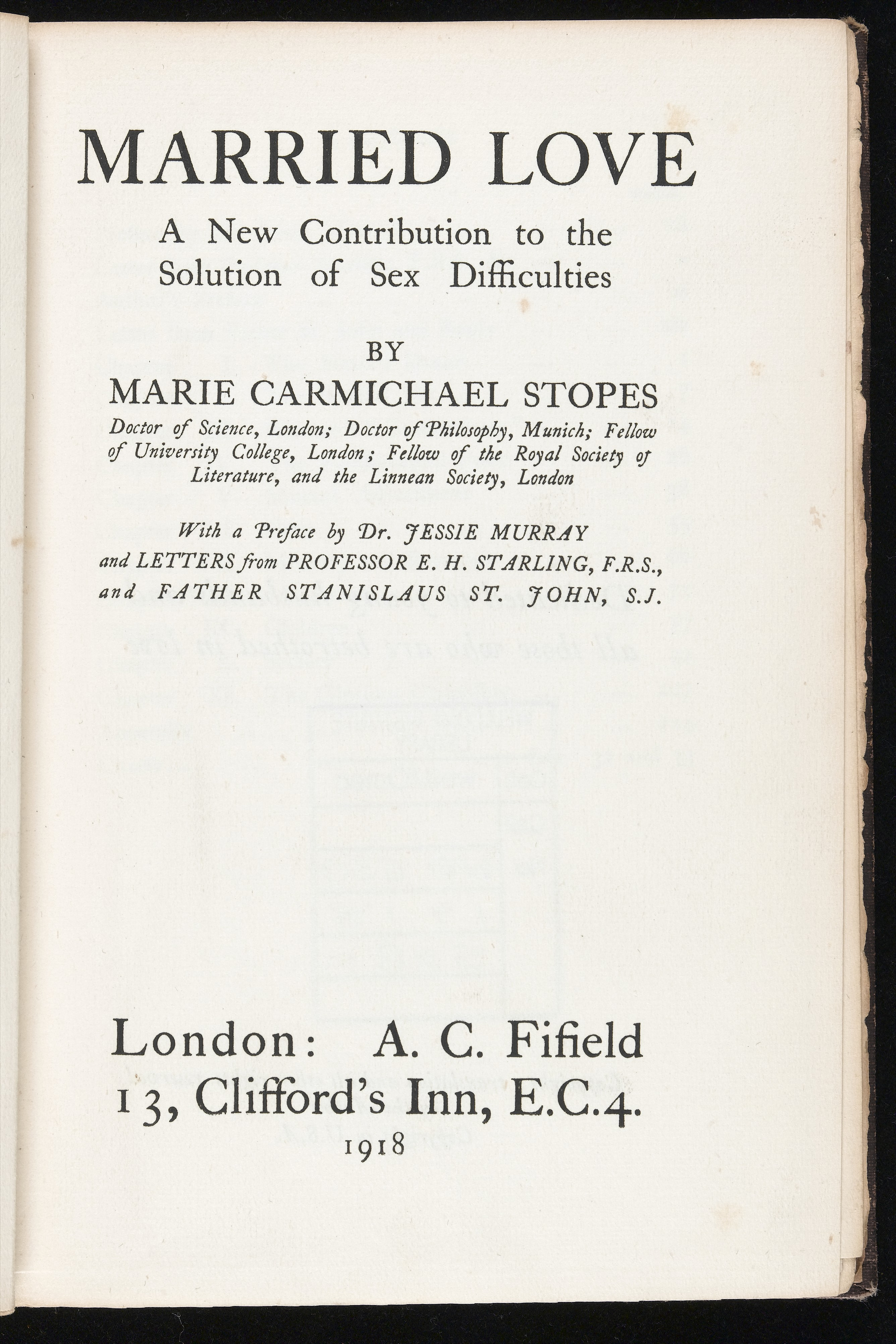
- Author: Marie Carmichael Stopes
- Language: English
- Publisher: Fifield & Co
- Publication date: 1918
- Publication place: United Kingdom; United States

Married Love or Love in Marriage is a book by British academic Marie Stopes. It was one of the first books openly to discuss birth control.

Before turning her attention to sexual relationships and birth control, Stopes had a significant career as an academic scientist and paleobotanist. She became Britain's youngest Doctor of Science in 1905 and her scientific training influenced the research skills that she used to work on Married Love.

The book begins by stating that "More than ever to-day are happy homes needed. It is my hope that this book may serve the State by adding to their number. Its object is to increase the joys of marriage, and to show how much sorrow may be avoided."

The preface states that it was geared toward teaching married couples how to have a happy marriage, including 'great sex' – and it was thus offering a service to 'the State' by reducing the number of people affected by failed marriages.

The central question is how can the "desire for freedom" and "physical and mental exploration" be balanced with the limits of monogamy and raising a family. The answer is not "in the freedom to wander at will" but a "full and perfected love". In Stopes' vocabulary, love means sex and "access to the knowledge of how to cultivate it".

== Publishing history ==
Stopes had already published books based upon her work as a research scientist. However, the publishers – both academic and mainstream – she approached for Married Love felt the subject matter too controversial and turned it down. Its publication was finally financed by Humphrey Roe, a Manchester businessman and birth control campaigner, whom Stopes would later marry. Roe paid the £200 required by the small publishing firm Fifield & Co. who published Married Love in March 1918.

The publication of Married Love was a turning point in Stopes's career. The publicity surrounding the book and requests from readers for help with birth control led Stopes to create a larger campaign. The book helped Stopes go from writing about sexual relationships to practical birth control work. The attention gained by Married Love later contributed to Stopes's practical birth control campaign. Stope's later founded the first British birth control clinic in a poor part of London, with the support of people. involved in the women's suffrage movement. Her campaign helped encourage the creation of more clinics in other parts of Britain.

It rapidly sold out, and was in its sixth printing within a fortnight.

The US Customs Service banned the book as obscene until April 6, 1931, when Judge John M. Woolsey overturned that decision. Woolsey was the same judge who in 1933 would lift the ban on James Joyce's Ulysses, allowing for its publication and circulation in the United States of America.

It was the first book to note that women's sexual desire coincides with ovulation and the period right before menstruation. The book argued that marriage should be an equal relationship between partners. Although officially scorned in the UK, the book went through 19 editions and sales of almost 750,000 copies by 1931.

It is also stated that Stope's work should be looked at in the context of the interwar birth control movement and the women's suffrage movement. Her research shows that some women who participated in the campaign for women's suffrage also participated in the campaign for birth control.

In 1935 a survey of American academics said Married Love was one of the 25 most influential books of the previous 50 years, ahead of Relativity by Albert Einstein, Interpretation of Dreams by Sigmund Freud, Mein Kampf by Adolf Hitler and The Economic Consequences of the Peace by John Maynard Keynes.

The book was the basis for a 1923 British silent film adaptation Married Love directed by Alexander Butler.

The 1923 film of Married Love also faced controversy because of its topic. It was originally titled Married Love, but the film attracted attention from the British Board of Film Censors and the Home Office because officials believed it promoted Marie Stopes's birth control campaign. The Home Office believed that birth control was an inappropriate subject for films because movies could reach a wide audience. Officials were really concerned that the film connected birth control with sexual happiness and believed that this knowledge could threaten public morality. Because of the controversy, the Home Office ordered that the original title could not be used, and the film was renamed Maisie's Marriage. Advertisements for the film used the censorship controversy to attract attention to the movie telling audiences that the original title could not be shown. Even though the film's message about birth control was presented indirectly, it showed how controversial Stopes's ideas about women's sexuality and family planning was during the 1920s.

== In popular culture ==
- British historical drama Downton Abbey:
  - Series 4, episode 4 (2013): Set in 1922, Housekeeper Mrs. Hughes (Phyllis Logan) says it is impossible for lady's maid Edna Braithwaite (Myanna Burring) to be pregnant because Edna owns a copy of Married Love, suggesting that she understands methods of birth control, and therefore could not be pregnant by Tom Branson (Allen Leech).
  - Series 5, episodes 2, 3, and 6 (2014): Set in 1924, Lady Mary (Michelle Dockery) is planning a pre-marital dalliance with Lord Gillingham (Tom Cullen). Based on her copy of Married Love, she instructs her lady's maid Anna Bates (Joanne Froggatt), to buy a contraceptive device (implied to be a cervical cap, Stopes's most advised method) in episode 2. After the dalliance, in episode 3, she asks Anna to hide the book and device in her own house for safekeeping. Anna's husband John Bates (Brendan Coyle) discovers the device and book in their cupboard in episode 6, and is hurt by the prospect that his wife is trying to prevent them having children; ownership of the device is later cleared up.
- In the 2012 BBC miniseries Parade's End episode 5, the character Valentine Wannop finds a copy of the book in the changing rooms at the school where she works as a games mistress. She discusses it with the rest of the school staff and decides to put it back, not confiscate it, to give the girls a chance to learn about sex before they are married.
- In The Giver of Stars by JoJo Moyes, Married Love is a "dirty book" being challenged at the packhorse library in the fictional town of Baileyville, Kentucky.
