= Binnie Dunlop =

Scottish writer, eugenicist (1874–1946)

Binnie Dunlop (3 August 1874 – 15 July 1946) was a Scottish medical doctor and eugenicist.

Dunlop, the son of a Glasgow doctor, studied medicine at the University of Glasgow, graduating M.B. (1898) and Ch.B. However, he never practiced medicine, instead studying social and economic questions.

He joined the Malthusian League – a British organisation which advocated the practice of contraception and the education of the public about the importance of family planning – in 1910, and was probably the author of the league's 1913 pamphlet Hygienic Methods of Birth Control. He held office in the Malthusian League as honorary secretary and treasurer, and was editor of The Malthusian from 1918 to 1921.

== Works ==
- National happiness under individualism. An explanation and solution of the poverty and riches problem, 1909
- (anon.) Hygienic methods of family limitation, 1913
- 'Over-population as a cause of war', in Eden and Cedar Paul, eds., Population and Birth-control: a symposium, 1917

== See also ==
- Eugenics in the United Kingdom
- List of University of Glasgow people
- List of Scottish writers
