= BCCA (disambiguation) =

BCCA may refer to:

- BC Cancer Agency
- Badruka College of Commerce and Arts
- Bergen County Christian Academy
- Birth Control Council of America
- Brewery Collectibles Club of America
- British Columbia Court of Appeal

== See also ==
- British Cycling; previously the British Cyclo-Cross Association
