= Birth control movement in the United States =

Social reform campaign beginning in the Progressive Era

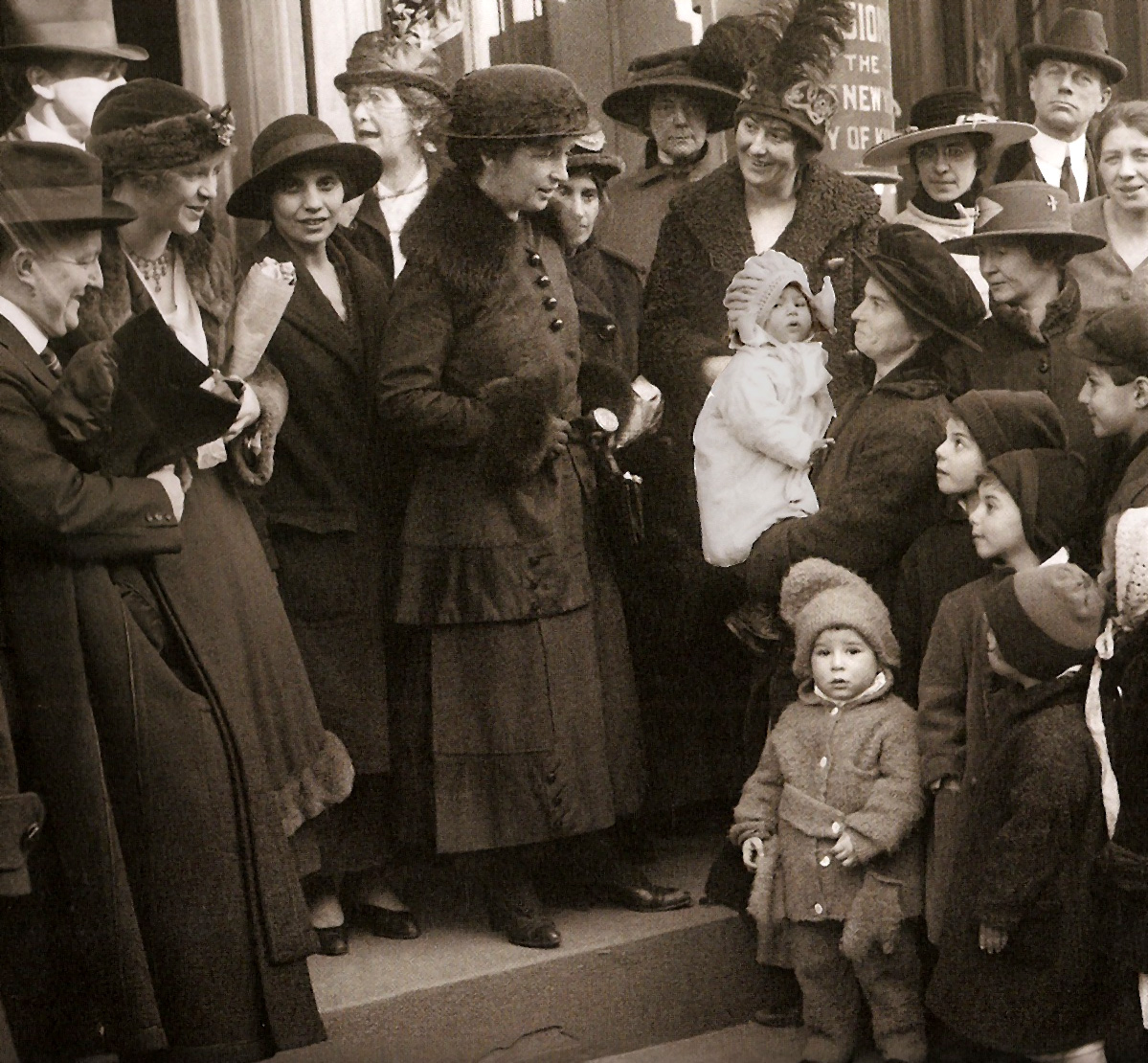
- Margaret Sanger, a birth control activist, her sister, Ethel Byrne, and Fania Mindell, leaving a courthouse in Brooklyn, New York, on 8 January 1917, during a trial for opening a birth control clinic
- Description: A reform movement to overturn anti-contraception laws
- Rights: Freedom of speech Reproductive rights Women's rights
- When: 1914 – c. 1945
- Leaders: Mary Dennett; Emma Goldman; Margaret Sanger
- Early texts: The Woman Rebel; Motherhood in Bondage; What Every Girl Should Know
- Organizations: National Birth Control League; American Birth Control League; Planned Parenthood
- Court cases: One Package; Griswold v. Connecticut; Eisenstadt v. Baird

Beginning in 1914, a social reform campaign aimed to increase the availability of contraception in the U.S. through education and legalization. The movement began when a group of political radicals in New York City, led by Emma Goldman, Mary Dennett, and Margaret Sanger, became concerned about the hardships that childbirth and self-induced abortions brought to low-income women. Since contraception was considered to be obscene at the time, the activists targeted the Comstock laws, which prohibited distribution of any "obscene, lewd, and/or lascivious" materials through the mail. Hoping to provoke a favorable legal decision, Sanger deliberately broke the law by distributing The Woman Rebel, a newsletter containing a discussion of contraception. In 1916, Sanger opened the first birth control clinic in the United States, but the clinic was immediately shut down by police, and Sanger was sentenced to 30 days in jail.

A major turning point for the movement came during World War I, when many U.S. servicemen were diagnosed with venereal diseases. The government's response included an anti-venereal disease campaign that framed sexual intercourse and contraception as issues of public health and legitimate topics of scientific research. This was the first time a U.S. government institution had engaged in a sustained, public discussion of sexual matters; as a consequence, contraception transformed from an issue of morals to an issue of public health.

Encouraged by the public's changing attitudes towards birth control, Sanger opened a second birth control clinic in 1923, but this time there were no arrests or controversy. Throughout the 1920s, public discussion of contraception became more commonplace, and the term "birth control" became firmly established in the nation's vernacular. The widespread availability of contraception signaled a transition from the stricter sexual mores of the Victorian era to a more sexually permissive society.

Legal victories in the 1930s continued to weaken anti-contraception laws. The court victories motivated the American Medical Association in 1937 to adopt contraception as a core component of medical school curricula, but the medical community was slow to accept this new responsibility, and women continued to rely on unsafe and ineffective contraceptive advice from ill-informed sources. In 1942, the Planned Parenthood Federation of America was formed, creating a nationwide network of birth control clinics. After World War II, the movement to legalize birth control came to a gradual conclusion, as birth control was fully embraced by the medical profession, and the remaining anti-contraception laws were no longer enforced.

== Contraception in the nineteenth century ==
=== Birth control practices ===
The practice of birth control was very common throughout the U.S. prior to 1914, when the movement to legalize contraception began. Longstanding techniques included the rhythm method, withdrawal, diaphragms, contraceptive sponges, condoms, prolonged breastfeeding, and spermicides. Use of contraceptives increased throughout the nineteenth century, contributing to a 50 percent drop in the fertility rate in the United States between 1800 and 1900, particularly in urban regions. The only known survey conducted during the nineteenth century of American women's contraceptive habits was performed by Clelia Mosher from 1892 to 1912. The survey was based on a small sample of upper-class women, and shows that most of the women used contraception (primarily douching, but also withdrawal, rhythm, condoms and pessaries) and that they viewed sex as a pleasurable act that could be undertaken without the goal of procreation.

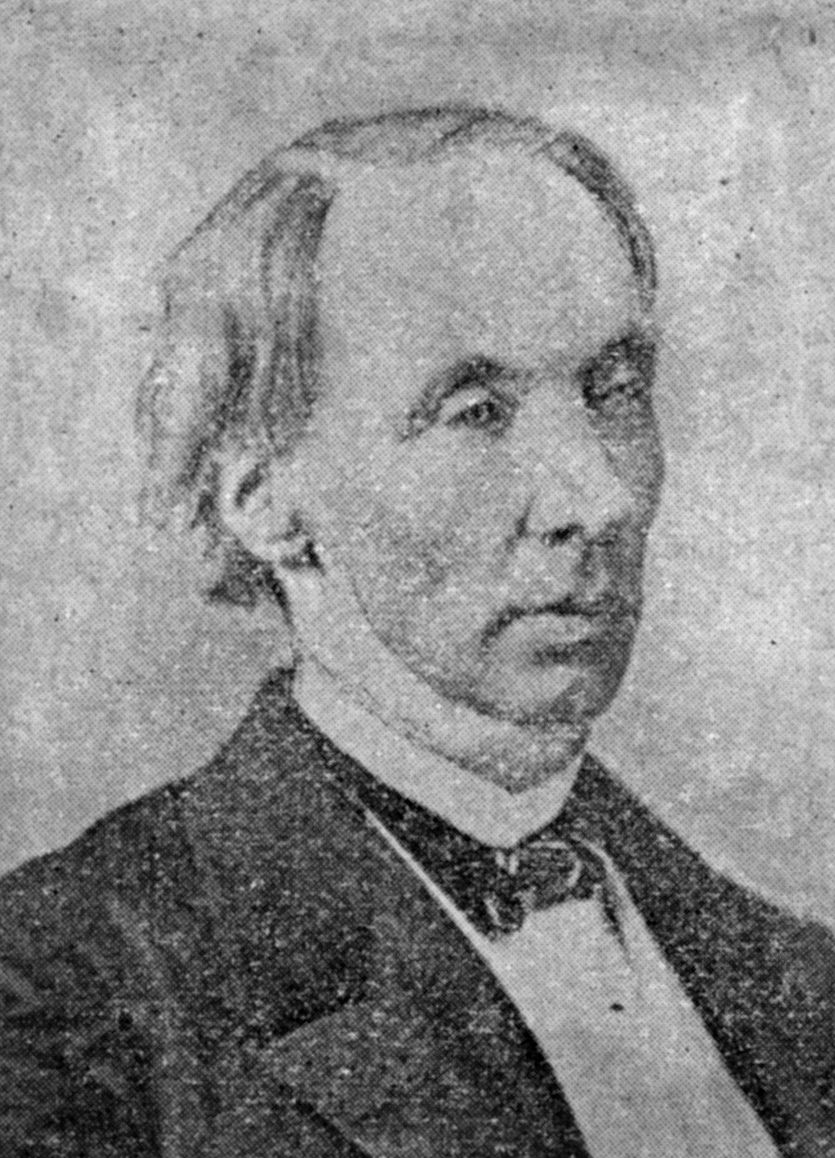
Robert Dale Owen wrote the first book on birth control published in the U.S.

Although contraceptives were relatively common in middle-class and upper-class society, the topic was rarely discussed in public. The first book published in the United States which ventured to discuss contraception was Moral Physiology; or, A Brief and Plain Treatise on the Population Question, published by Robert Dale Owen in 1831. The book suggested that family planning was a laudable effort, and that sexual gratification – without the goal of reproduction – was not immoral. Owen recommended withdrawal, but he also discussed sponges and condoms. That book was followed by Fruits of Philosophy: The Private Companion of Young Married People, written in 1832 by Charles Knowlton, which recommended douching. Knowlton was prosecuted in Massachusetts on obscenity charges, and served three months in prison. A third early American novel on both prevention of conception and abortion was the book The married woman's private medical companion: embracing the treatment of menstruation, or monthly turns, during their stoppage, irregularity, or entire suppression: pregnancy, and how it may be determined, with the treatment of its various diseases: discovery to prevent pregnancy, its great and important necessity where malformation or inability exists to give birth: to prevent miscarriage or abortion when proper and necessary, to effect miscarriage when attended with entire safety: causes and mode of cure of barrenness or sterility, written by A. M Mauriceau in the year 1847. Mauriceau was a doctor and his work was cited many times in early volumes of the Birth Control Review.

Birth control practices were generally adopted earlier in Europe than in the United States. Knowlton's book was reprinted in 1877 in England by Charles Bradlaugh and Annie Besant, with the goal of challenging Britain's obscenity laws. They were arrested (and later acquitted) but the publicity of their trial contributed to the formation, in 1877, of the Malthusian League – the world's first birth control advocacy group – which sought to limit population growth to avoid Thomas Malthus's dire predictions of exponential population growth leading to worldwide poverty and famine. By 1930, similar societies had been established in nearly all European countries, and birth control began to find acceptance in most Western European countries, except Catholic Ireland, Spain, and France. As the birth control societies spread across Europe, so did birth control clinics. The first birth control clinic in the world was established in the Netherlands in 1882, run by the Netherlands' first female physician, Aletta Jacobs. The first birth control clinic in England was established in 1921 by Marie Stopes, in London.

=== Anti-contraception laws enacted ===
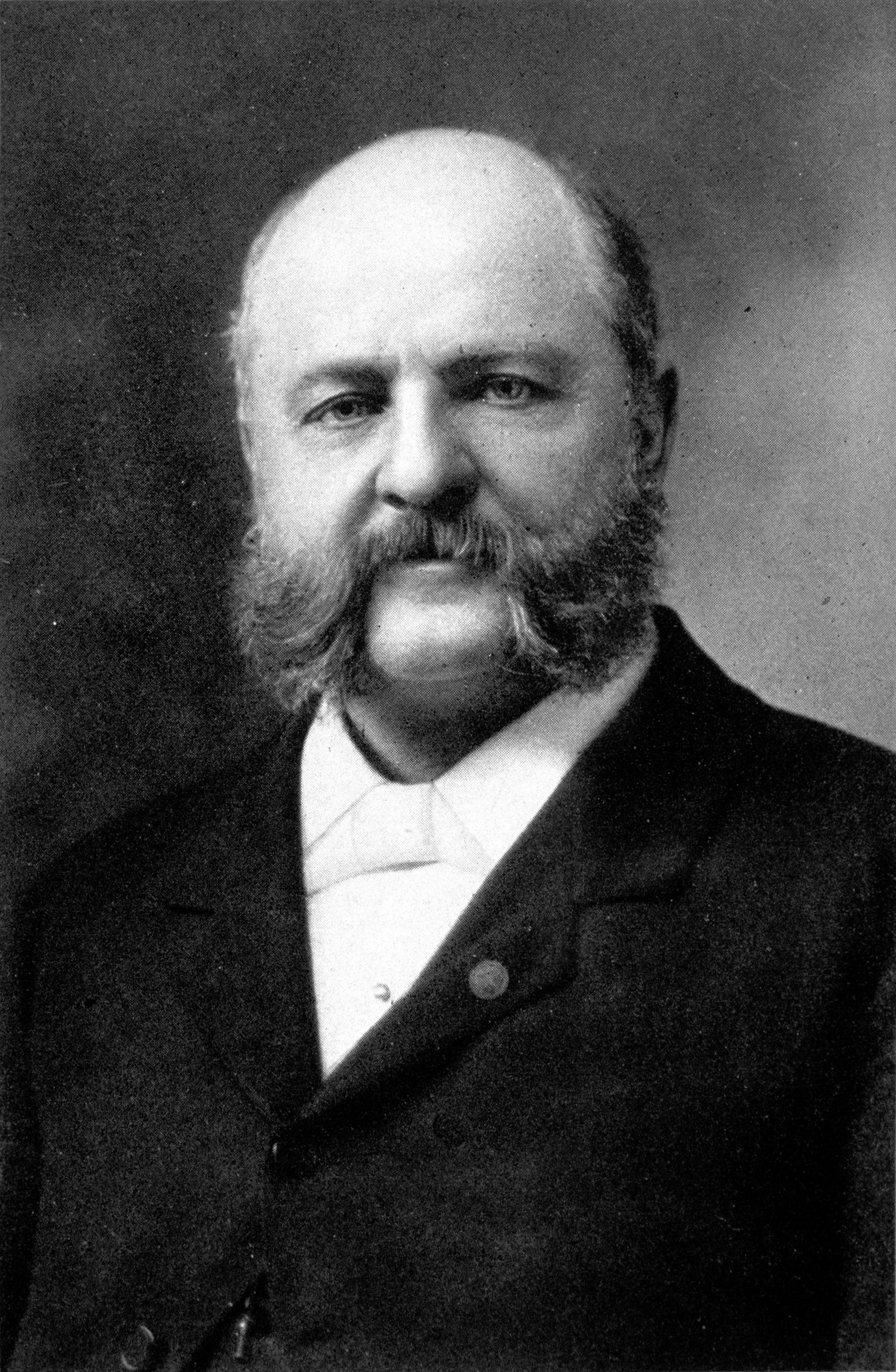
Anthony Comstock was responsible for many anti-contraception laws in the U.S.

Contraception was legal in the United States throughout most of the 19th century, but in the 1870s a social purity movement grew in strength, aimed at outlawing vice in general, and prostitution and obscenity in particular. Composed primarily of Protestant moral reformers and middle-class women, the Victorian-era campaign also attacked contraception, which was viewed as an immoral practice that promoted prostitution and venereal disease. Anthony Comstock, a postal inspector and leader in the purity movement, successfully lobbied for the passage of the 1873 Comstock Act, a federal law prohibiting mailing of "any article or thing designed or intended for the prevention of conception or procuring of abortion" as well as any form of contraceptive information. Many states also passed similar state laws (collectively known as the Comstock laws), sometimes extending the federal law by outlawing the use of contraceptives, as well as their distribution. Comstock was proud of the fact that he was personally responsible for thousands of arrests and the destruction of hundreds of tons of books and pamphlets.

Comstock and his allies also took aim at the libertarians and utopians who comprised the free love movement – an initiative to promote sexual freedom, equality for women, and abolition of marriage. The free love proponents were the only group to actively oppose the Comstock laws in the 19th century, setting the stage for the birth control movement.

The efforts of the free love movement were not successful and, at the beginning of the 20th century, federal and state governments began to enforce the Comstock laws more rigorously. In response, contraception went underground, but it was not extinguished. The number of publications on the topic dwindled, and advertisements, if they were found at all, used euphemisms such as "marital aids" or "hygienic devices". Drug stores continued to sell condoms as "rubber goods" and cervical caps as "womb supporters".

== Beginning (1914–1916) ==
=== Free speech movement ===
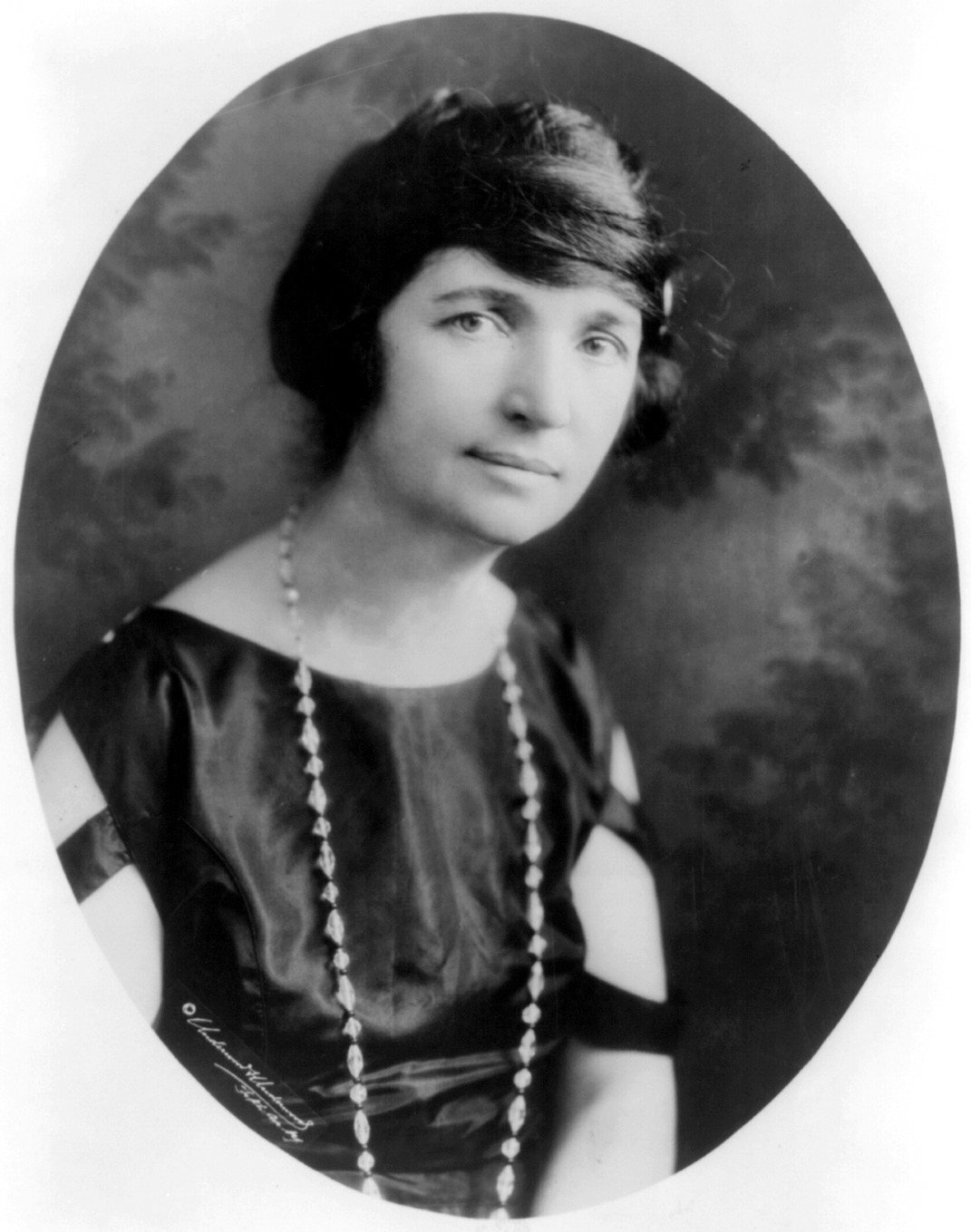
Margaret Sanger was a leader of the birth control movement.

At the turn of the century, an energetic movement arose, centered in Greenwich Village, that sought to overturn bans on free speech. Supported by radicals, feminists, anarchists, and atheists such as Ezra Heywood, Moses Harman, D. M. Bennett, and Emma Goldman, these activists regularly battled anti-obscenity laws and, later, the government's effort to suppress speech critical of involvement in World War I. Prior to 1914, the free speech movement focused on politics, and rarely addressed contraception.

Goldman's circle of radicals, socialists, and bohemians was joined in 1912 by a nurse, Margaret Sanger, whose mother had been through 18 pregnancies in 22 years, and died at age 50 of tuberculosis and cervical cancer. In 1913, Sanger worked in New York's Lower East Side, often with poor women who were suffering due to frequent childbirth and self-induced abortions. After one particularly tragic medical case, Sanger wrote: "I threw my nursing bag in the corner and announced ... that I would never take another case until I had made it possible for working women in America to have the knowledge to control birth." Sanger visited public libraries, searching for information on contraception, but nothing was available. She became outraged that working-class women could not obtain contraception, yet upper-class women who had access to private physicians could.

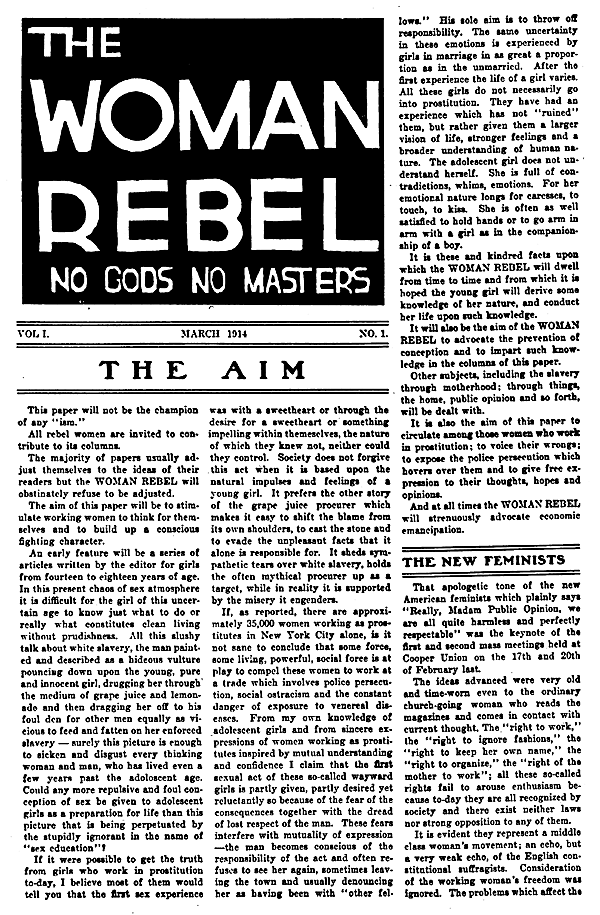
The first issue of The Woman Rebel, March 1914

Under the influence of Goldman and the Free Speech League, Sanger became determined to challenge the Comstock laws that outlawed the dissemination of contraceptive information. With that goal in mind, in 1914 she launched The Woman Rebel, an eight-page monthly newsletter which promoted contraception using the slogan "No Gods, No Masters", and proclaimed that each woman should be "the absolute mistress of her own body." Sanger coined the term birth control, which first appeared in the pages of Rebel, as a more candid alternative to euphemisms such as family limitation.

Sanger's goal of challenging the law was fulfilled when she was indicted in August 1914, but the prosecutors focused their attention on articles Sanger had written on assassination and marriage, rather than contraception. Afraid that she might be sent to prison without an opportunity to argue for birth control in court, she fled to England to escape arrest.

While Sanger was in Europe, her husband continued her work, which led to his arrest after he distributed a copy of a birth control pamphlet to an undercover postal worker. The arrest and his 30-day jail sentence prompted several mainstream publications, including Harper's Weekly and the New-York Tribune, to publish articles about the birth control controversy. Emma Goldman and Ben Reitman toured the country, speaking in support of the Sangers, and distributing copies of Sanger's pamphlet Family Limitation. Sanger's exile and her husband's arrest propelled the birth control movement into the forefront of American news.

=== Early birth control organizations ===
In the spring of 1915 supporters of the Sangers – led by Mary Dennett – formed the National Birth Control League (NBCL), which was the first American birth control organization. Throughout 1915, smaller regional organizations were formed in San Francisco, Portland, Oregon, Seattle, and Los Angeles.

Sanger returned to the United States in October 1915. She planned to open a birth control clinic modeled on the world's first such clinic, which she had visited in Amsterdam. She first had to fight the charges outstanding against her. Noted attorney Clarence Darrow offered to defend Sanger free of charge but, bowing to public pressure, the government dropped the charges early in 1916. No longer under the threat of jail, Sanger embarked on a successful cross-country speaking tour, which catapulted her into the leadership of the U.S. birth control movement. Other leading figures, such as William J. Robinson and Mary Dennett, chose to work in the background, or turned their attention to other causes. Later in 1916, Sanger traveled to Boston to lend her support to the Massachusetts Birth Control League and to jailed birth control activist Van Kleeck Allison.

=== First birth control clinic ===
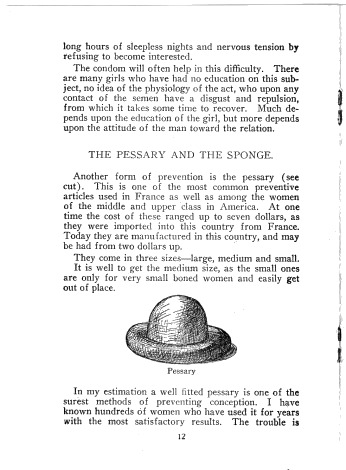
This page from the 1914 birth control pamphlet Family Limitation describes a cervical cap.

During Sanger's 1916 speaking tour, she promoted birth control clinics based on the Dutch model she had observed during her 1914 trip to Europe. Although she inspired many local communities to create birth control leagues, no clinics were established. Sanger therefore resolved to create a birth control clinic in New York that would provide free contraceptive services to women. New York state law prohibited the distribution of contraceptives or even contraceptive information, but Sanger hoped to exploit a provision in the law which permitted doctors to prescribe contraceptives for the prevention of disease. On October 16, 1916, she, partnering with Fania Mindell and Ethel Byrne, opened the Brownsville clinic in Brooklyn. The clinic was an immediate success, with over 100 women visiting on the first day. A few days after opening, an undercover policewoman purchased a cervical cap at the clinic, and Sanger was arrested. Refusing to walk, Sanger and a co-worker were dragged out of the clinic by police officers. The clinic was shut down, and it was not until 1923 that another birth control clinic was opened in the United States.

Sanger's trial began in January 1917. She was supported by a large number of wealthy and influential women who came together to form the Committee of One Hundred, which was devoted to raising funds for Sanger and the NBCL. The committee also started publishing the monthly journal Birth Control Review, and established a network of connections to powerful politicians, activists, and press figures. Despite the strong support, Sanger was convicted; the judge offered a lenient sentence if she promised not to break the law again, but Sanger replied "I cannot respect the law as it exists today." She served a sentence of 30 days in jail.

In protest to her arrest as well, Byrne was sentenced to 30 days in jail at Blackwell's Island Prison and responded to her situation with a hunger strike protest. With no signs of ending her demonstration anytime soon, Byrne was force fed by prison guards. Weakened and ill, Byrne refused to end her hunger strike at the cost of securing early release from prison. However, Sanger accepted the plea bargain on her sister's behalf, agreeing that Byrne would be released early from prison if she ended her birth control activism. Horrified, Byrne's relationship quickly eroded with her sister and, both forcefully and willingly, she left the birth control movement. Due to the drama of Byrne's demonstration, the birth control movement became a headline news story in which the organization's purpose was distributed across the country.

Other activists were also pushing for progress. Emma Goldman was arrested in 1916 for circulating birth control information, and Abraham Jacobi unsuccessfully tried to persuade the New York medical community to push for a change in law to permit physicians to dispense contraceptive information.

== Mainstream acceptance (1917–1923) ==
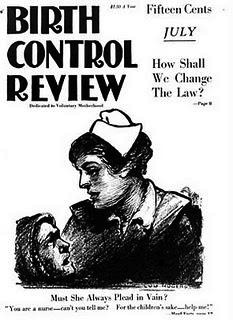
The Birth Control Review was published monthly from 1917 to 1940.

The publicity from Sanger's trial and Byrne's hunger strike generated immense enthusiasm for the cause, and by the end of 1917 there were over 30 birth control organizations in the United States. Sanger was always astute about public relations, and she seized on the publicity of the trial to advance her causes. After her trial, she emerged as the movement's most visible leader. Other leaders, such as William J. Robinson, Mary Dennett, and Blanche Ames Ames, could not match Sanger's charisma, charm and fervor.

The movement was evolving from radical, working-class roots into a campaign backed by society women and liberal professionals. Sanger and her fellow advocates began to tone down their radical rhetoric and instead emphasized the socioeconomic benefits of birth control, a policy which led to increasing acceptance by mainstream Americans. Media coverage increased, and several silent motion pictures produced in the 1910s featured birth control as a theme (including Birth Control, produced by Sanger and starring herself).

Opposition to birth control remained strong: state legislatures refused to legalize contraception or the distribution of contraceptive information; religious leaders spoke out, attacking women who would choose "ease and fashion" over motherhood; and eugenicists were worried that birth control would exacerbate the birth rate differential between "old stock" white Americans and "coloreds" or immigrants.

Sanger formed the New York Woman's Publishing Company (NYWPC) in 1918 and, under its auspices, became the publisher for the Birth Control Review. British suffragette activist Kitty Marion, standing on New York street corners, sold the Review at 20 cents per copy, enduring death threats, heckling, spitting, physical abuse, and police harassment. Over the course of the following ten years, Marion was arrested nine times for her birth control advocacy.

=== Legal victory ===
Sanger appealed her 1917 conviction and won a mixed victory in 1918 in a unanimous decision by the New York Court of Appeals written by Judge Frederick E. Crane. The court's opinion upheld her conviction, but indicated that the courts would be willing to permit contraception if prescribed by doctors. This decision was only applicable within New York, where it opened the door for birth control clinics, under physician supervision, to be established. Sanger herself did not immediately take advantage of the opportunity, wrongly expecting that the medical profession would lead the way; instead she focused on writing and lecturing.

=== World War I and condoms ===
The birth control movement received an unexpected boost during World War I, as a result of a crisis the U.S. military experienced when many of its soldiers were diagnosed with syphilis or gonorrhea. The military undertook an extensive education campaign, focusing on abstinence, but also offering some contraceptive guidance. The military, under pressure from purity advocates, did not distribute condoms, or even endorse their use, making the U.S. the only military force in World War I that did not supply condoms to its troops. When U.S. soldiers were in Europe, they found rubber condoms readily available, and when they returned to America, they continued to use condoms as their preferred method of birth control.

The military's anti-venereal disease campaign marked a major turning point for the movement: it was the first time a government institution had engaged in a sustained, public discussion of sexual matters. The government's public discourse changed sex from a secret topic into a legitimate topic of scientific research, and it transformed contraception from an issue of morals to an issue of public health.

In 1917, advocate Emma Goldman was arrested for protesting World War I and American military conscription. Goldman's commitment to free speech on topics such as socialism, anarchism, birth control, labor/union rights, and free love eventually cost her American citizenship and the right to live in the United States. Due to her commitment to socialist welfare and anti-capitalism, Goldman was associated with communism which led to her expulsion from the country during the First Red Scare. While World War I led to a breakthrough on American acceptance of birth control relating to public health, anti-communist WWI propaganda sacrificed one of the birth control movement's most dedicated members.

=== Legislative efforts ===
While an important birth control activist and leader, Mary Dennett advocated for a wide variety of organizations. Starting as a field secretary for the Massachusetts Women's Suffrage Association, she worked her way up to win an elected seat as a corresponding secretary for the National American Women's Suffrage Association. Dennett headed the literary department, undertaking assignments such as distributing pamphlets and leaflets. Following disillusionment with the NAWSA's organizational structure, Dennett, as described above, helped found the National Birth Control League. The NBCL took a strong stance against militant protest strategies and instead focused attention on legislation changes at both the state and federal level. During World War I, Mary Dennett focused her efforts on the peace movement, but she returned to the birth control movement in 1918. She continued to lead the NBCL, and collaborated with Sanger's NYWPC. In 1919, Dennett published a widely distributed educational pamphlet, The Sex Side of Life, which treated sex as a natural and enjoyable act. However, in the same year, frustrated with the NBCL's chronic lack of funding, Dennett broke away and formed the Voluntary Parenthood League (VPL). Both Dennett and Sanger proposed legislative changes that would legalize birth control, but they took different approaches: Sanger endorsed contraception but only under a physician's supervision; Dennett pushed for unrestricted access to contraception. Sanger, a proponent of diaphragms, was concerned that unrestricted access would result in ill-fitting diaphragms and would lead to medical quackery. Dennett was concerned that requiring women to get prescriptions from physicians would prevent poor women from receiving contraception, and she was concerned about a shortage of physicians trained in birth control. Both legislative initiatives failed, partly because some legislators felt that fear of pregnancy was the only thing that kept women chaste. In the early 1920s, Sanger's leadership position in the movement solidified because she gave frequent public lectures, and because she took steps to exclude Dennett from meetings and events.

=== American Birth Control League ===
We hold that children should be (1) Conceived in love; (2) Born of the mother's conscious desire; (3) And only begotten under conditions which render possible the heritage of health. Therefore, we hold that every woman must possess the power and freedom to prevent conception except when these conditions can be satisfied.

— American Birth Control League founding statement

Although Sanger was busy publishing the Birth Control Review during 1919 and 1920, she was not formally affiliated with either of the major birth control organizations (NBCL or VPL) during that time. In 1921 she became convinced that she needed to associate with a formal body to earn the support of professional societies and the scientific community. Rather than join an existing organization, she considered creating a new one. As a first step, she organized the First American Birth Control Conference, held in November 1921 in New York City. On the final night of the conference, as Sanger prepared to give a speech in the crowded Town Hall theater, police raided the meeting and arrested her for disorderly conduct. From the stage she shouted: "we have a right to hold [this meeting] under the Constitution ... let them club us if they want to." She was soon released. The following day it was revealed that Patrick Joseph Hayes, the Archbishop of New York, had pressured the police to shut down the meeting. The Town Hall raid was a turning point for the movement: opposition from the government and medical community faded, and the Catholic Church emerged as its most vocal opponent. After the conference, Sanger and her supporters established the American Birth Control League (ABCL).

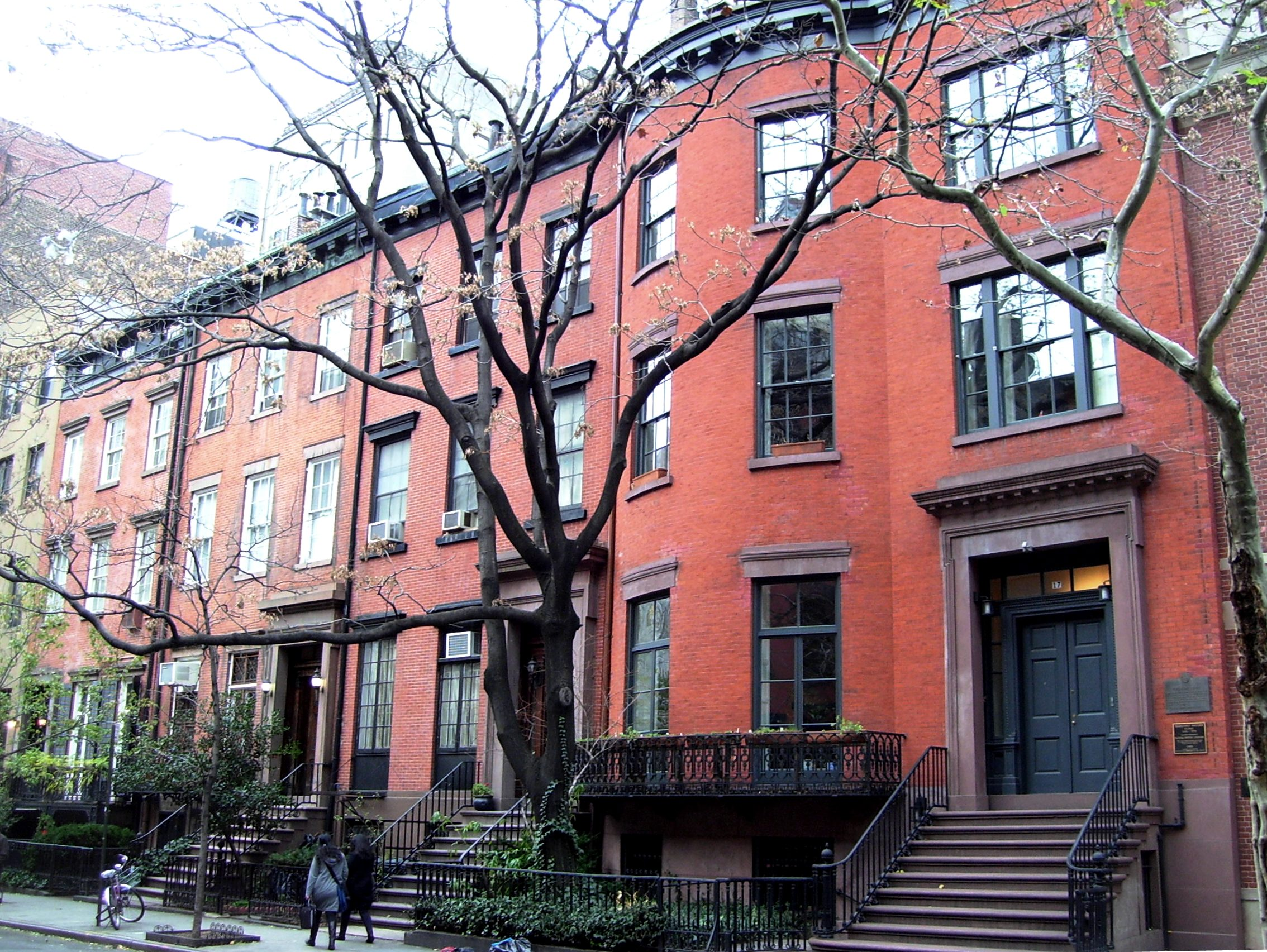
The Clinical Research Bureau operated from this New York building from 1930 to 1973.

=== Second birth control clinic ===
Four years after the New York Court of Appeals opened the doors for physicians to prescribe contraceptives, Sanger opened a second birth control clinic, which she staffed with physicians to make it legal under that court ruling (the first clinic had employed nurses). This second clinic, the Clinical Research Bureau (CRB), opened on January 2, 1923. To avoid police harassment the clinic's existence was not publicized, its primary mission was stated to be conducting scientific research, and it only provided services to married women. The existence of the clinic was finally announced to the public in December 1923, but this time there were no arrests or controversy. This convinced activists that, after ten years of struggle, birth control had finally become widely accepted in the United States. The CRB was the first legal birth control clinic in the United States, and quickly grew into the world's leading contraceptive research center.

== Progress and setbacks (1920s–1940s) ==
=== Widespread acceptance ===
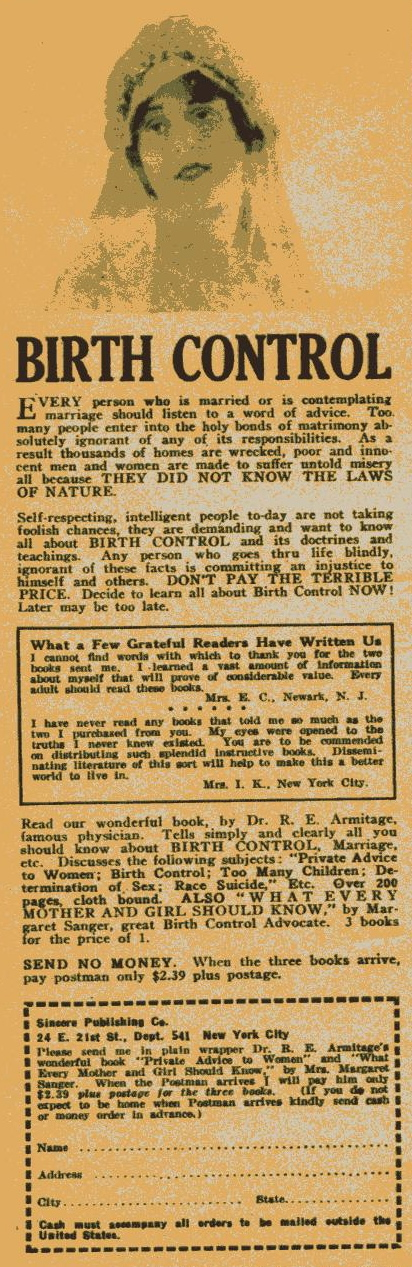
Advertisement from 1926

Following the successful opening of the CRB in 1923, public discussion of contraception became more commonplace, and the term "birth control" became firmly established in the nation's vernacular. Of the hundreds of references to birth control in magazines and newspapers of the 1920s, more than two-thirds were favorable. The availability of contraception signaled the end of the stricter morality of the Victorian era, and ushered in the emergence of a more sexually permissive society. Other factors that contributed to the new sexual norms included increased mobility brought by the automobile, anonymous urban lifestyles, and post-war euphoria. Sociologists who surveyed women in Muncie, Indiana in 1925 found that all the upper class women approved of birth control, and more than 80 percent of the working class women approved. The birth rate in America declined 20 percent between 1920 and 1930, primarily due to increased use of birth control.

=== Opposition ===
Although clinics became more common in the late 1920s, the movement still faced significant challenges: Large sectors of the medical community were still resistant to birth control; birth control advocates were blacklisted by the radio industry; and state and federal laws – though generally not enforced – still outlawed contraception.

The most significant opponent to birth control was the Catholic Church, which mobilized opposition in many venues during the 1920s. Catholics persuaded the Syracuse city council to ban Sanger from giving a speech in 1924; the National Catholic Welfare Conference lobbied against birth control; the Knights of Columbus boycotted hotels that hosted birth control events; the Catholic police commissioner of Albany prevented Sanger from speaking there; the Catholic mayor of Boston, James Curley, blocked Sanger from speaking in public; and several newsreel companies, succumbing to pressure from Catholics, refused to cover stories related to birth control. The ABCL turned some of the boycotted speaking events to their advantage by inviting the press, and the resultant news coverage often generated public sympathy for their cause. However, Catholic lobbying was particularly effective in the legislative arena, where their arguments – that contraception was unnatural, harmful, and indecent – impeded several initiatives, including an attempt in 1924 by Mary Dennett to overturn federal anti-contraception laws.

Dozens of birth control clinics opened across the United States during the 1920s, but not without incident. In 1929, New York police raided a clinic in New York and arrested two doctors and three nurses for distributing contraceptive information that was unrelated to the prevention of disease. The ABCL achieved a major victory in the trial, when the judge ruled that use of contraceptives to space births farther apart was a legitimate medical treatment that benefited the health of the mother. The trial, in which many important physicians served as witnesses for the defense, helped to unite the physicians with the birth control advocates.

=== Eugenics and race ===
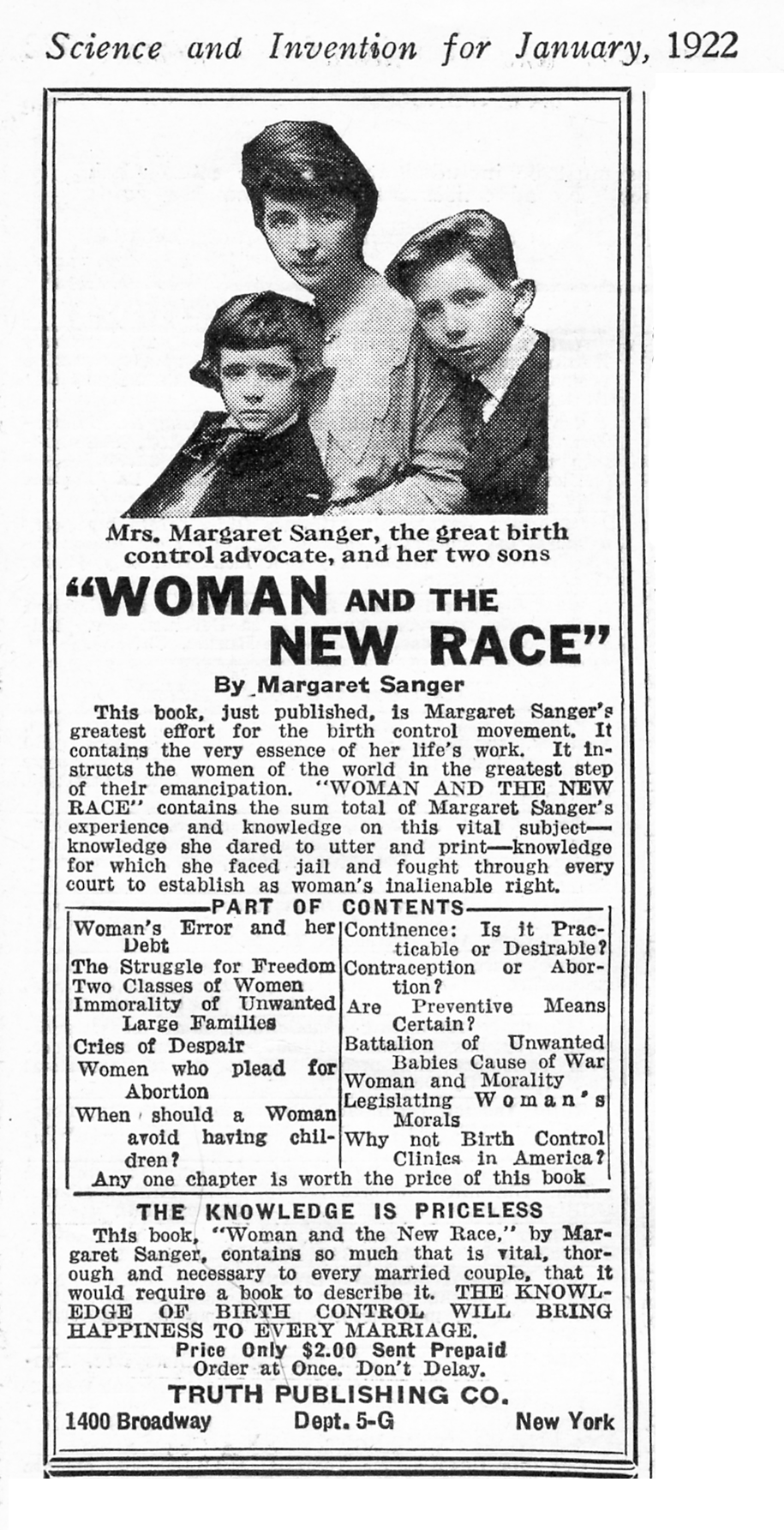
Sanger's 1920 book endorsed eugenics.

Before the advent of the birth control movement, eugenics had become very popular in Europe and the U.S., and the subject was widely discussed in articles, movies, and lectures. Eugenicists had mixed feelings about birth control: they worried that it would exacerbate the birth rate differential between "superior" and "inferior" races, but they also recognized its value as a tool to "racial betterment". Eugenics buttressed the birth control movement's aims by correlating excessive births with increased poverty, crime and disease. Sanger published two books in the early 1920s that endorsed eugenics: Woman and the New Race and The Pivot of Civilization. Sanger and other advocates endorsed negative eugenics (discouraging procreation of "inferior" persons), but did not advocate euthanasia or positive eugenics (encouraging procreation of "superior" persons). However, many eugenicists refused to support the birth control movement because of Sanger's insistence that a woman's primary duty was to herself, not to the state.

Like many white Americans in the U.S. in the 1930s, some leaders of the birth control movement believed that lighter-skinned races were superior to darker-skinned races. They assumed that African Americans were intellectually backward, would be relatively incompetent in managing their own health, and would require special supervision from whites. The dominance of whites in the movement's leadership and medical staff resulted in accusations of racism from blacks and suspicions that "race suicide" would be a consequence of large scale adoption of birth control. These suspicions were misinterpreted by some of the white birth control advocates as lack of interest in contraception.

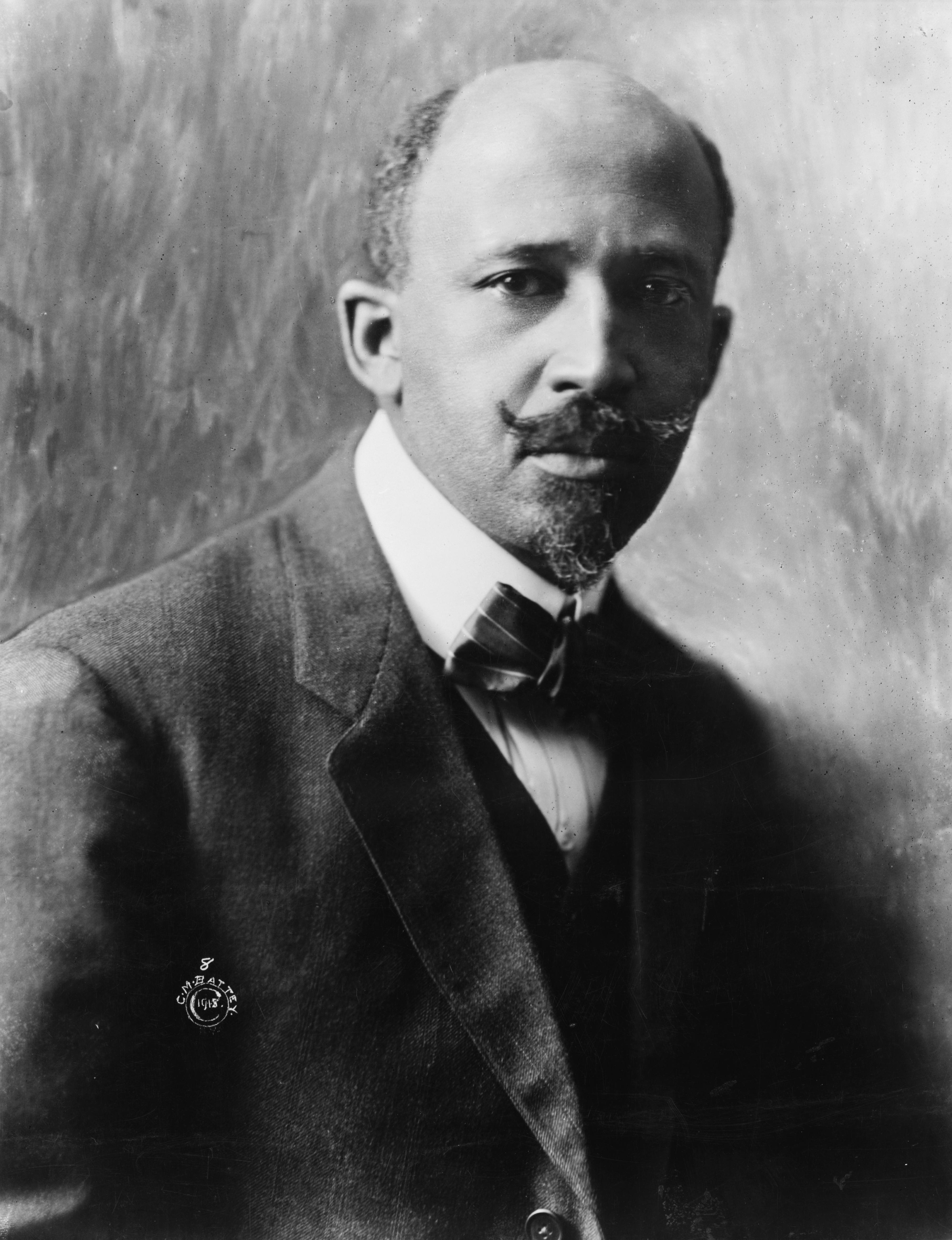
W. E. B. Du Bois served on the board of the Harlem birth control clinic.

In spite of these suspicions, many African-American leaders supported efforts to supply birth control to the African-American community. In 1929, James H. Hubert, a black social worker and leader of New York's Urban League, asked Sanger to open a clinic in Harlem. Sanger secured funding from the Julius Rosenwald Fund and opened the clinic, staffed with African-American doctors, in 1930. The clinic was guided by a 15-member advisory board consisting of African-American doctors, nurses, clergy, journalists, and social workers. It was publicized in the African-American press and African-American churches, and received the approval of W. E. B. Du Bois, co-founder of the National Association for the Advancement of Colored People (NAACP). In the early 1940s, the Birth Control Federation of America (BCFA) initiated a program called the Negro Project, managed by its Division of Negro Service (DNS). As with the Harlem clinic, the primary aim of the DNS and its programs was to improve maternal and infant health. Based on her work at the Harlem clinic, Sanger suggested to the DNS that African Americans were more likely to take advice from a doctor of their own race, but other leaders prevailed and insisted that whites be employed in the outreach efforts. The discriminatory actions and statements by the movement's leaders during the 1920s and 1930s have led to continuing allegations that the movement was racist.

=== Expanding availability ===
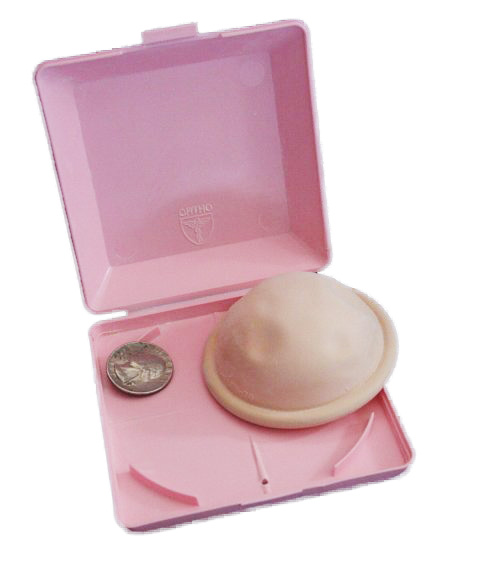
Diaphragms were the most commonly used female birth control mechanism before the pill (modern example, shown with a coin for scale).

Two important legal decisions in the 1930s helped increase the accessibility of contraceptives. In 1930, two condom manufacturers sued each other in the Youngs Rubber case, and the judge ruled that contraceptive manufacturing was a legitimate business enterprise. He went further, and declared that the federal law prohibiting the mailing of condoms was not legally sound. Sanger precipitated a second legal breakthrough when she ordered a diaphragm from Japan in 1932, hoping to provoke a decisive battle in the courts. The diaphragm was confiscated by the U.S. government, and Sanger's subsequent legal challenge led to the 1936 One Package legal ruling by Judge Augustus Hand. His decision overturned an important provision of the anti-contraception laws that prohibited physicians from obtaining contraceptives. This court victory motivated the American Medical Association in 1937 to finally adopt contraception as a normal medical service and a core component of medical school curricula. However, the medical community was slow to accept this new responsibility, and women continued to rely on unsafe and ineffective contraceptive advice from ill-informed sources until the 1960s.

By 1938, over 400 contraceptive manufacturers were in business, over 600 brands of female contraceptives were available, and industry revenues exceeded $250 million per year. Condoms were sold in vending machines in some public restrooms, and men spent twice as much on condoms as on shaving. Although condoms had become commonplace in the 1930s, feminists in the movement felt that birth control should be the woman's prerogative, and they continued to push for development of a contraceptive that was under the woman's control, a campaign which ultimately led to the birth control pill decades later. To increase the availability of high-quality contraceptives, birth control advocates established the Holland–Rantos company to manufacture contraceptives – primarily diaphragms, which were Sanger's recommended method. By the 1930s, the diaphragm with spermicidal jelly had become the most commonly prescribed form of contraception; in 1938, female contraceptives accounted for 85 percent of annual contraceptive sales.

=== Planned Parenthood ===
The 1936 One Package court battle brought together two birth control organizations – the ABCL and the Birth Control Clinical Research Bureau (formerly the CRB) – who had joined forces to craft the successful defense effort. Leaders of both groups viewed this as an auspicious time to merge the two organizations, so, in 1937, the Birth Control Council of America, under the leadership of Sanger, was formed to effect a consolidation. The effort eventually led to the merger of the two organizations in 1939 as the Birth Control Federation of America (BCFA). Although Sanger continued in the role of president, she no longer wielded the same power as she had in the early years of the movement, and, in 1942, more conservative forces within the organization changed the name to Planned Parenthood Federation of America, a name Sanger objected to because she considered it too euphemistic. After World War II, the leadership of Planned Parenthood de-emphasized radical feminism and shifted focus to more moderate themes such as family planning and population policy.

The movement to legalize birth control came to a gradual conclusion around the time Planned Parenthood was formed. In 1942, there were over 400 birth control organizations in America, contraception was fully embraced by the medical profession, and the anti-contraception Comstock laws (which still remained on the books) were rarely enforced.

== Legalization and aftermath ==
After World War II and the Second Woman's Rights Movement, advocacy for reproductive rights transitioned into a new era which focused on birth control, abortion, public funding, and insurance coverage.

Birth control advocacy took on a global aspect as organizations around the world began to collaborate. In the United States, Margaret Sanger was known for her advocacy for birth control and reproductive rights for women and was a prominent figure in the Second Women's Rights Movement which began during the 1960s to the early 1980s. In 1946, Sanger helped found the International Committee on Planned Parenthood, which evolved into the International Planned Parenthood Federation and soon became the world's largest non-governmental international family planning organization. In 1952, John D. Rockefeller III founded the influential Population Council. Fear of global overpopulation became a major issue in the 1960s, generating concerns about pollution, food shortages, and quality of life, leading to well-funded birth control campaigns around the world. In the early 1970s, the United States Congress established the Commission on Population Growth and the American Future (Chairman John D. Rockefeller III) to provide recommendations regarding population growth and its social consequences. The Commission submitted its final recommendations in 1972, which included promoting contraceptives and liberalizing abortion regulations, for example. The 1994 International Conference on Population and Development and the 1995 Fourth World Conference on Women addressed birth control and influenced human rights declarations which asserted women's rights to control their own bodies.

In the early 1950s in the United States, philanthropist Katharine McCormick provided funding for biologist Gregory Pincus to develop the birth control pill, which was approved by the Food and Drug Administration (FDA) in 1960. The pill became very popular and had a major impact on society and culture. It contributed to a sharp increase in college attendance and graduation rates for women. New forms of intrauterine devices were introduced in the 1960s, increasing popularity of long acting reversible contraceptives.

In 1965, the Supreme Court ruled in Griswold v. Connecticut that it was unconstitutional for the government to prohibit married couples from using birth control.

In 1967 activist Bill Baird was arrested for distributing a contraceptive foam and a condom to a student during a lecture on birth control and abortion at Boston University. Baird's appeal of his conviction resulted in the United States Supreme Court case Eisenstadt v. Baird (1972), which extended the Griswold holding to unmarried couples, and thereby legalized birth control for all Americans.

In 1970, Congress finally removed references to contraception from federal anti-obscenity laws; and in 1973, the Roe v. Wade decision legalized abortion during the first trimester of pregnancy.

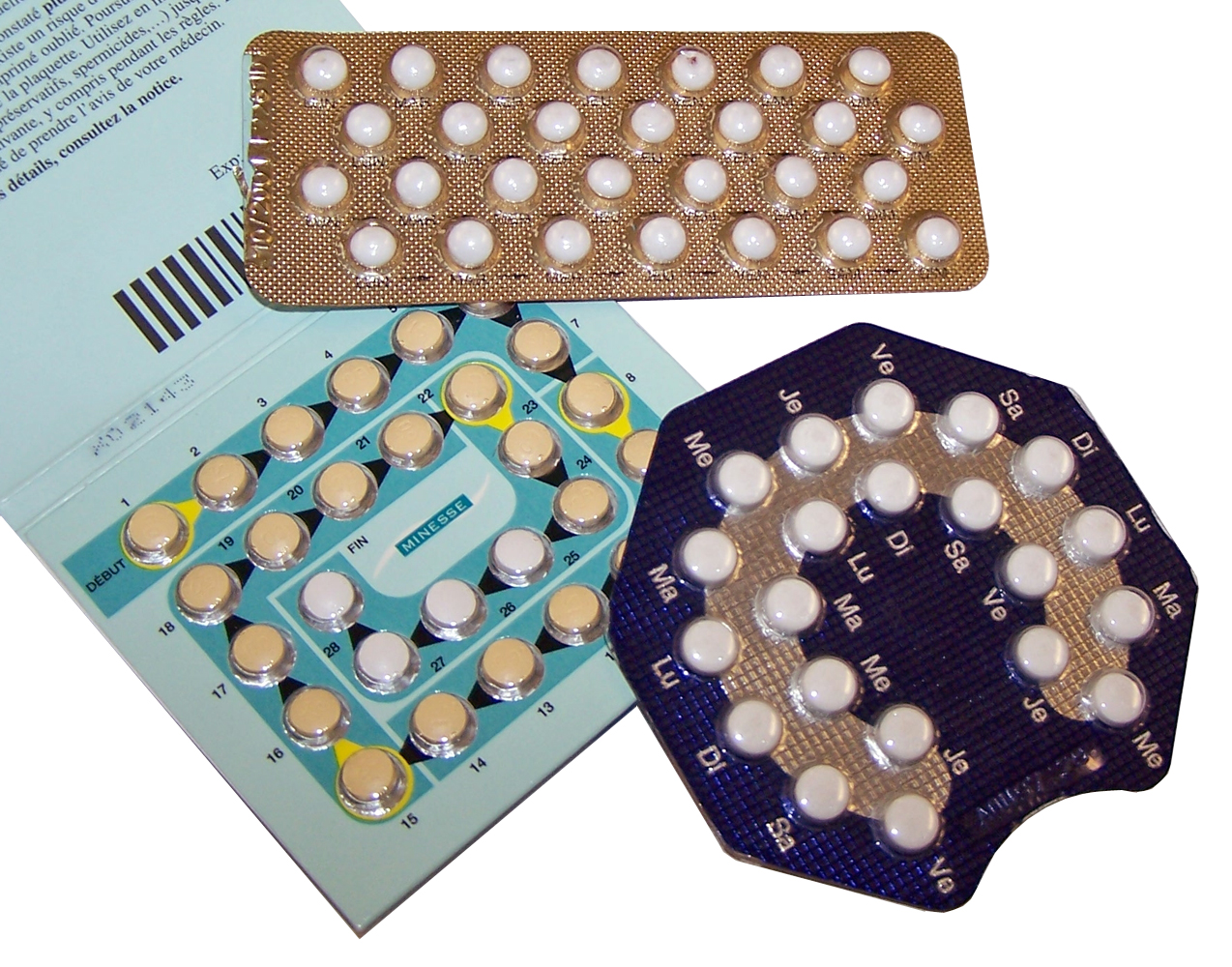
Birth control pills

Also in 1970, Title X of the Public Health Service Act was enacted as part of the War on Poverty, to make family planning and preventive health services available to low-income and the uninsured. Without publicly funded family planning services, according to the Guttmacher Institute, the number of unintended pregnancies and abortions in the United States would be nearly two-thirds higher; the number of unintended pregnancies among poor women would nearly double. According to the United States Department of Health and Human Services, publicly funded family planning saves nearly $4 in Medicaid expenses for every $1 spent on services.

In 1982, European drug manufacturers developed mifepristone, which was initially utilized as a contraceptive, but is now generally prescribed with a prostoglandin to induce abortion in pregnancies up to the fourth month of gestation. To avoid consumer boycotts organized by anti-abortion organizations, the manufacturer donated the U.S. manufacturing rights to Danco Laboratories, a company formed by pro-choice advocates, with the sole purpose of distributing mifepristone in the U.S., and thus immune to the effects of boycotts.

In 1997, the FDA approved a prescription emergency contraception pill (known as the morning-after pill), which became available over the counter in 2006.

== See also ==
- Birth control in the United States
- History of abortion
- History of condoms
- Timeline of reproductive rights legislation
- Social hygiene movement
