= National Committee on Federal Legislation for Birth Control =

American birth control lobbying organization (1929-37)

The National Committee on Federal Legislation for Birth Control was a birth control lobbying organization set up in 1929 in Chicago by Margaret Sanger and the Illinois Birth Control League.

The organization was set up into four regional sections. Its headquarters was moved to Washington, D.C. in 1933. The committee was disbanded in 1937, six months after the successful outcome in favor of birth control of the court case United States v. One Package of Japanese Pessaries.

== See also ==
- Birth control movement in the United States
