= Ralph Roeder =

American writer and actor (1890–1969)

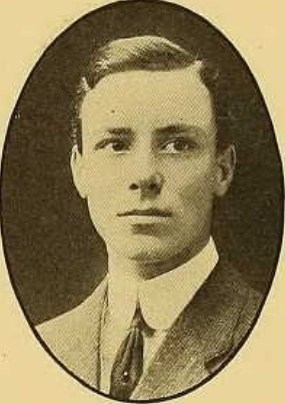
- Born: Ralph Edmund LeClercq Roeder; April 7, 1890; New York City, U.S.
- Died: October 22, 1969 (aged 79); Mexico City
- Resting place: Panteón de Dolores
- Education: Harvard University; Columbia University
- Occupations: Writer and actor
- Notable work: Juárez and His México, a Biographical History (1947)
- Spouse: Fania Mindell (m. 1929)
- Relatives: Marie Siegling (grandmother)
- Awards: Orden del Águila Azteca

Ralph Edmund LeClercq Roeder (April 7, 1890 – October 22, 1969) was an American writer. He wrote the first major work in English on the Mexican President Benito Juárez.

== Biography ==
Ralph Edmund LeClercq Roeder was born in New York City, a son of German immigrant George Roeder and Ida Carolina LeClercq of Charleston, South Carolina. His maternal grandmother was the American composer Marie Regina Siegling LeClercq.

Roeder was educated at Harvard University and at Columbia University. In the 1920s he was Rome correspondent for the Chicago Daily News. He contributed articles to The Arts and to Theater Arts Monthly and had a brief career as an actor on Broadway, playing among other roles, Orestes in Sophocles's Electra. On December 3, 1929, he married Russian Empire-born Fania Esiah Mindell of New York, a theater set and costume designer, artist, and feminist who, together with Margaret Sanger and her sister Ethel Byrne, had been a co-defendant in the Brownsville Clinic Trials of 1917.

Well before meeting Fania, Roeder had shown interest in leftist causes. As a freshly minted college graduate Roeder had traveled to Mexico during the Revolution which began in 1910. He had sided with Pancho Villa as a volunteer, and at one point was captured "by Mexican counter-revolutionaries and was stood against a wall to be shot. For some reason the order to fire was not given and he survived." During the 1930s, Roeder researched and wrote three books on Italian history, but by the late 1940s, he again turned his interest to Mexico. During the 1950s, with McCarthyism on the rise at home, the Roeders moved to Mexico City. Here, "Ralph continued work he had begun in New York for the Exiled Writers Committee",

Roeder spent much of his later life as an expatriate in Mexico City, where he wrote and translated works of a mostly historical nature. In addition to Italian, he spoke German and French fluently, and authored books in Spanish.

His 1947 biography of Benito Juárez was reviewed in scholarly journals in the U.S. In Hispanic American Historical Review historian Walter V. Scholes praises Roeder's book for bringing a major biography of Juárez to an English-language readership, but faults it for its complete lack of scholarly citations, the hallmark of verifiability of information. Scholes also finds Roeder's lack of in-depth coverage of key problems in Mexico during the nineteenth-century and uneven coverage of Juárez's life. A review in The Catholic Historical Review by Robert J. Welch likewise faults Roeder for his lack of citations. "It is almost inconceivable that a full-length treatment, posing as a dependable history of a controversial figure and period, would have completely ignored so fundamental a requirement."

In 1965, Roeder was given Mexico's highest literary award, the Orden del Águila Azteca. He died in Mexico City in 1969 of a gunshot wound to the head in an apparent suicide, at the age of 79. Roeder is buried at the city's Panteón de Dolores.

== Works ==
- Savanarola: A Study in Conscience, Brentano's, New York, 1930.
- The Man of the Renaissance: Four Lawgivers, Savonarola, Machiavelli, Castiglione, Aretino, The Viking Press, 1933.
- Catherine de Medici and the Lost Revolution, The Viking Press, 1937.
- Juárez and His México, a Biographical History – Complete in Two Volumes, The Viking Press, 1947.
- Hacia el México moderno: Porfirio Diaz, 1973.

== Sources ==
- Introduction of the book, Ralph Roeder Juárez y Su México, second edition.
