= Clelia Duel Mosher =

American physician

- Mosher in Red Cross uniform during the First World War
- Born: 16 December 1863; Albany, New York, United States
- Died: 21 December 1940 (aged 77)
- Occupations: Professor, Hygienist, Red Cross
- Writing career
- Genre: Health

Clelia Duel Mosher (KLEEL-ya DUE-el MOE-sher; December 16, 1863 – December 21, 1940) was a physician, hygienist and women's health advocate who disapproved of Victorian stereotypes about the physical incapacities of women.

== Education ==
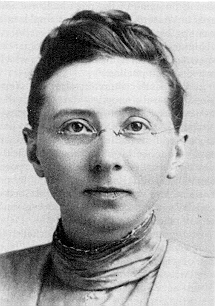
Clelia Duel Mosher, 1892

Mosher attended Wellesley College, the University of Wisconsin, and Stanford University, where she received a bachelor's degree in zoology in 1893. In 1894, she received a master's degree from Stanford. In 1896, Mosher became a student at the Johns Hopkins School of Medicine. Mosher's Master's degree thesis disproved the then widely held belief that women were physically inferior to men because they could only breathe costally, showing instead it was only women’s fashionable corset clothing of the time that prevented diaphragmatic breathing. She found that women would breathe with their diaphragm with enough exercise.

== Career ==
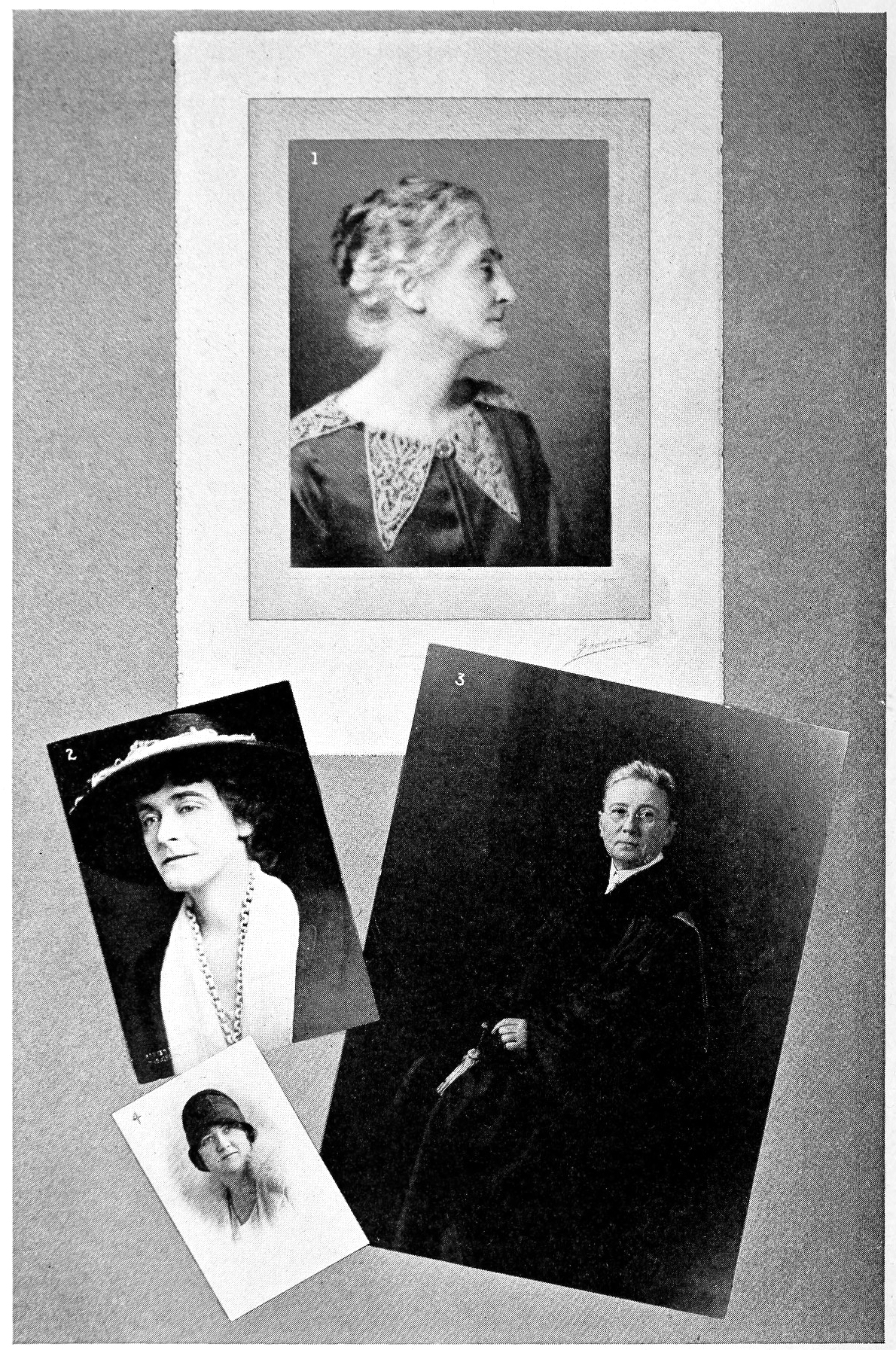
Fannie Brown Patrick, Anne Jennings Kluegel, Clelia G. Mosher, Mrs. B.F. Chappelle.jpg

After her graduation as a doctor of medicine, Mosher worked in private practice, until she became an assistant professor of personal hygiene at Stanford in 1910.

Mosher subsequently researched menstruation, gathering data from 2,000 women over 12,000 menstrual cycles. She revealed unhygienic habits that caused painful menstruation and created the Mosher breathing exercise, making her possibly the first American physician to advocate core-body-strength-increasing exercises to reduce the pain of menstrual cramps.

Her most famous work, published posthumously, was a survey that she began in 1892 as an undergraduate when preparing to lecture on the "Marital Relation" before the Mother's Club of the University of Wisconsin, and continued throughout her career. It is the only known existing survey of Victorian women's sexual habits, and was initially controversial because of its frankness and the overwhelmingly sex-positive views of the participants, even including the use of "male sheaths" (now called condoms) and "rubber cap over the uterus" (either a diaphragm or cervical cap) birth control. All this stood in high contrast to other existing historical literature of the time which held that women have no sexual desires and sex should only be used for reproduction. One theory is because the researcher was a woman gathering data from women that knew the results would only be put forth before a purely female audience, the normal strictures of propriety of that time were let down and more realistic data was actually gathered.

== See also ==
- Birth control movement in the United States

== Selected works ==
- Normal Menstruation and Some of the Factors Modifying It (Johns Hopkins Hospital Bulletin)
- The Relation of Health to the Woman Movement (1915)
- Woman’s Physical Freedom (1923)
- Mosher, Clelia Duel (1980). The Mosher survey: Sexual attitudes of 45 Victorian women. USA: Arno Pr. ISBN 0-405-13090-2.

== Sources ==
=== Printed ===
- Hyde, Janet Shebley (1990). Understanding Human Sexuality. USA: McGraw-Hill. ASIN B000KE23NI.

=== Web ===
- Jacob, Kathryn Allamong (1981). "The Mosher Report". American Heritage. 32 (4): 56–64. PMID 11614166. Archived from the original on 25 February 2009.
- Museum of Menstruation. "Woman's Physical Freedom". Museum of Menstruation scans of the original book.
- Anonymous. "Who is Clelia Duel Mosher?". Stanford School of Medicine. Archived from the original on June 28, 2007.
- Anonymous. "1892 image of Clelia Duel Mosher". Humboldt University of Berlin. Archived from the original on 3 January 2009.
- David A. Gershaw, Ph.D. "The First Sex Survey". Arizona Western College. Archived from the original on 12 September 2006.
