= Van Kleeck Allison =

Van Kleek Allison (born ca. 1894, date of death unknown) was an American birth control activist who worked in the birth control movement in the United States. He was arrested in Boston in July 1916, for handing out leaflets that described contraception, and sentenced to three years in prison. Allison was the child of a wealthy New York family. In 1917 he co-edited (with Mike Gold) a radical Boston newspaper called The Flame: A Monthly magazine of Literature and revolution, which ran for 3 issues.
