= Brewery Collectibles Club of America =

US nonprofit organization

- Type: Membership driven
- Industry: History, research
- Founded: 1970
- Headquarters: Fenton, Missouri, U.S.
- Key people: Keith Kerschner (President)
- Products: Memberships, magazine, library, conventions
- Website: www.bcca.com

The Brewery Collectibles Club of America (BCCA) is a 501(c)(3) organization established in 1970 by Denver Wright Jr. It is located in Fenton, Missouri, near St. Louis. The organization focuses on documenting the history of brewing both in the United States and internationally, as well as preserving brewery-related artifacts. Originally named the Beer Can Collectors of America, the organization was renamed the Brewery Collectibles Club of America in 2003.

The BCCA has approximately 3,000 members globally. It is managed by three officers and a nine-member Board of Directors. The organization also includes committees responsible for overseeing various club operations.

Many members belong to multiple BCCA chapters, which organize club-sponsored events in their local areas. The BCCA hosts approximately 60 regional events annually. Additionally, the organization has held an annual convention, known as Canvention, every year since 1971.

== History ==
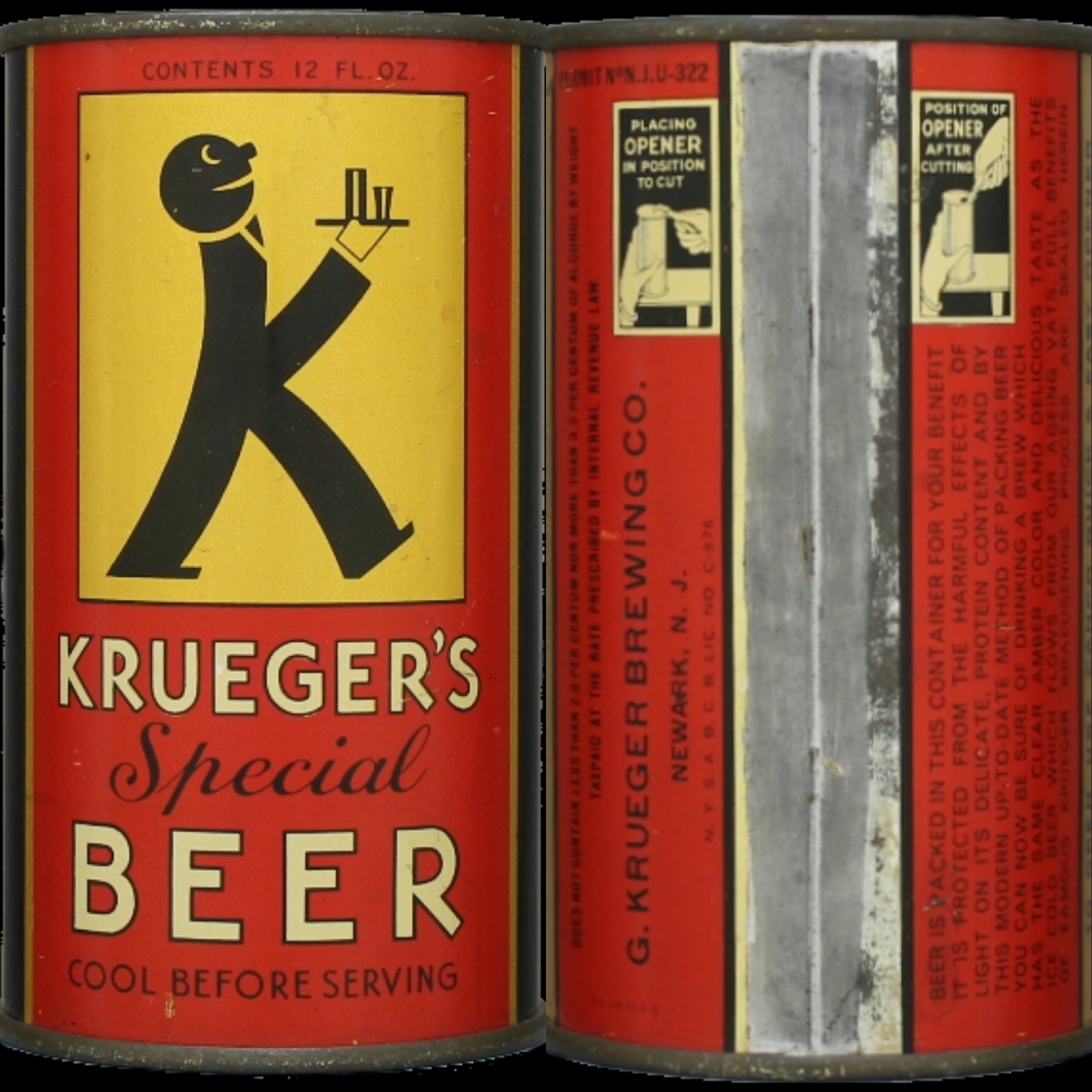
This is an original 1933 prototype beer can, or "test can", manufactured by American Can Company for the Gottfried Krueger Brewing Company of Newark, NJ. BCCA was started by beer can collectors in 1970.

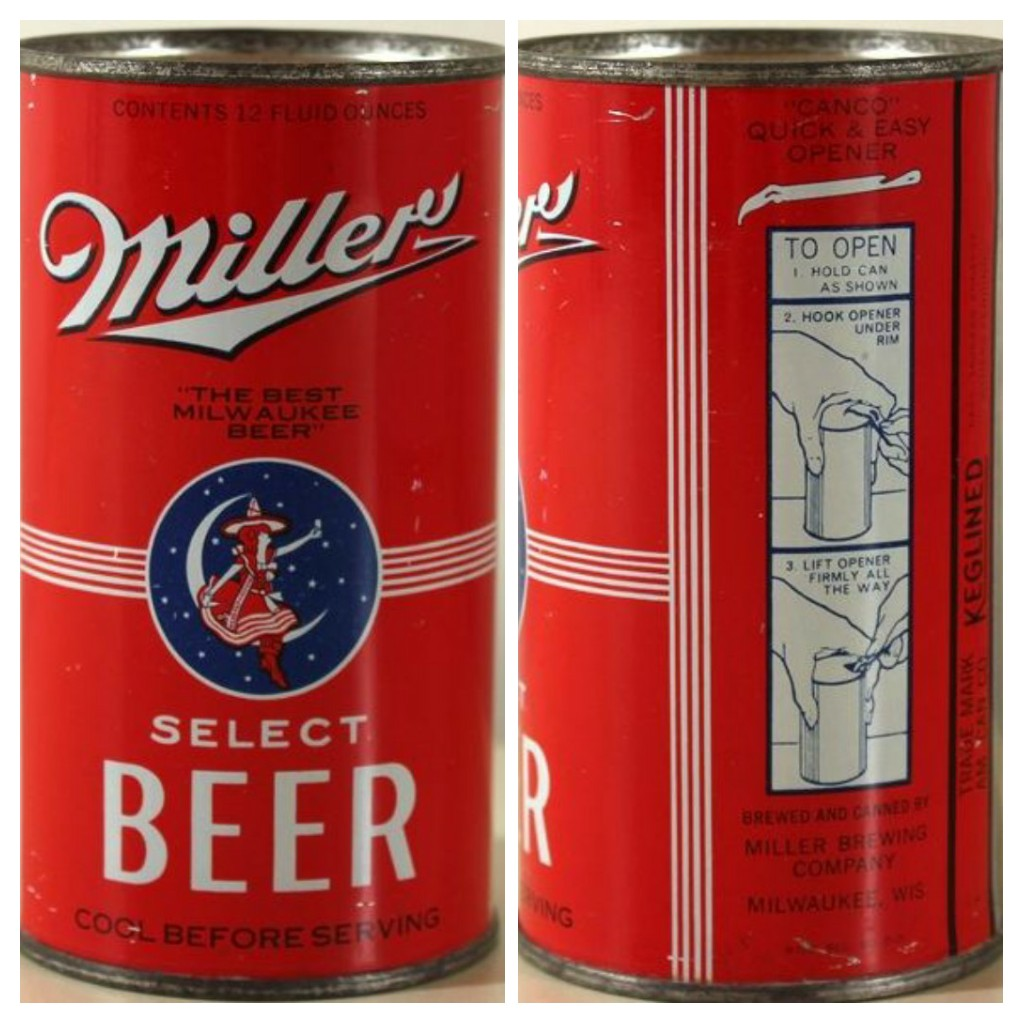
A Miller beer can from the late 1930s; note opening instructions (OI) on the back of the can. BCCA members collect and preserve items like OI cans for their rarity and historic value.

The Gottfried Krueger Brewing Company of Newark, New Jersey, introduced the first beer cans to the market in Richmond, Virginia, on January 24, 1935. Canned beer quickly became popular, leading brewers worldwide to install canning lines or adapt their bottling lines to fill cans. For smaller brewers, this development led to the use of "cone top" style cans that could be processed through existing bottling lines. Larger brewers, such as Anheuser-Busch, Miller, and Pabst, developed new canning processes for "flat top" style cans, many of which included opening instructions printed on the back. Consumers soon had a wide variety of canned beers to choose from, and hobbyists began collecting cans from both the United States and around the world. This was a time when most breweries were local or regional, unlike the later dominance of large-scale breweries like Anheuser-Busch and Molson Coors.

On October 20, 1969, an article in the St. Louis Globe-Democrat featured the beer can collection of Denver Wright Jr. This article led other St. Louis-area breweriana collectors to contact Wright. At a meeting at Wright's house on April 15, 1970, six of these collectors founded the Beer Can Collectors of America. By the end of 1971, the BCCA had 304 members from 17 states and Canada. The organization's logo was trademarked in 1977.

BCCA's membership experienced steady growth throughout the 1970s, reaching a peak of 11,954 members in 1978. As demand for rarer cans increased, some members found the BCCA's no-sale policy outdated. Consequently, the World Wide Beer Can Collectors organization was established to appeal to individuals who were dissatisfied with BCCA policies.

Decreasing membership numbers during the 1980s prompted the BCCA to expand its scope to encompass collectors of all types of breweriana. This shift in focus ultimately resulted in the club changing its name to the Brewery Collectibles Club of America in 2003. The club modified its bylaws to permit chapters to establish their own regulations regarding members' transactions involving breweriana items.

Through its bimonthly magazine and additional publications, the BCCA extensively documents the history of brewing in both America and globally. In 1995, the BCCA sanctioned the research and publication of the reference guide United States Beer Cans. Volume I, which concentrated on cans requiring an opener (e.g., flat tops and cone tops), was released in 2000, while Volume II, focusing on "self-opening" cans (e.g., pull tabs), was published in 2007.

The BCCA maintains an archive of historical beer cans intended for college reunions. As of 2020, this collection comprises 155 distinct varieties, with 100 specifically designated for Princeton University.

== Headquarters ==
The BCCA's Fenton, Missouri headquarters was established in 1977. Usually, one or two of the six annual board meetings are held at this location. Additionally, the BCCA employs individuals remotely to fulfill roles such as magazine editor, staff, and webmaster.

== Membership ==
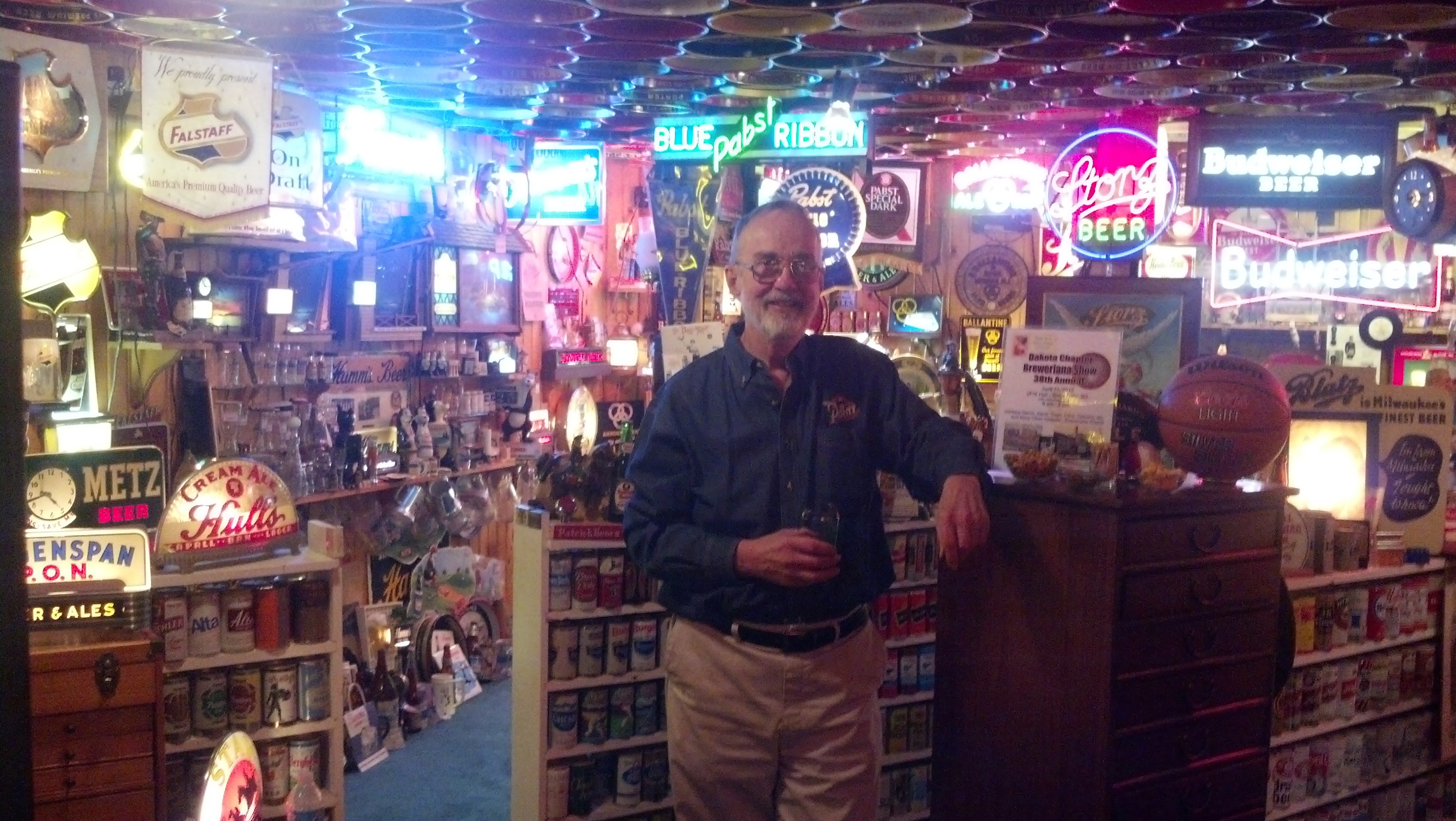
A BCCA member and his collection of breweriana.

As of 2019, the BCCA boasts approximately 3,000 members. Peak membership was recorded in 1978, with 11,954 active members. Additionally, the organization hosts an annual three-day national event called Canvention.

Active members hail from all 50 states, with multiple representatives from each. Furthermore, there are 36 Canadian members from eight provinces and 57 members from 17 countries outside North America who maintain active memberships.

== Breweriana ==
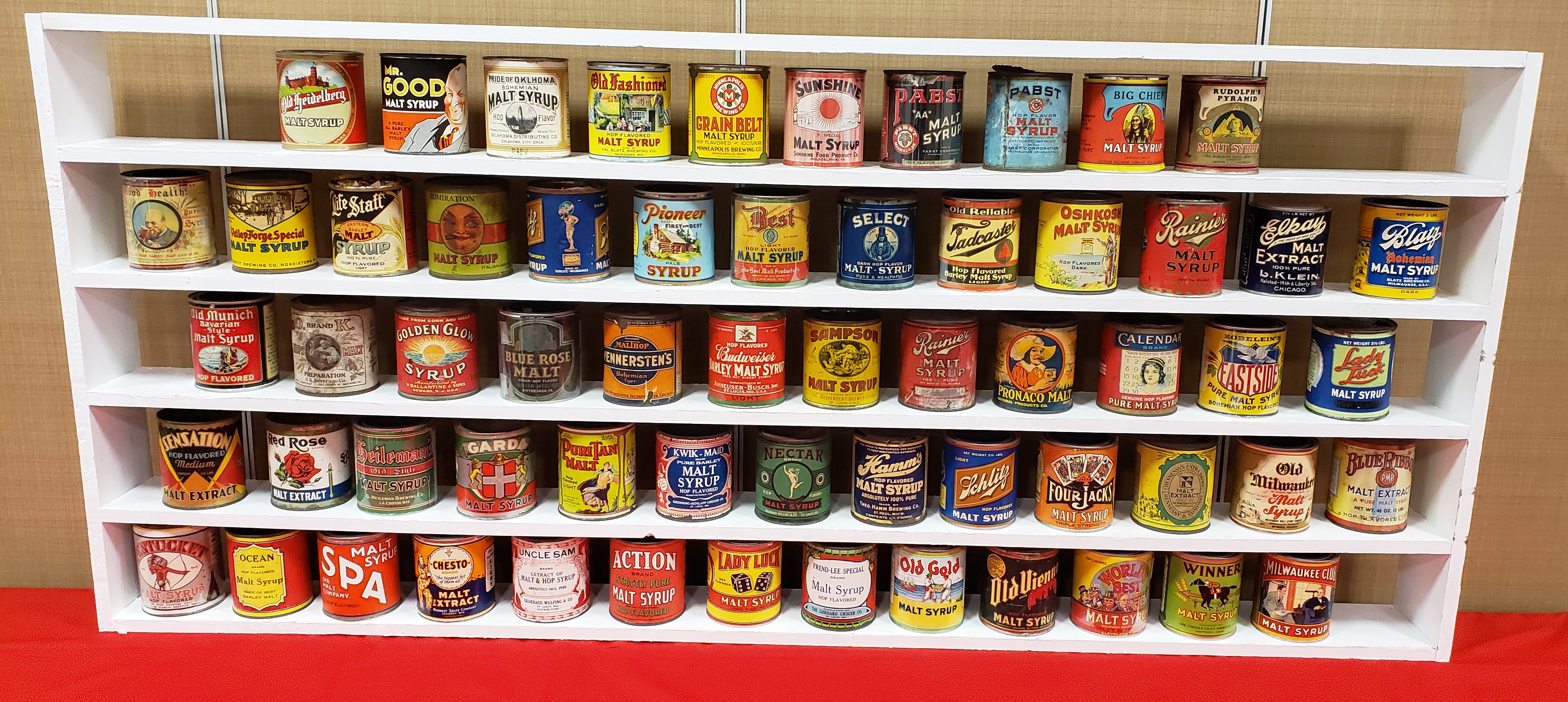
Malt syrup tins from the 1920s and 1930s. Many feature names of American breweries both past and present.

BCCA members commonly collect a wide range of brewery-related items, including beer cans, bottles, signs, and tap knobs. Any items used by breweries for manufacturing or marketing their products are considered collectible. This encompasses non-alcoholic items marketed by breweries during Prohibition, such as soda and malt beverage containers, malt syrup tins, and ice cream containers. Items predating Prohibition are particularly sought after by collectors.

In the early years of the BCCA, when collecting primarily centered around beer cans, members were categorized into five tiers based on the size of their collections. As the club evolved, there was a shift in focus from quantity to placing greater value on the relative rarity, condition, and uniqueness of each item. Collectors also observed a growing interest in rare breweriana beyond beer cans. This broader interest among members was a significant factor motivating the name change in 2003.

== Events ==
The BCCA hosts an annual event called Canvention, typically held in August or September, often coinciding with Labor Day weekend. All Canventions have taken place in the United States, except for CANvention 22 in 1992, which was held in Toronto. Canvention events have been hosted by 27 different states across all regions of the United States.

The BCCA sponsors regional shows worldwide, which are usually smaller and shorter versions of Canvention. Approximately 60 of these events are held annually.

== Chapters ==
As of 2022, the BCCA acknowledges 92 chapters. These chapters generally comprise members who reside in the same geographic region. For instance, The Badger Bunch, the first BCCA chapter, was established by Wisconsin-based members in 1972. Additionally, there are 19 "at-large" chapters designated for members who share a particular collecting interest or status, irrespective of their location. There are five BCCA chapters located outside the United States, with three in Canada, and one each in Australia and Brazil.

== Hall Of Fame ==
The BCCA established a Hall of Fame in 1983 to recognize members who have made exceptional contributions to the club. Individuals who were named Collector of the Year before the establishment of the Hall of Fame were included as charter members. Eligibility for induction into the BCCA Hall of Fame is limited to living members. Additionally, in 2008, and subsequently revised in 2019, the BCCA empowered the Nominating Committee of past presidents to nominate members who had not been previously selected or deceased members for posthumous induction. As of 2022, there are 64 honorees in the Hall of Fame.
