= Fania Mindell =

American feminist, activist, and theater artist (1894–1969)

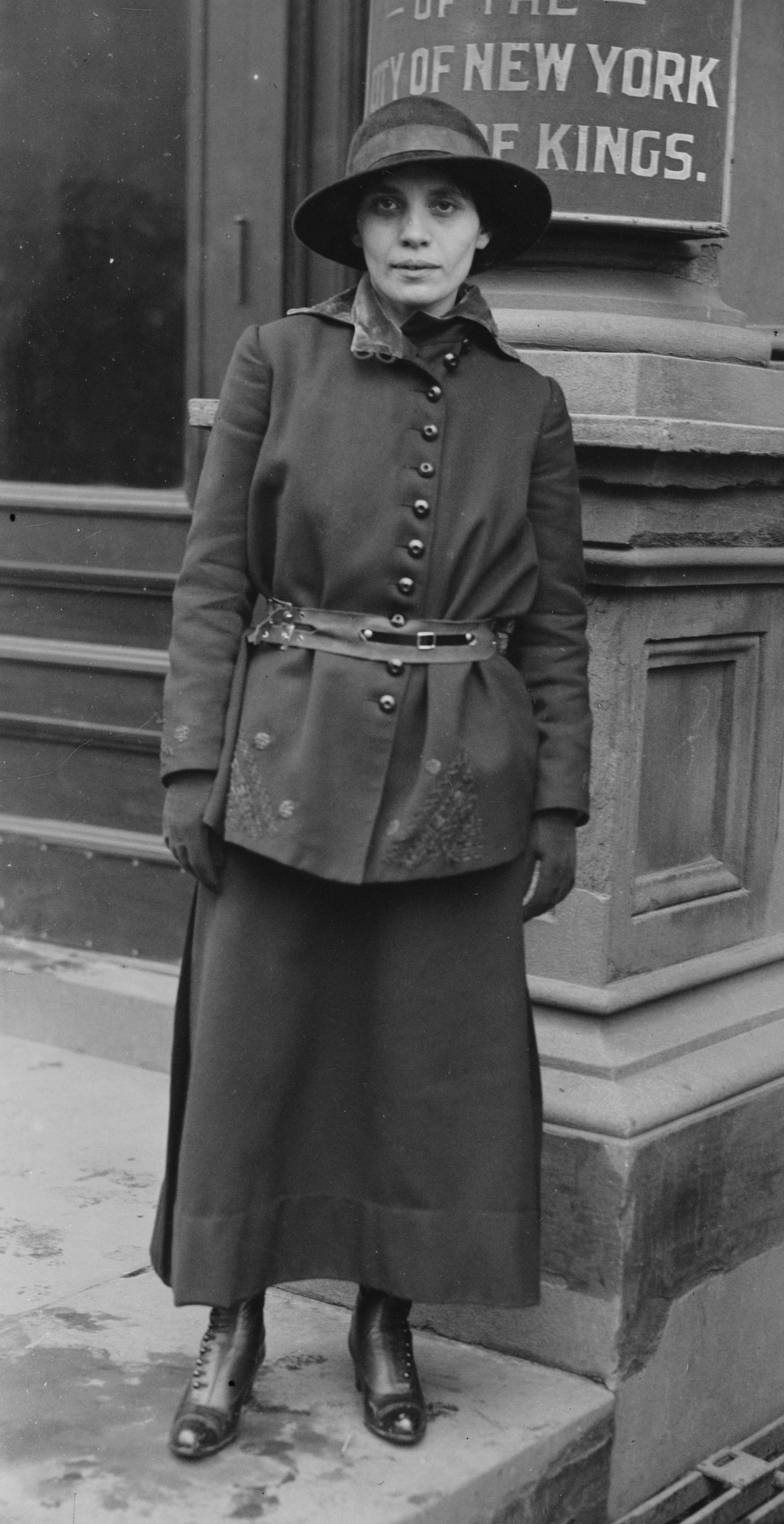
- Mindell outside Brooklyn courthouse in 1917
- Born: Fania Esiah Mindell; December 15, 1894; Minsk, Belarus, Russia
- Died: July 18, 1969 (aged 74); Mexico City, Mexico
- Known for: Co-founding what later became Planned Parenthood
- Spouse: Ralph Edmund LeClercq Roeder

Fania Esiah Mindell (December 15, 1894 – July 18, 1969) was an American feminist, activist, and theater artist best known for her role in co-founding one of the first birth control clinics in the United States.

== Life and career ==
Mindell was born in Minsk, Russia on December 15, 1894 to Jewish parents. She emigrated to Brooklyn, New York in 1906 with her parents and family, and became a US citizen in 1919. She was an accomplished artist, and became a set and costume designer for Broadway theaters in New York. Notably, she designed costumes for Uncle Vanya. In addition to her design work, she translated dramatic materials from Russian to English including her version of Maxim Gorky's play, "Night Lodging", which was performed at the Plymouth Theater in 1920. Edward G. Robinson was among the performers. Fania was also the proprietor of Little Russia, a small boutique in Greenwich Village, just off Washington Square which featured curios from Russia, but her true passion was for feminist and progressive causes.

Mindell's most significant contribution to social innovation was through her involvement in the birth control movement, introducing a new model of accessible and community-based reproductive healthcare and education. As a young political activist in 1916 Chicago, she met the now famous feminist leaders Margaret Sanger and her sister Ethel Byrne. She arranged for Sanger to speak to 1500 stockyard workers in Chicago, using her repression in Russia as fuel to forward the feminist movement. After this, the women took this fight to New York, where they led a campaign of civil disobedience in order to create more access to birth control. As a Jewish woman, Mindell led the conversation with local Jewish communities and translated for them in order to spread information. After spreading the word door-to-door and translating information into different languages to reach more New Yorkers, they decided to open a clinic in one of Brooklyn's "poorest neighborhoods and one with a large immigrant population". While wealthy women were sometimes able to access reproductive health services, working-class women almost never had access to these resources. The clinic directly addressed a systemic gap in healthcare and education that disproportionally affected women in marginalized communities.

"Together, the three women opened the first birth control clinic in the United States in Brooklyn known as the "Brownsville Clinic" (after the Brownsville section of Brooklyn in which it was located). The clinic opened on October 16, 1916, with over 100 women coming in on the very first day. At the time, access to contraceptives and information surrounding them was heavily restricted under obscenity laws, leaving many women without control of their reproductive health. The clinic aimed to address this gap particularly for working-class women.

After the clinic's opening, Mindell was crucial for a variety of tasks. She was mostly a social worker and translator speaking English, Yiddish, and Italian, but also contributed to client intake and record-keeping. They were able to serve over 450 women within the first few days, and Mindell spread awareness of the clinic's existence to women in the community.

The clinic caused an immediate sensation in the press, getting national attention, and all three women were arrested and tried for "distributing obscene materials". "The police monitored the Clinic from its opening and sent in a female undercover agent to purchase contraceptive supplies. On October 26 (1916) an undercover police woman and vice-squad officers raided the clinic, confiscated an assortment of contraceptives from pessaries to condoms, along with 20 'books on young women', and arrested Sanger, Byrne and Mindell. After being arraigned, Sanger and Mindell spent the night in the Raymond Street jail, Byrne at the Liberty Avenue station. All were released the next morning on $500.00 bail." Mindell was convicted on February 2 for selling an indecent book entitled "What Every Girl Should Know" by the Court of Special Sessions.

All three women were found guilty, but eventually the verdicts were overturned, and their campaign was ultimately successful, leading to major changes in social policy and to the laws governing birth control and sex education around the world. The clinic closed but later became the basis for what was to become known as Planned Parenthood, an organization that continues to provide reproductive healthcare and education worldwide.

The impact of Mindell's work extended far beyond the closure of the Brownsville Clinic. The activism and legal changes surrounding the clinic opened the door for broader reproductive rights movements and policy changes. While Mindell did not remain in the public spotlight to the same extent as her contemporaries, her contributions were instrumental in initiating systemic change. The innovation of accessible birth control services remains highly relevant today, relating to the core issue of reproductive autonomy. Her work helped normalize conversations around reproductive health, especially in the Jewish community.

The innovation that Mindell helped introduce is not obsolete, but rather, it has significantly evolved. Early birth control clinics faced significant legal and social barriers that still continue today, but modern systems have greater medical sophistication and legal protection. Access remains uneven, and debates surrounding reproductive rights continue, showing how the core issue Mindell tried to address is still relevant today.

On December 3, 1929 Fania married Ralph Edmund LeClercq Roeder, a scholar, historian, and author who shared her interest in drama and theater, and in leftist causes. The couple traveled extensively- in Europe, the Caribbean, and Haiti in the 1930s- but seem to have fallen in love with Mexico by the 1940s. Fania's brother, Jacob "Pop" Mindel, a dentist by profession, was a Communist Party member who was later prosecuted and jailed under the Smith Act. Her brother's views and her association with leftist causes may have influenced the Roeder's decision to move to Mexico by the 1950s when McCarthyism was prevalent in the United States. During this period many political activists, artists and intellectuals from the United States sought refuge in Mexico. Fania and her husband spent much of their later lives there as expatriates in Mexico City where Ralph studied and authored a number of books including a seminal biography of Benito Juárez for which he was honored with Mexico's highest literary award, the Orden del Águila Azteca.

Fania and her husband both died in Mexico City in 1969 – Fania in July and her husband in October.
