= Birth Control Council of America =

The Birth Control Council of America (BCCA) was a short-lived organization that was established 1937 to reconcile the activities of the American Birth Control League (ABCL) and the Birth Control Clinical Research Bureau (BCCRB). The goal was to reduce redundancy, improve cooperation, and discuss the future of the birth control movement in the United States. The BCCA was created following the 1936 United States v. One Package of Japanese Pessaries federal court case, effectively removing legal obstacles limiting the ability of doctors to import, disseminate and prescribe contraceptives.

Margaret Sanger was the chairman of the BCCA, and under her leadership, it held several meetings in 1937. Topics addressed included clinic affiliation and the possible merger of the two birth control publications: The Birth Control Review and The Birth Control News. The members of the BCCA failed to reach agreement. In 1937, Sanger resigned her role as chairman due to the lack of progress and effectiveness. The BCCA was terminated in late 1937.

== The Council ==
The Council consisted of nine members who met periodically in 1937:

- Margaret Sanger - Chairman
- Henry Pratt Fairchild - Vice-Chairman
- Rabbi Sidney E. Goldstein
- Frederick C. Holden
- Eric M. Matsner
- Allison Pierce Moore
- Abraham Stone
- Hannah Mayer Stone
- Ira Solomon Wile
