= Krueger Mansion =

Historic house in Newark, New Jersey, United States

- U.S. National Register of Historic Places
- New Jersey Register of Historic Places
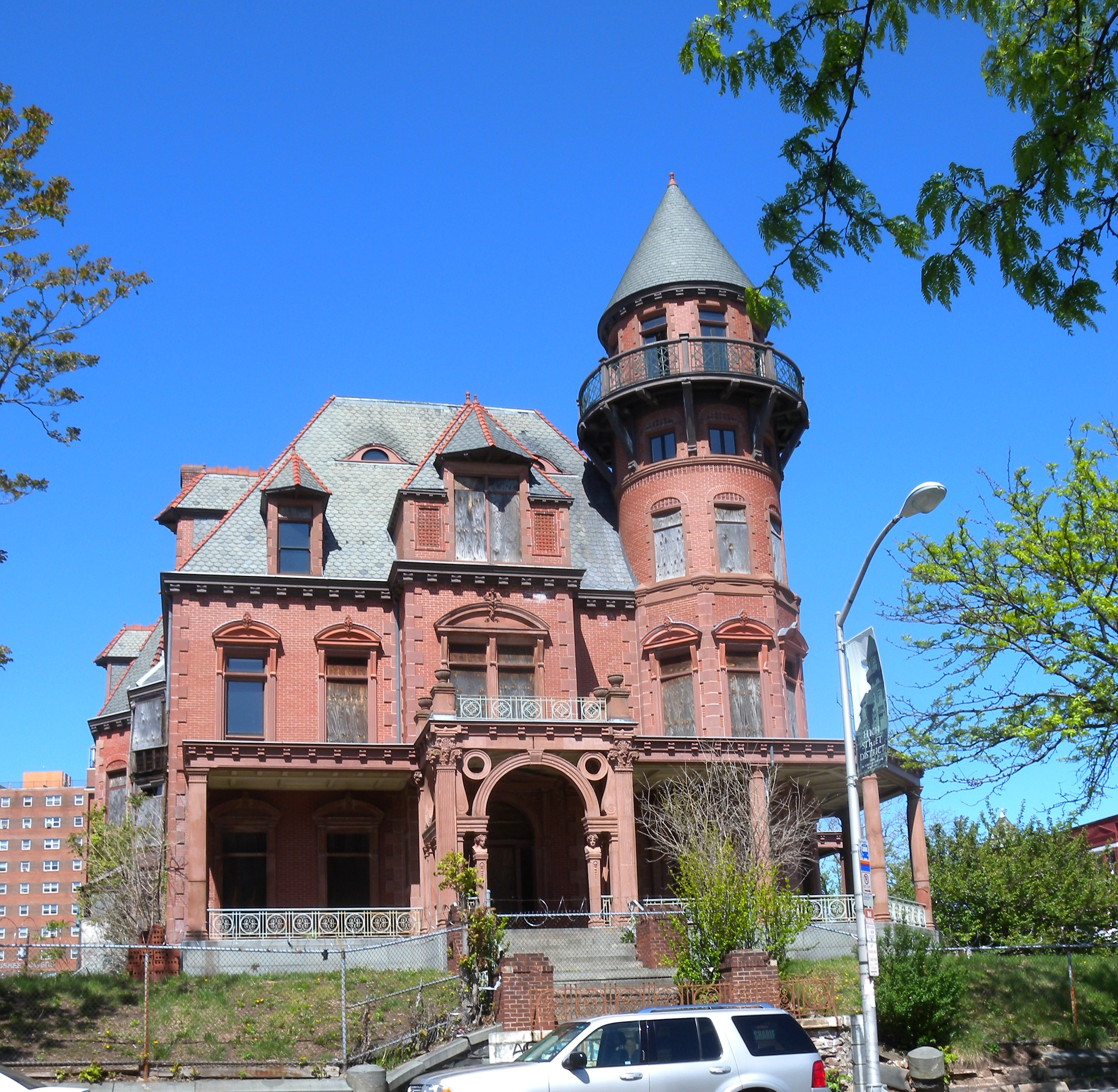
- The Krueger Mansion in 2010

- Location within Essex County, New Jersey Location within New Jersey Location within the United States
- Location: 601 High Street (Martin Luther King Boulevard), Newark, New Jersey
- Coordinates: 40°43′57″N 74°10′54″W
- Area: 1 acre (0.40 ha)
- Built: 1888
- Architect: Henry Schultz
- Architectural style: Late Victorian
- NRHP reference No.: 72000778
- NJRHP No.: 1277

Significant dates
- Added to NRHP: November 9, 1972
- Designated NJRHP: January 14, 1972

The Krueger Mansion is located in Newark, Essex County, New Jersey, United States. The mansion was built on the corner of Court and High Street (now Martin Luther King Boulevard) in 1888 and was added to the National Register of Historic Places on November 9, 1972. As of 2023, it has been completely restored and elaborately landscaped as part of an artisanal workspace project.

== History ==
The 40 room mansion was built in 1888 by Gottfried Krueger (1837–1926), founder of Newark's Gottfried Krueger Brewing Company and owner of several other breweries. The construction cost at the time was $250,000. The mansion was sold to the Valley of Newark Scottish Rite Freemasons in 1926 for $100,000. A 700-seat auditorium was added to the mansion to accommodate for various meetings.

The mansion was purchased in 1958 by Louise Scott for $85,000. Scott operated a beauty school out of the first floor of the mansion while keeping the upper levels as her private residence. The mansion was added to the New Jersey Register of Historic Places and the National Register of Historic Places in 1972.

After Scott died in 1982, ownership of the mansion passed to the city of Newark. In 1991, the New Jersey Historic Trust funded a bond for $625,812 to stabilize the exterior of the building. The city of Newark matched that amount, and over the years devoted more than $4 million to turning the home into a center focusing on the black contribution to Newark's development. The federal government contributed an additional $1.5 million, but after a decade of work, plans to turn the house into an African-American cultural center were frozen by the city's Municipal Council, which refused to allocate any more money for the project.

In late 2020, the city and the company Makerhoods broke ground on refurbishing the mansion into live/work spaces for local experienced "makers" in the food, beauty, craft and other small-scale artisan industries for $1800 a month by application only. As of 2023, the mansion had been almost completely restored and landscaped.

== Construction ==
The mansion is a three-and-a-half-story, Late Victorian style building with a five-story circular tower. A wrap around porch, steeply pitched roof, asymmetrical facade and arched front entryway are characteristic of the Queen Anne Style. The building is a balloon frame structure with a brick facade. The interior consists of lath and plaster walls with wallpaper covering and wood molding. The flooring is made of hardwood set into patterns. The pedimented windows are an Italianate influence here.

== Gallery ==
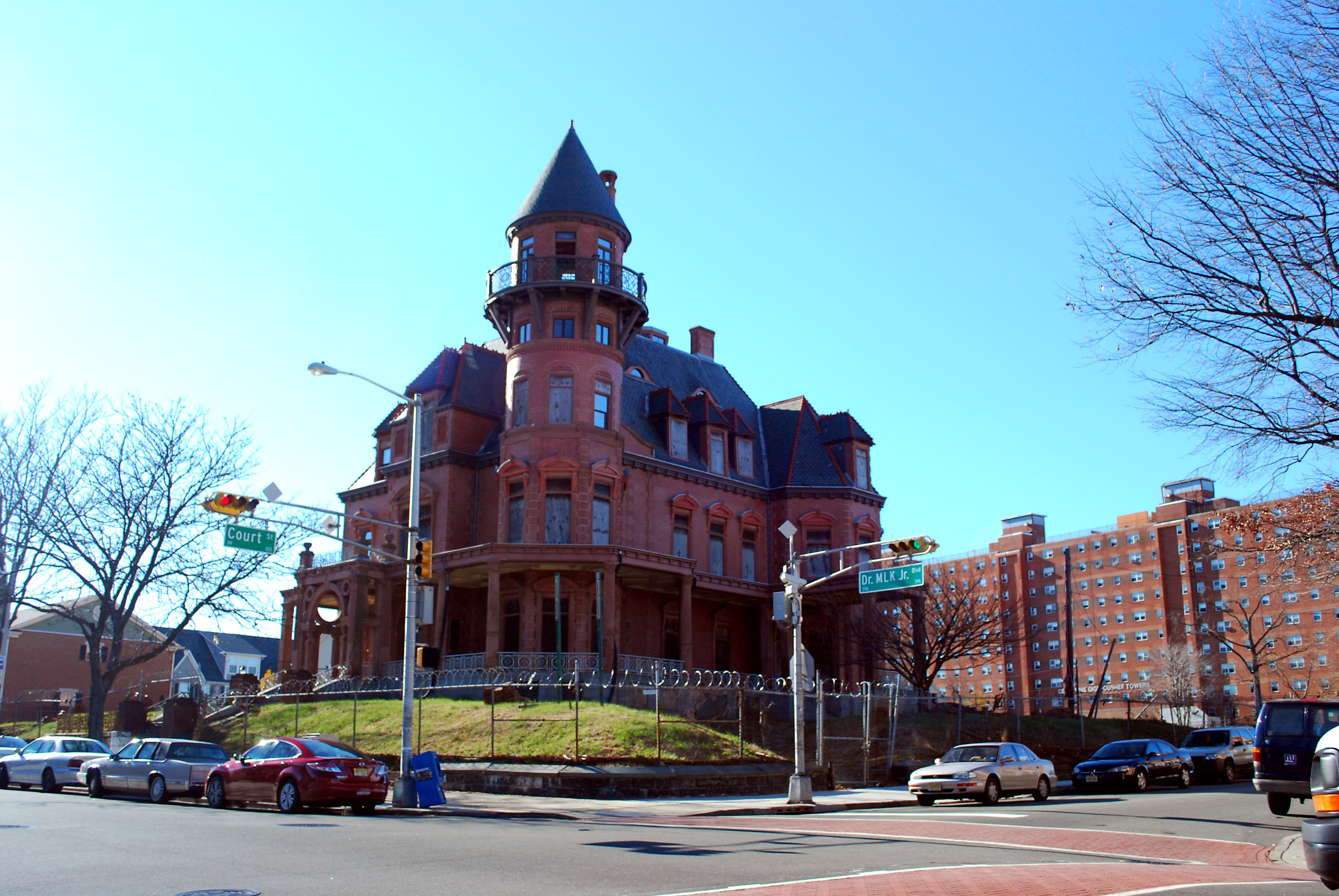
Corner of Court Street and Dr. MLK Jr. Boulevard.

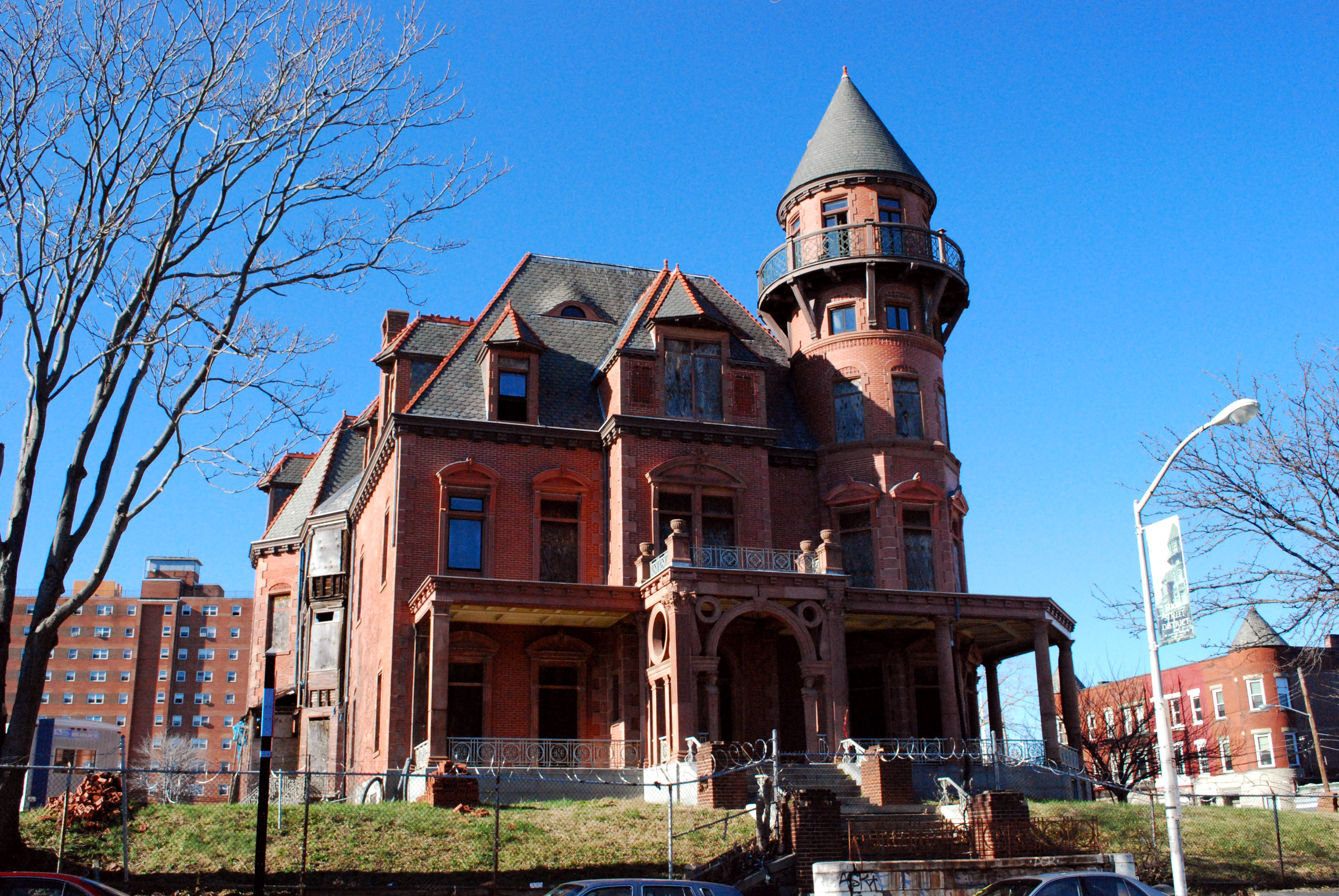
Dr. MLK Jr. Boulevard side.

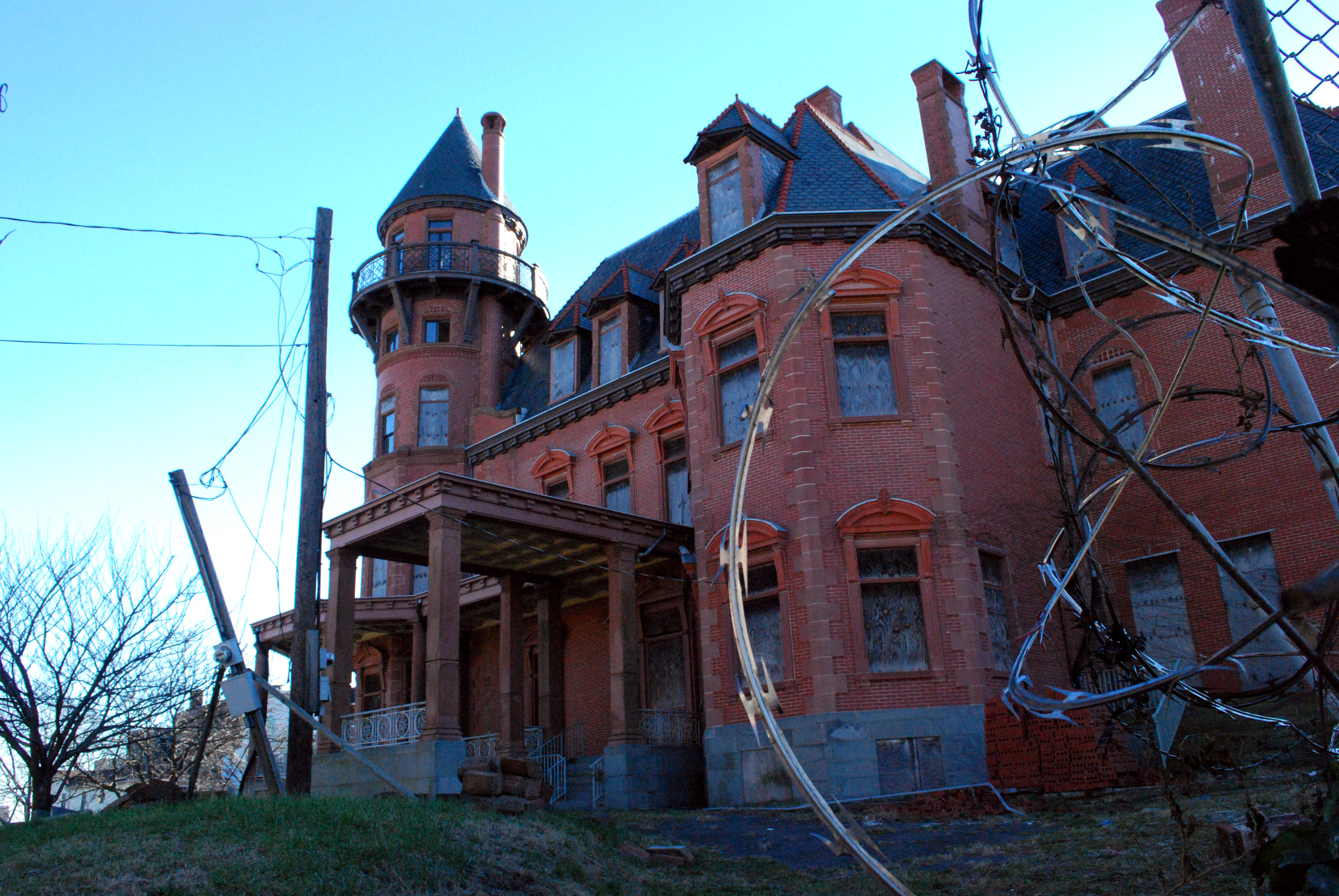
Court Street side.

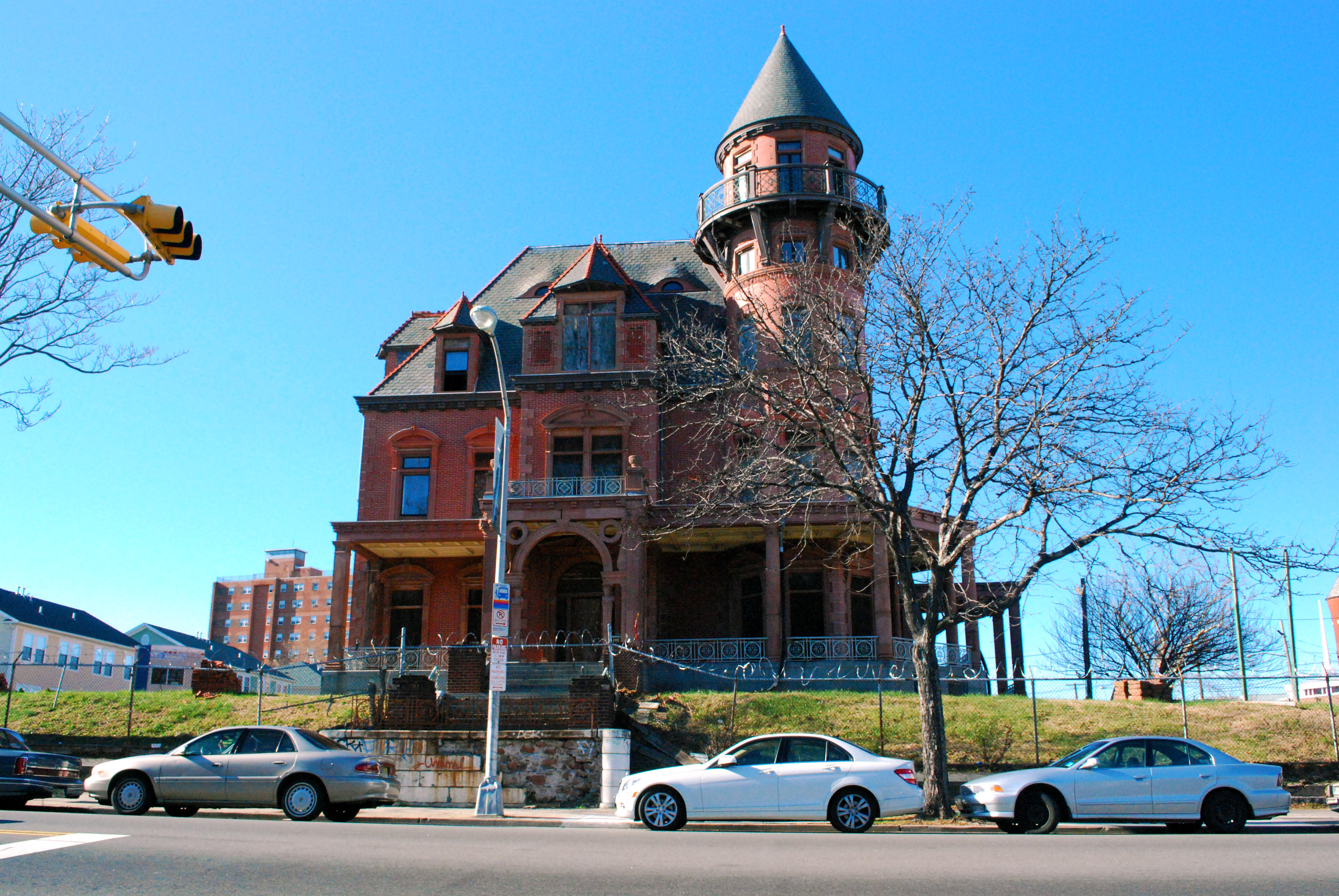
Front Facade of Dr. MLK Jr. Boulevard side.

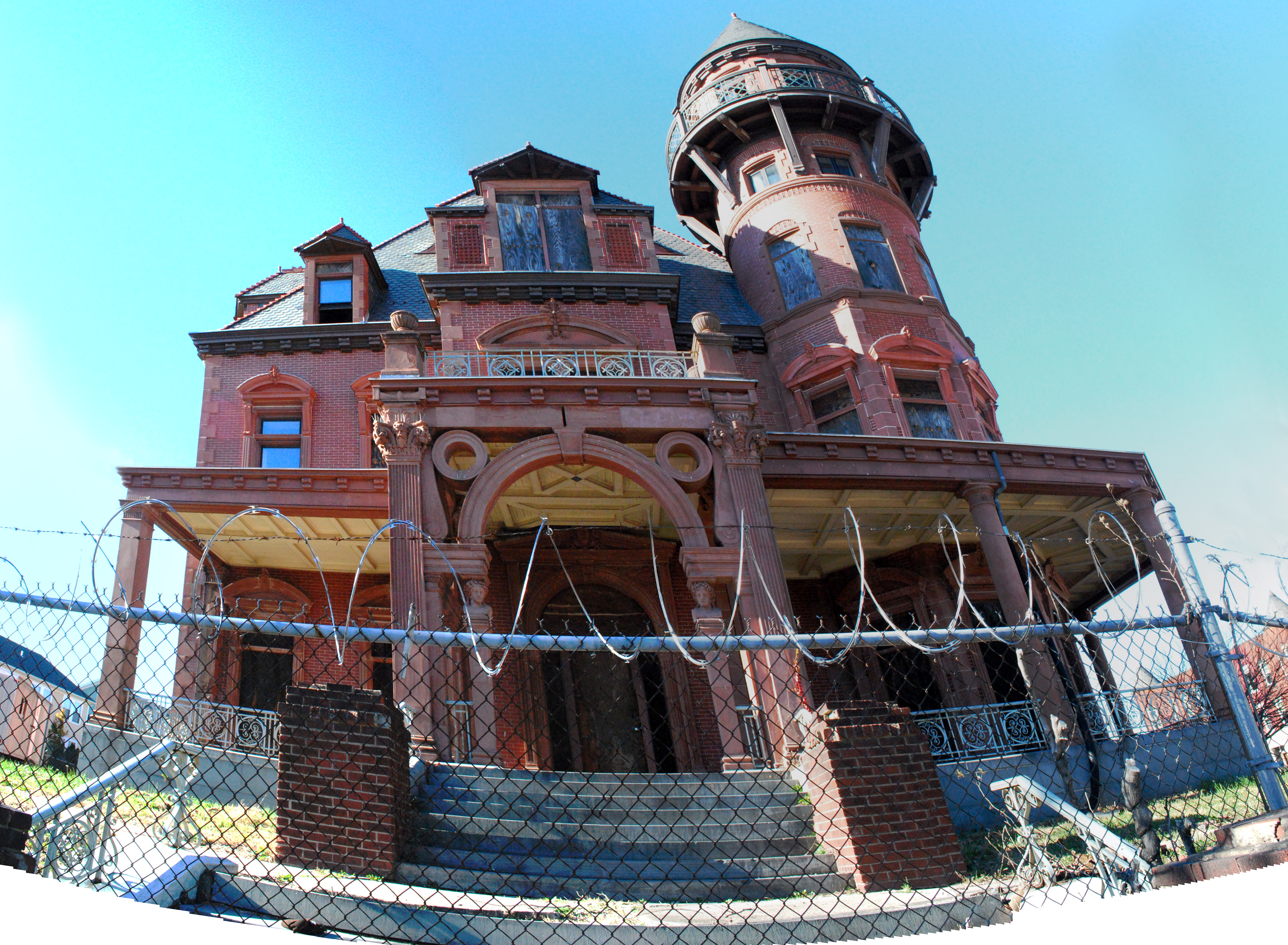
Front porch.

== In popular culture ==
- The design of the mansion is featured in the animated series The Venture Bros., as the Fitzcarraldo Mansion.

== See also ==
- National Register of Historic Places listings in Essex County, New Jersey
