= Gottfried Krueger Brewing Company =

Brewery in Newark, New Jersey (1858–1961)

Krueger Brewery
- Type: Brewery
- Location: Newark, New Jersey, U.S.
- Opened: 1858
- Closed: 1961
- Key people: Gottfried Krueger
- Other products: Ambassador Beer, Kent Ale, Krueger's Bock, Krueger's Cream Ale, Krueger's Finest Beer and Old Surrey Porter.

The Gottfried Krueger Brewing Company was a brewery in Newark, New Jersey founded by Gottfried Krueger and John Laible (Gottfried's uncle) in 1858. The company produced Krueger's Special Beer, the first beer to be sold in cans, in November 1933.

== History ==
Krueger's was founded in 1858, but its roots go further back. In 1851, Louis Adam and J. Braun met to form a new brewery, but Braun died, so Adam partnered with John Laible to form Laible & Adam. In 1851, Laible invited his nephew from Germany, Gottfried Krueger, then 16, to assist in the brewery. In 1858, Adam took over the brewery and Liable invested in Krueger, until 1865, when Krueger partnered with Gottlieb Hill to purchase Louis Adam's brewery under the Hill & Krueger banner. The brewery went from 4,000 to 25,000 barrels within 10 years. When Hill died in 1875, Krueger became sole owner and changed the brand to G. Krueger Brewing Company.

1882 began a time of success for Krueger. He joined a syndicate with Peter Hauck and Anton Hupfel to become the United States Brewing Company. Krueger then purchased a large stake in Lyons & Sons Brewery, The Home Brewing Co., Eagle Brewery, and Union Brewery. In 1908, United States Brewing bought Trefz Brewery (most known for the "River of Beer" incident in 1889) and Albany Brewery and produced more than 500,000 barrels a year. In 1914, Gottfried was visiting Germany when World War I broke out and was forced to remain there until the war ended. Prohibition forced the closure of the brewery and Gottfried died in 1926.

== Post Prohibition ==
During Prohibition, Krueger Brewing sold near beer (0.5% alcohol by weight) and soda. This gave them a distinct advantage when the Prohibition alcohol limit was increased to 3.2%, so the brewery was able to produce beer at 3.2% alcohol by weight into cups on the morning of April 7, 1933. According to one source, it took two days for the line in the front of the brewery to return to order.

In 1933, Krueger was the first company to produce beer in cans because of a partnership with the American Can Company. This was a risky move, so American Can offered to install the equipment for free and Krueger would only pay for it if the plan was successful. An initial test run of 2,000 cans filled with the 3.2% product were labeled "Krueger's Special Beer" and provided to brewery employees and friends of the brewery for evaluation. The enthusiastic reception encouraged them to release canned versions of their full-strength Krueger's Cream Ale and Krueger's Finest Beer brands to the public on January 24, 1935. These cans were originally shipped to Richmond, Virginia, the furthest point of Kreuger's distribution area, in case the experiment failed. Other canned products soon followed, including Krueger's Bock and Kent India Pale Ale.

By 1952, the Newark plant was producing one million barrels a year. The 1950s saw consolidation in the brewing industry, and breweries like Anheuser-Busch and Miller squeezed out market share. In 1961, Krueger was licensed to Narragansett Brewing until production ceased.

== See also ==
- List of defunct breweries in the United States
