= United States v. One Package of Japanese Pessaries =

American birth control legal case in 1936

- Court: United States Court of Appeals for the Second Circuit
- Full case name: United States of America v. One Package of Japanese Pessaries
- Decided: December 7, 1936
- Citation: 86 F.2d 737 (2d Cir. 1936)

Case history
- Prior history: Appeal from order dismissing case, S.D.N.Y. (13 F. Supp. 334)

Holding
- Comstock Act could not bar shipment of contraceptives made by the order of a licensed medical doctor. S.D.N.Y. affirmed.

Court membership
- Judges sitting: L. Hand, A. N. Hand, Swan

Case opinions
- Majority: A. N. Hand, joined by unanimous court

United States v. One Package of Japanese Pessaries, 86 F.2d 737 (2d Cir. 1936) (often just U.S. v. One Package), was an in rem United States Court of Appeals case in the Second Circuit involving birth control.

== Background ==
In 1873 Congress adopted the Comstock Act, which prohibited the importation or mailing of "obscene matter". The law's definition of obscene matter included contraceptives or information about contraception. In the 1930s, Margaret Sanger and the National Committee on Federal Legislation for Birth Control lobbied Congress to revise this law, but were unsuccessful.

== The case ==
Dr. Hannah Stone, at one of Sanger's clinics, ordered a new type of diaphragm (a pessary) from a Japanese physician to be shipped from Tokyo to the United States. Upon arrival in the United States the shipment was seized and confiscated under the Tariff Act of 1930, which had incorporated the anti-contraceptive provisions of the Comstock Act.

A lower court ruled against the government. When the government appealed to the United States Court of Appeals for the Second Circuit, the appellate court affirmed the lower court's ruling. The appellate court held that the law could not be used to intercept shipments which originated from a doctor. Judge Augustus Noble Hand wrote, in his decision:

While it is true that the policy of Congress has been to forbid the use of contraceptives altogether if the only purpose of using them be to prevent conception in cases where it would not be injurious to the welfare of the patient or her offspring, it is going far beyond such a policy to hold that abortions, which destroy incipient life, may be allowed in proper cases, and yet that no measures may be taken to prevent conception even though a likely result should be to require the termination of pregnancy by means of an operation. It seems unreasonable to suppose that the national scheme of legislation involves such inconsistencies and requires the complete suppression of articles, the use of which in many cases is advocated by such a weight of authority in the medical world.

== See also ==
- Birth control movement in the United States
