= Holland–Rantos =

Contraception company

Holland–Rantos was a company founded in the United States in 1925 by birth control advocates that manufactured high-quality contraceptives. Its primary product was the diaphragm, which was Margaret Sanger's recommended method of contraception. The company also sold a lubricating jelly under the name "vaginal jelly", based on a formula imported from Germany. In the 1940s, Holland–Rantos was bought by Young's Rubber Co., which manufactures the Trojan Condom. Around 2000, a new company HR Pharmaceuticals was founded, which sells lubricating jelly under the name "HR Jelly".
