= James H. Hubert =

American social worker (1886–1970)

James Henry Hubert (1886–1970) was a social worker and the Executive Secretary of the New York Urban League. In 1929, Hubert asked Margaret Sanger to open a birth control clinic in Harlem. He wrote for the periodical Opportunity: Journal of Negro Life Hubert died on April 29, 1970, in New York at the age of 84.
