= Levonorgestrel-releasing implant =

Subdermal birth control implant

Background
- Type: Hormonal; Progestogen implant
- First use: 1983 (Finland)
- Trade names: Norplant, Jadelle, Sino-implant (II), others

Failure rates (first year)
- Perfect use: 0.05%
- Typical use: 0.05%

Usage
- Duration effect: up to 5 years
- Reversibility: Provided correctly inserted
- User reminders: Alternative method required after 5 years
- Clinic review: 3 months following insertion

Advantages and disadvantages
- STI protection: No
- Weight: No proven effect
- Period disadvantages: irregular light spotting
- Benefits: No further user action needed

Medical notes
- Possible scarring and difficulty in removal

Levonorgestrel-releasing implant, sold under the brand name Jadelle among others, are devices that release levonorgestrel for birth control. It is one of the most effective forms of birth control with a one-year failure rate around 0.05%. The device is placed under the skin and lasts for up to five years. It may be used by women who have a history of pelvic inflammatory disease and therefore cannot use an intrauterine device. Following removal, fertility quickly returns.

It is generally well tolerated with few significant side effects. Side effects may include irregular menstrual periods, no periods, headaches, and breast pain. Use is not recommended in people with significant liver disease. The levonorgestrel implant is a type of long-acting reversible birth control. It primarily works by stopping ovulation and by thickening the mucus around the cervix.

A levonorgestrel-releasing implant was approved for medical use in 1983 in Finland and in the United States in 1990. It is on the World Health Organization's List of Essential Medicines. Levonorgestrel implants are approved in more than 60 countries and used by more than seven million women. As of 2015 it is approved but not available in the United States.

== Medical uses ==
Levonorgestrel-releasing implant is 99–99.95% effective at preventing pregnancy, and is one of the most reliable, though not the most available, forms of birth control. Levonorgestrel-releasing implant prevents pregnancy through multiple methods: by preventing ovulation, which means that no eggs are released for fertilization; by thickening the mucus of the cervix, which prevents sperm from entering; and by thinning the lining of the uterus, which makes implantation of an embryo less likely.

The way in which levonorgestrel-releasing implant causes these effects is by use of hormones. A small amount of the hormone progestin is released through the capsules continuously, more during the first year and a half, but then at a level similar to most contraceptive pills afterward. Like all hormonal contraception, levonorgestrel-releasing implant does not protect against sexually transmitted infections.

Implantable contraceptives are especially effective in the developing world, as they do not require daily administration or access to a hospital to be effective. In addition, no continual contraceptive supplies (pills, condoms, etc.) are necessary, and it is a highly effective, low cost contraceptive over the long term.

== Contraindications ==
Levonorgestrel-releasing implant should not be used in women with liver disease, breast cancer, or blood clots. Women who believe they may already be pregnant or those with vaginal bleeding should first see a physician. However, since it does not contain estrogen like some birth control pills, older women, women who smoke, and women with high blood pressure are not restricted from using the system.

== Side effects ==
After three months of using, women may need to schedule a follow-up appointment to monitor blood pressure and discuss any concerns. Side effects may include irregular menstrual periods for the first approximately three months, including periods lasting longer than normal, bleeding or spotting between periods, heavy bleeding, or going with no period for the mentioned period of time. Common side effects include weight gain, nervousness, anxiety, nausea, vomiting, mastalgia, dizziness, dermatitis/rash, hirsutism, scalp-hair loss, headache, depression, and acne. Sometimes, pain, itching or infection at the site of the implant will occur. Ovarian cysts may also occur, but usually do not require treatment, although they can cause pain even if benign.

== Technique ==
=== Insertion ===
Levonorgestrel-releasing implant is implanted under the skin in the upper arm (Note: usually on the medial (or inner) side of the non-dominant arm) of a woman, by creating a small incision and inserting the capsules in a fanlike shape. Insertion usually takes 15 minutes and the capsules can sometimes be seen under the skin, although usually they look like small veins. They can also be felt under the skin. Once inserted, the contraceptive works within 24 hours and lasts up to five years.

=== Removal ===
Levonorgestrel-releasing implant can be removed by creating a second incision and withdrawing the capsules. It is normally removed when the five-year period is over, or if:

- Pregnancy is desired
- Different birth control is preferred
- Complications arise

Normally removal is not complicated; removal difficulties have been reported with a frequency of 6.2%, based on 849 removals. Removal difficulties include: multiple incisions, capsule fragments remaining, pain, multiple visits, deep placement, lengthy removal procedure, or other.

If desired, a new implant can be inserted at the time of removal.

== History ==
It was developed by Sheldon J. Segal and Horacio Croxatto at the Population Council beginning in 1966, with the first clinical trial in Chile in 1974. It was first approved in Finland on November 23, 1983, where it was manufactured by Leiras Oy Pharmaceuticals. The original Norplant consisted of a set of six small (2.4 mm × 34 mm) silicone capsules, each filled with 36 mg of levonorgestrel implanted under the skin in the upper arm and effective for five years. The original (six-capsule) Norplant production has been phased out; USAID's contract ran until December 2006. The original (six capsule) Norplant was approved by the U.S. Food and Drug Administration (FDA) on December 10, 1990, and marketed in the United States in 1991 by Wyeth Pharmaceuticals. Norplant distribution in the United States ended in 2002; limited supplies still remained in the U.S. until 2004. Norplant was withdrawn from the UK market in 1999. Production of Norplant was discontinued globally in 2008.

Norplant II (Norplant-2, Jadelle), also developed by the Population Council and manufactured by Schering Oy, consists of two small (2.5 mm × 43 mm) silicone rods each containing 75 mg of levonorgestrel in a polymer matrix, instead of six capsules. It was approved May 31, 1996 by the FDA as being effective for three years; it was subsequently approved November 22, 2002 by the FDA as being effective for five years. Jadelle has not been marketed in the United States; Jadelle is the successor to the original Norplant in USAID's contract beginning January 2007.

== Society and culture ==
=== United States ===
By 1996, more than 50,000 women had filed lawsuits, including 70 class actions, against Wyeth or its subsidiaries, or doctors who prescribed Norplant. Wyeth never lost a Norplant lawsuit, even in cases which came before a jury.

On August 26, 1999, after winning 3 jury verdicts, 20 pretrial summary judgments and the dismissal of 14,000 claims, Wyeth offered out-of-court cash settlements of $1,500 each to about 36,000 women who contended that they had not been adequately warned about possible side effects of Norplant such as irregular menstrual bleeding, headaches, nausea and depression. Wyeth said that most of the plaintiffs experienced routine side effects described in Norplant's labeling information. Wyeth did not admit to any wrongdoing, saying the settlement offer "was purely a business decision," noting "our legal success has come at a steep price because lawsuits are time-consuming, expensive, and have a chilling effect on research," and that it would continue to offer Norplant and would contest "any and all new lawsuits aggressively."

About 32,000 women accepted the out-of-court $1,500 settlements. On August 14, 2002, Wyeth won partial summary judgment and dismissal of the claims of the 2,960 remaining plaintiffs who had not accepted Wyeth's out-of-court settlement offer.

In August 2000, Wyeth suspended shipments of Norplant in the United States because during regular quality assurance monitoring, representative samples of seven lots distributed beginning October 20, 1999 tested within product specifications, but at the lower end of the release rate specification for shelf life stability, raising concerns about those lots' contraceptive effectiveness. Wyeth recommended that women who had Norplant capsules from those lots implanted use backup contraception until they determined the clinical relevance of the atypically low levels of levonorgestrel release.

On July 26, 2002, Wyeth announced that data from investigations conducted in women with Norplant capsules from the suspect lots did not suggest less contraceptive effectiveness than that reported in clinical trials, and that therefore backup contraception could be safely discontinued. Wyeth also announced that due to limitations in product component supplies, they did not plan to resume marketing the six-capsule Norplant system in the United States.

=== New Zealand ===
Jadelle was added to the Pharmaceutical Management Agency's (Pharmac) schedule and subsequently subsidized in August 2010. Medical professionals raised concerns during a consultation process indicating preference for a product which is easier to insert. The agreement between Bayer New Zealand and Pharmac was conditional on Bayer New Zealand providing adequate training to ensure doctors are comfortable in the insertion and removal technique.

=== Controversy ===
Some American legislators have unsuccessfully attempted to provide financial incentives to women on welfare who agree to use Norplant. For example, in Kansas, Republican Kerry Patrick introduced legislation that would grant welfare recipients a one-time payment of $500 to use Norplant, followed by a $50 bonus each year the implants remained in place. Some judges have offered Norplant implants as a voluntary alternative to jail time for certain women convicted of child abuse or drug abuse during pregnancy.

Two days after the 1990 FDA approval of Norplant, an editorial in The Philadelphia Inquirer suggested reducing the size of the black underclass by offering welfare mothers increased benefits if they agreed to use Norplant. Eleven days later the Inquirer apologized for their "misguided and wrongheaded" editorial and for their suggestion of offering incentives for Norplant use.

Critics such as the ACLU argued that such uses are coercive and discriminatory, and compared such uses to early 20th-century American eugenics. In Killing the Black Body, black feminist Dorothy Roberts links such uses of Norplant to a "white mainstream" that is allegedly determined to "demonize, even criminalize" poor black women's lives and reproductive choices.

Within two years of Norplant's FDA approval, legislators in thirteen U.S. states had proposed nearly two dozen bills offering incentives for, or requiring use of Norplant by welfare mothers; none of these proposals passed.

The first big city to aggressively promote the use of Norplant was Baltimore. Baltimore targeted teenagers because the birthrate was three times higher than other states. In Baltimore, about ten percent of girls between ages 15 and 17 gave birth during 1990. Young mothers would often drop out of school and struggle to raise the child in poverty. The mayor at the time, Kurt Schmoke, pushed for laws that would give teen girls more access to Norplant. Norplant was eventually given to teen girls at schools without parental consent. Programs were designed for, and performed in, predominantly black schools. Laurence G. Paquin Middle School became the first school to provide Norplant to their students. Paquin Middle School had 355 female students but only 5 of them were not black. Their program started off as a pilot program and soon other urban high schools like San Fernando High School in Los Angeles and Crane High School in Chicago's West Side adopted the program of providing Norplant to their students. Because of a focus on predominantly black schools, questions of racism arose among black community leaders.

== See also ==
- Contraceptive patch
- Nexplanon, another subdermal contraceptive implant
