= Policing the Womb =

2020 book by Michele Goodwin

Policing the Womb: Invisible Women and the Criminalization of Motherhood
- First edition cover
- Author: Michele Goodwin
- Language: English
- Subject: Reproductive rights, pregnant women, women's rights, maternal welfare, law, legislation
- Publisher: Cambridge University Press
- Publication date: March 12, 2020
- Publication place: United States
- Media type: Print/digital
- Pages: 323
- ISBN: 110703017X
- OCLC: 1124796244

Policing the Womb: Invisible Women and the Criminalization of Motherhood is a nonfiction book by American scholar and law professor Michele Goodwin. The book details the criminalization of reproduction in United States and argues for choice movements to expand to a reproductive justice framework. It was released on March 12, 2020, by Cambridge University Press.

== Synopsis ==
Policing the Womb centers the criminalization of birth and other aspects of reproduction in the United States, such as contraception and abortion. Goodwin contextualizes the contemporary policing of reproduction within the history of American slavery and contends that women's bodies are treated as property by the American state. She describes fetal personhood legislation, the treatment of those who are incarcerated and pregnant, and many of other examples of criminal punishment for pregnant women throughout the book. She contends that this criminalization predominantly targets low-income women, Black, and Latina women by design, as these populations were never included in the vision of pro-choice movements, which center white middle-class women. Goodwin argues in favor of widening current "choice" movements to reproductive justice, an expansive framework inclusive of domains like abortion access, healthcare, and mass incarceration.

== Reception ==
Jane Richards of Lithub praised the book as "brilliant". In a positive review, Katha Pollitt wrote in The Washington Post: "“Policing the Womb” contains the best explanation I’ve read for the necessity of reproductive justice, not just reproductive rights." Writing for Boston Review, Abby Minor stated, "Just as Michelle Alexander’s The New Jim Crow brought public attention to how the prison system reproduces the conditions of racial slavery, Policing the Womb exposes a new era of reproductive policing and harm in the United States that has gone largely unnoticed, even while it repeats histories of eugenics and forced reproduction." J. Porter Lillis hailed the research in a review for Journal of Social Work Values and Ethics: "The book is an excellent, thoroughly researched text, particularly in respect to case law and case histories. This text does better than just presenting the law, it also provides the personal vignettes and stories of the women impacted by these laws."

== Accolades ==
- Outstanding Academic Titles for 2021, Choice Reviews

== Publication ==
- Goodwin, Michele (12 March 2020). Policing the Womb: Invisible Women and the Criminalization of Motherhood. Cambridge University Press. ISBN 978-1107030176.

== See also ==
- Killing the Black Body
- The Girls Who Went Away
