= Gregory Shaffer =

International Law legal scholar

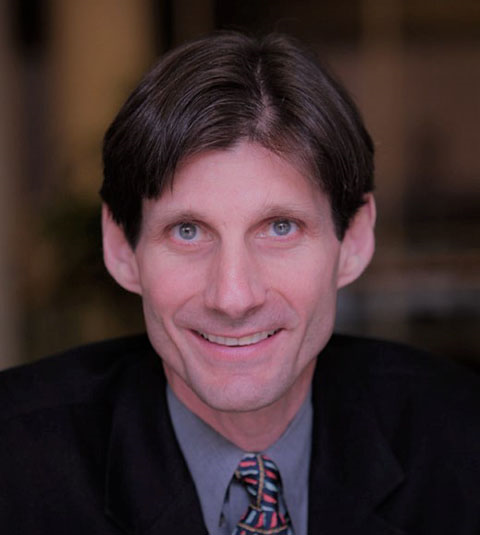
- Education: Dartmouth College (BA); Stanford University (JD)
- Occupation: Scott K. Ginsburg Professor of International Law at the Georgetown University Law Center
- Known for: International Law; International Trade Law; Globalization; World Trade Organization
- Website: Gregory Shaffer's Website

Gregory Shaffer is the Scott K. Ginsburg Professor of International Law at the Georgetown University Law Center. From 2022-2024 he served as President of the American Society of International Law. He is known for his work on international law, with a specialization on international trade law, and law and globalization.

== Biography ==
Shaffer was born in Cincinnati, Ohio. He holds a B.A. from Dartmouth College and a J.D. from Stanford Law School. He previously was a Chancellor's Professor of Law at the University of California, Irvine School of Law, was a Melvin C. Steen Professor of Law at the University of Minnesota Law School, held the inaugural Wing-Tat Lee Chair at Loyola University Chicago School of Law, and was a professor at the University of Wisconsin Law School, where he was Co-Director of the Center on World Affairs and the Global Economy and of the European Union Center of Excellence.

== Professional work ==
Before entering academia, Shaffer was a member of the Paris bar, working at the law firms of Coudert Frères and Bredin Prat.

== Personal life ==
Shaffer is married to Michele Goodwin, author, advocate and law professor. They have two children.

== Scholarship ==
Shaffer is a leading international trade expert, author, and consultant on the World Trade Organization (WTO), European Union law, globalization, transnational legal orders, and transnational legal ordering. He introduced the concepts of public-private partnerships and legal capacity in the WTO dispute settlement system, examining how they work in practice in the United States, the European Union, Brazil, India, and China. Shaffer has written major books on the international law and politics governing genetically modified foods, transatlantic relations, and works in the tradition of legal realism and socio-legal studies. His publications include nine books and over 100 articles and book chapters, including, Emerging Powers and the World Trading System: The Past and Future of International Economic Law (2021), Constitution-Making and Transnational Legal Order (Ginsburg and Halliday, 2019), Transnational Legal Orders (Halliday, 2015), and Transnational Legal Ordering and State Change (2013).

== Selected writings ==
=== Books ===
- Emerging Powers and the World Trading System: The Past and Future of International Economic Law (2021)
- Constitution-Making and Transnational Legal Order (Ginsburg and Halliday, 2019)
- Transnational Legal Orders (Halliday, 2015)
- Transnational Legal Ordering and State Change (2013)
- Transnational Legal Orders, Cambridge University Press (with Terence Halliday).
- Transnational Legal Ordering and State Change, Cambridge University Press.
- Dispute Settlement at the WTO: The Developing Country Experience, Cambridge University Press.
- When Cooperation Fails: The International Law and Politics of Genetically Modified Foods, Oxford University Press.
- Defending Interests: Public-Private Partnerships in WTO Litigation, Brookings Institution Press.
- Transatlantic Governance in the Global Economy, Rowman & Littlefield.

=== Articles ===
- The Empirical Turn in International Legal Scholarship, 106 American Journal of International Law 1 (with Tom Ginsburg).
- Transnational Legal Process and State Change, 37 Law and Social Inquiry 229-264.
- Hard vs. Soft Law: Alternatives, Complements and Antagonists in International Governance, 94 Minnesota Law Review 706-799 (with Mark A. Pollack).
- Varieties of New Legal Realism: Can a New World Order Prompt a New Legal Theory?, 95 Cornell Law Review 61 (with Victoria Nourse).
- Other Publications on SSRN
