= Chaka (novel) =

1925 Sesotho-language novel by Thomas Mofolo

- Author: Thomas Mofolo
- Language: Sesotho
- Publisher: Morija Sesuto Book Depot
- Publication date: December 1925
- Publication place: Lesotho
- Pages: 288

Chaka is the third and final novel by Lesotho writer Thomas Mofolo. Written in Sesotho, it is a mythic fictional retelling of the story of the rise and fall of the Zulu emperor-king Shaka. Following its first publication in 1925, it was published in English translation in 1931.

== Publication history ==
Chaka was written in three years, from 1907 to 1910. To gather material for his novel, Thomas Mofolo made several trips to the South African province of Natal, including one in 1909 where he visited the grave of Shaka. The original Sotho manuscript was first submitted in 1910 to the Morija Sesuto Book Depot supported by the Paris Evangelical Missionary Society (PEMS), but was only published in 1925. The delay in publication was due to the publishers' being "disturbed by Mofolo's failure to condemn pagan tribal customs"; this led to a disheartened Mofolo's retirement from writing. According to translator Daniel P. Kunene, who translated Chaka from Sesotho to English, at least two chapters revolving around the traditions and history of the Zulu people were omitted from the published version of the novel.

The first English translation of Chaka was published in 1931, while the earliest French and German translations were published in 1940 and 1953 respectively; an Afrikaans translation was published in 1974. It has also been translated into other languages, such as Swahili, Italian, and Spanish.

The top half of the 11 December 1925 issue of the Lesotho-based periodical/newspaper Leselinyana la Lesotho announcing Chaka's publication.

== Reception ==
The novel received a polarised reception initially, with some readers accusing the author of being anti-Christian, in contrast to others who felt that Chaka was "deeply Christian in inspiration and intent". Nonetheless, Chaka became a local and international bestseller.

Moreover, especially since the publication of Daniel P. Kunene's English translation of Chaka, the novel has become increasingly appreciated for its literary value. In a review for English in Africa, Neil Lazarus described Chaka as an "extraordinary and enigmatic work of literature ... demanding the close attention of all scholars of African literature." In February 2002, Chaka was named one of the twelve best works of African literature of the 20th century by a panel organised by Ali Mazrui as part of the Zimbabwe International Book Fair.

== English translations ==
- Chaka: An Historical Romance, trans. F. H. Dutton (International African Institute, 1931). Shortened and simplified as Chaka the Zulu, with illustrations by Eleanor Watkins (Oxford, 1949)
- Chaka, trans. Daniel P. Kunene (Heinemann, 1981)

== Bibliography ==
- Bodunde, Charles A. (June 1993). "Literary Portraits of Chaka: Thomas Mofolo and Mazisi Kunene" (PDF). African Study Monographs. 14 (1): 13–22.
- Gérard, Albert (May 1986). "Rereading "Chaka"". English in Africa. 13 (1): 1–12. JSTOR 40238579.
- Lazarus, Neil (May 1986). "The Logic of Equivocation in Thomas Mofolo's "Chaka"". English in Africa. 13 (1). Rhodes University: 41–60. JSTOR 40238581.
