= Michele Goodwin =

American legal scholar

- Goodwin at Politics and Prose in 2026
- Born: July 29, 1970 (age 56)
- Spouse: Gregory Shaffer
- Children: 2
- Relatives: Daniel Kunene (adopted father)
- Awards: American Bar Association Margaret Brent Award (2022)

Academic background
- Education: University of Wisconsin–Madison; Boston College Law School

Academic work
- Institutions: Georgetown University Law Center; University of California, Irvine

Michele Bratcher Goodwin (born July 29, 1970) is an American legal scholar whose expertise is in the fields of bioethics and health law. She was the Chancellor's Professor of Law and director of the Center for Biotechnology and Global Health Policy at the University of California, Irvine School of Law.

Goodwin is currently the Linda D. & Timothy J. O’Neill Professor of Constitutional Law and Global Health Policy at Georgetown University Law Center.

== Education ==
Goodwin received her Bachelor of Arts degree from the University of Wisconsin–Madison in 1992, with a triple major in sociology, anthropology, and African languages & literature. She then attended Boston College Law School, where she received her Juris Doctor in 1995. After returning to the University of Wisconsin–Madison, from which she received her LL.M degree in 2000, she was a Gilder Lehrman postdoctoral fellow at Yale University for one year. In 2004, she received her SJD degree, also from the University of Wisconsin–Madison.

== Career ==
Goodwin joined the Georgetown Law faculty in August 2023. Goodwin previously served as the Everett Fraser Professor at the University of Minnesota. In 2020–21, Goodwin received the University of California's highest honor, the Distinguished Senior Faculty Award for Research. In 2022, she received the Margaret Brent Award from the American Bar Association. Professor Goodwin has also been a Visiting Professor at the University of Chicago and University of Virginia law schools.

== Personal life ==
Goodwin is married to Gregory Shaffer, who is also a professor at the University of California, Irvine. They have two children. She is the adopted daughter of Daniel Kunene.
