= Melvin Steen =

American lawyer

Melvin C. Steen (1907 – 1992) was an American attorney and founding partner of the New York law firm Cleary Gottlieb Steen & Hamilton. Steen graduated from the University of Minnesota Law School, where the Melvin C. Steen Professorship, currently held by Gregory Shaffer, is named in his honor. His survivors included his son Gordon of Owings Mills, Maryland.

Over the years, Steen's law partnerships have included Henry Friendly and George W. Ball.
