= William Sanger =

American architect (1873–1961)

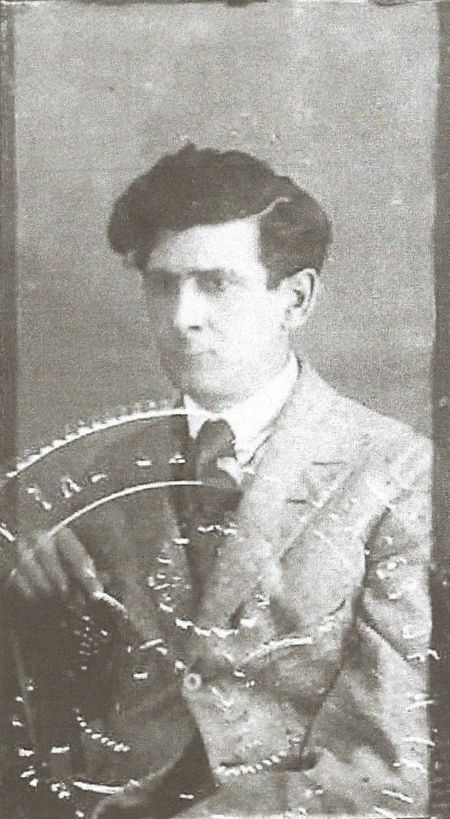
William Sanger

William Sanger (November 12, 1873 – July 23, 1961) was a German-born and American-educated architect and artist. An activist in the radical movement during the first decades of the 20th century, Sanger is best known as the first husband of birth control activist Margaret Sanger and as the defendant in a high-profile 1915 New York obscenity trial for distributing a birth control information pamphlet.

== Early life and education ==
Born in Berlin, Germany, Sanger came from a devoutly Jewish family which moved to the United States in about 1878.

He was educated in architecture from 1893 to 1895 at The Cooper Union in New York City. He later studied architecture at Atelier Masquery and the Society Beaux-Arts Architects. Sanger was further educated in painting at the Art Students League of New York and the Artists-Artisans Institute.

== Personal life and activism ==
Sanger married Margaret Sanger (née Higgins) on August 18, 1902. Together they joined the Socialist Party of New York and were involved in labor actions such as the 1913 Paterson silk strike. He was also an unsuccessful candidate for New York City Board of Aldermen in 1911, coming in a distant third place.

William Sanger was arrested January 19, 1915, for handing out a copy of Margaret Sanger's 1914 pamphlet on birth control, Family Limitation. In a statement before the Court of Special Sessions in New York City on September 10, 1915, William Sanger identified emotionally with his wife's work and referred to Anthony Comstock as a victim of "incurable sexophobia" who lacked "the intelligence to distinguish between pornography and scientific information."

The judge in the trial stated, "Your crime is not only a violation of the laws of man, but of the law of God as well, in your scheme to prevent motherhood ... If some persons would go around and urge Christian women to bear children, instead of wasting their time on woman suffrage, this city and society would be better off."

Supporters in the courtroom and outside broke into protest, particularly outraged when Sanger was not allowed to read a 7,000 word statement he had written into the public record. The judge's statement intensified interest in the case and redefined the issue as a dispute about women's roles rather than about obscenity as was previously viewed through the anti birth control propaganda of Anthony Comstock. The trial and following protests set a new tone for public debate about birth control.

Found guilty of distributing "obscene" material, Sanger was sentenced to a $150 fine or 30 days in jail — choosing the latter option to emphasize the political statement being made.

The result of the trial inspired Margaret Sanger to return to the United States to face charges levied in a previous grand jury indictment and to stand trial herself.

The couple divorced in 1921.
