= The Pivot of Civilization =

1922 book by Margaret Sanger

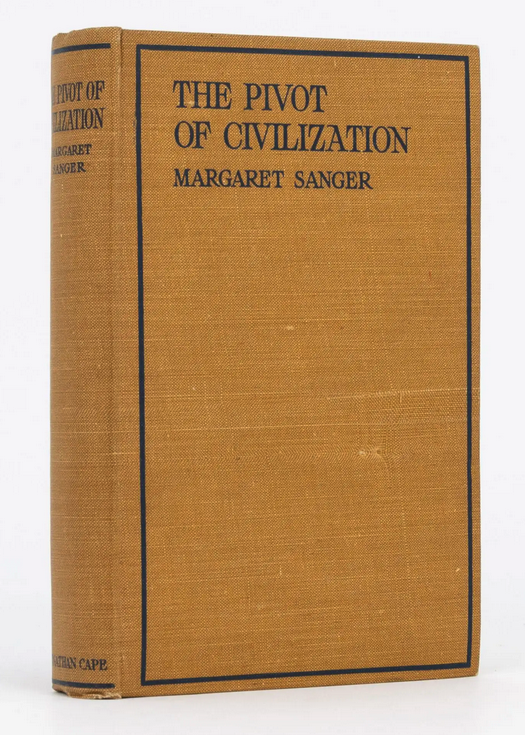
Sanger's 1922 book, The Pivot of Civilization

The Pivot of Civilization is a book written by Margaret Sanger that is considered by some as her most important work. In Pivot Sanger promotes concepts that help advance and popularize the notion of birth control.

== Overview ==
Using her background in medicine, Sanger highlights the relation between disease and suffering caused by unwanted pregnancies and urges for women's rights and medical rights over personal control of contraceptive remedies.

When Pivot was published in 1922, Publishers Weekly wrote about it that "Mrs. Sanger, with her extraordinary breadth of outlook and the real scientific quality of her mind, has lifted this question from out of the warm atmosphere of troubled domesticity to its proper level of a predominantly important human affair."
