= Killing the Black Body =

1997 book by Dorothy Roberts

- Front cover
- Author: Dorothy Roberts
- Subject: Slavery, race, reproductive rights
- Genre: Non-fiction
- Publisher: Pantheon Books
- Publication place: United States
- Pages: 373 pages
- ISBN: 9780679442264

Killing the Black Body: Race, Reproduction, and the Meaning of Liberty is a 1997 book by the American sociologist Dorothy Roberts in which she analyzes the reproductive rights of black women in the United States throughout history. The book details a history of reproductive oppression from the commodification of enslaved women's fertility to forced sterilizations of African American and Latina women in the 20th century. Through these accounts, Roberts makes the case that reproductive justice is a necessary part of the greater struggle for racial equality.

== Background ==
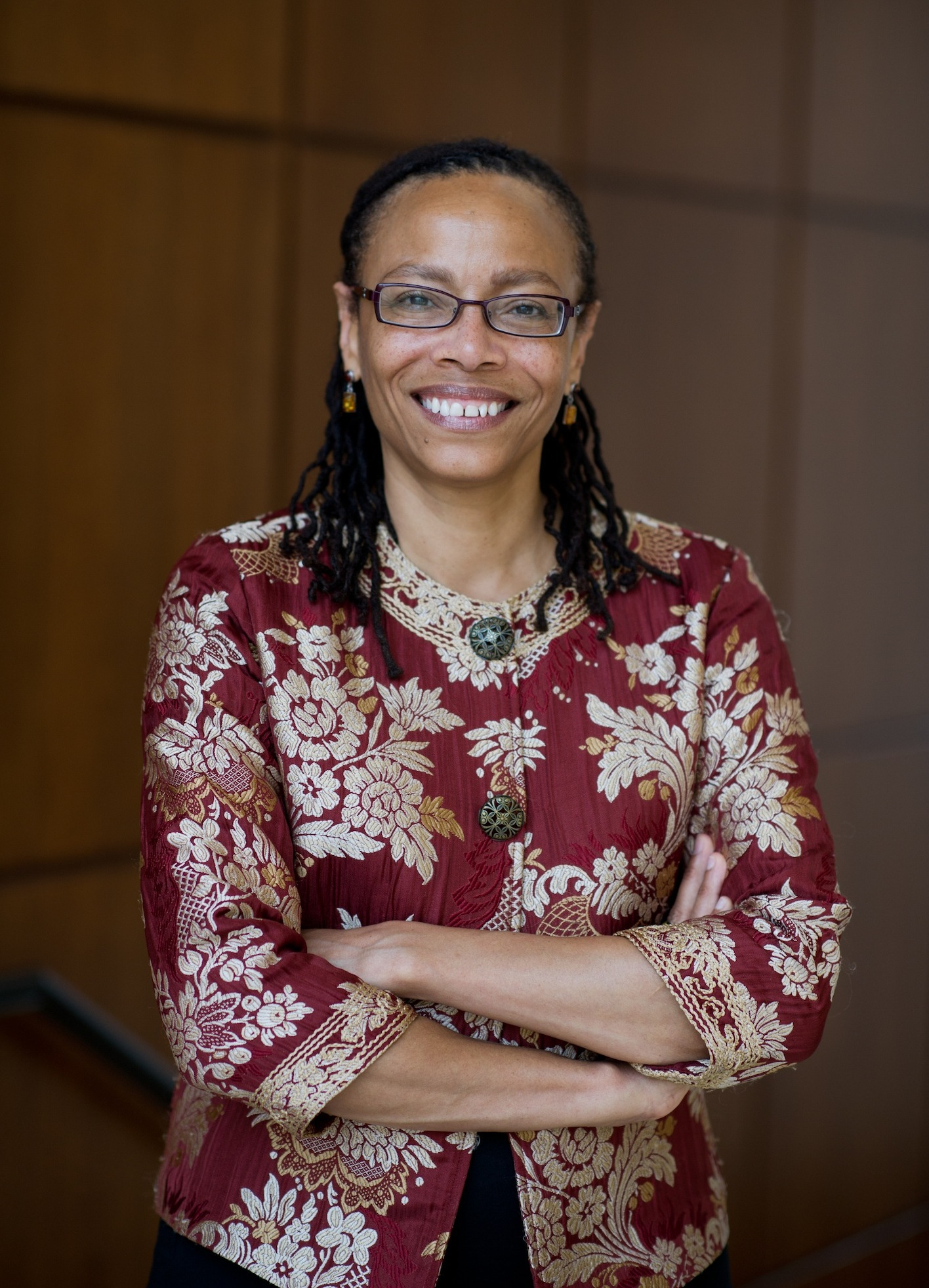
Author Dorothy Roberts, pictured in 2012

Dorothy Roberts wrote Killing the Black Body during her time as a law professor at Rutgers University, where she studied issues of gender, race, and class. Killing the Black Body was published in hardcover on 9 October 1997 by Pantheon Books. In 1998, Vintage Publishing released the paperback of Killing the Black Body.

== Synopsis ==
Roberts argues that institutional violence against black women and their reproductive autonomy in modern America has been present since slavery began in America. Female slaves were often brought from Africa to America for breeding, where their white male owners would rape them and sell their children for profit. The book details the life of Anna J. Cooper, who was born a slave and became an academic and an activist.

Roberts also details the alliance between Margaret Sanger, an early American birth control advocate, and the eugenics movement of the early 20th century, in order to illustrate how the rhetoric around contraceptives shifted from reproductive freedom to limiting the fertility of poor women of color. Women's movements for contraception were supported by eugenicists who used contraception to decrease birth rates amongst the black and Latina population in the South. Such efforts were aided by anti-miscegenation laws that criminalized interracial marriage or intercourse. Hysterectomies of black women which served no medical purpose, but sterilized the women, continued into the 1970s.

In a similar case, Roberts describes Norplant, a Levonorgestrel-releasing implant used for birth control. She documents the court-ordered implantation of Norplant by doctors and healthcare organizations into black women living in urban areas. She argues that the War on Poverty initiated by Lyndon B. Johnson disproportionately affected black single mothers, who had higher rates of poverty. Roberts also describes the prosecution of drug usage among pregnant mothers under the crime of drug trafficking to a minor—their fetus. Roberts cites a study which found that Black women were ten times more likely to be reported to law enforcement for drug usage than white women, despite marginally higher drug usage amongst white women.

Finally, Roberts outlines initiatives to change the treatment of black women in America, writing that reproductive justice cannot occur without addressing racial oppression. She critiques liberalism for its focus on individual access to reproductive technologies over broader socioeconomic disparities. Roberts believes that money spent on in vitro fertilisation could be better redirected to improve reproductive rights of a greater number of women. For example, Roberts advocates that greater resources be dedicated to reducing common causes of infertility, such as chlamydia. She also asserts that conversations about reproductive liberty should include mention of prenatal care being available to pregnant people as a right and opposition to state funding for abortions for women on benefits. Overall, Roberts advocates that reproductive liberty be defined in terms of freedom from social coercion, and the provision of material support for women of color to exercise their right to bear children, rather than simply the freedom to terminate an unwanted pregnancy.

== Reception ==
A starred review for Kirkus Reviews summarized the book as "brilliant, controversial, and profoundly valuable". The reviewer praised that "Roberts's arguments are especially convincing because they are so well researched and thoroughly dissected" and found that her "knowledge of her subject is total". Isis's Susan L. Smith summarized the book as "a well-written, passionate and enlightening exploration of the impact of racial politics on reproduction". Smith found that Roberts was "at her best when commenting on the contemporary era", but criticized the lack of "examples of black women's resistance" and the "rather unsatisfactory repetition" of historical material which has been studied by Deborah Gray White and Angela Davis.

Sherri L. Barnes of Feminist Collections reviewed the book as "readable by and accessible to general and academic audiences". She praised that Roberts wrote with "great compassion and sensitivity, presenting multiple perspectives". Karen D. Zivi said that although Roberts "made a brilliant start at illustrating the workings of a raced and classed maternal ideology" in punitive law enforcement and conception of reproductive rights, she should have been more critical of "her own notion of reproductive liberty". A writer for Canadian Woman Studies found the book "invaluable as a feminist resource in any classroom". The review praised Roberts for "remarkable sensitivity" in discussing differences between the rights of individuals and the rights of groups such as black women. It found the discussion of slave breeding "perhaps too extensive".

== See also ==
- Policing the Womb
