= Daniel Kunene =

South African literary scholar, translator, and writer

Daniel Pule Kunene (1923–2016) was a South African literary scholar, translator, and writer. He was Emeritus Professor of African Languages and Literature at the University of Wisconsin-Madison.

== Life ==
Daniel Pule Kunene was born on April 13, 1923, in Edenville, South Africa. He gained a BA in 1949 from the University of South Africa, an MA in 1951 from the University of Cape Town and a PhD in 1961 from the University of Cape Town. He married Selina Sekhuthe in 1953. In 1963 he and his family left South Africa, finding political asylum in the United States after a stay in London.

Kunene taught at UW Madison for 33 years. He also taught at the University of Cape Town, the University of London, the University of California, Los Angeles, and the Johannes Gutenberg University of Mainz.

He published 16 books and monographs in English and Sesotho, as well as hundreds of other publications. His books include the memoir: Kero Court Chronicles: Memoirs of Daniel P. Kunene (2015); fiction: Dawn To Twilight (2013); Dithoko, Dithothokiso le Dithohetletso tsa Sesotho (1996); From the Pit of Hell to the Spring of Life (1986); poetry: The Rock at the Corner of My Heart (2009); A Seed Must Seem to Die (1981); Pirates Have Become our Kings (1978); theatre: The Mandela Saga (1991); translation: Thomas Mofolo’s Pitseng: The Search for True Love (2013); CLS Nyembezi’s My Child! My Child! (2010); Thomas Mofolo’s Chaka (1981); and scholarship: The Zulu Novels of CLS. Nyembezi: A Critical Appraisal (2007); Thomas Mofolo and the Emergence of Written Sesotho Prose (1989); The Ideophone in Southern Sotho (1978); Heroic Poetry of the Basotho (1971); The Beginning of South African Vernacular Literature: A Historical Study (1967); and The Sound System of Southern Sotho (1961).

He was awarded the Sol T Plaatje Translation Award by the English Academy of Southern Africa in 2011, the Karel Čapek Award by the International Federation of Translators the same year. In 1995 he was awarded the Shuter and Shooter Prize for Literature .

In summer 1993 Kunene toured South Africa, his first chance to return after three decades of exile. His wife Selina died in October 1993. In 2003 he married again, to Marci Ellis. He died on May 27, 2016.

== Works ==
- Dithoko, dithothokiso le dithoholetso tsa sesotho. Cape Town: Oxford University Press, 1966.
- The works of Thomas Mofolo : summaries and critiques : a forerunner of A digest of African vernacular literatures, 1967
- The beginning of South African vernacular literature: A historical study.
- Heroic poetry of the Basotho, 1971
- Pirates have become our kings: poems. Nairobi, Kenya : East African Pub. House, 1978.
- The ideophone in Southern Sotho, Berlin: Reimer, 1978.
- (tr.) Chaka by Thomas Mofolo. 1980.
- A seed must seem to die, 1981
- From the pit of Hell to the spring of life, 1984
- Thomas Mofolo and the emergence of written Sesotho prose, 1989
- The Zulu novels of C.L.S. Nyembezi : a critical appraisal. Lewiston, N.Y.: Edwin Mellen Press, 2007.
