= Dorothy Roberts =

American sociologist (born 1956)

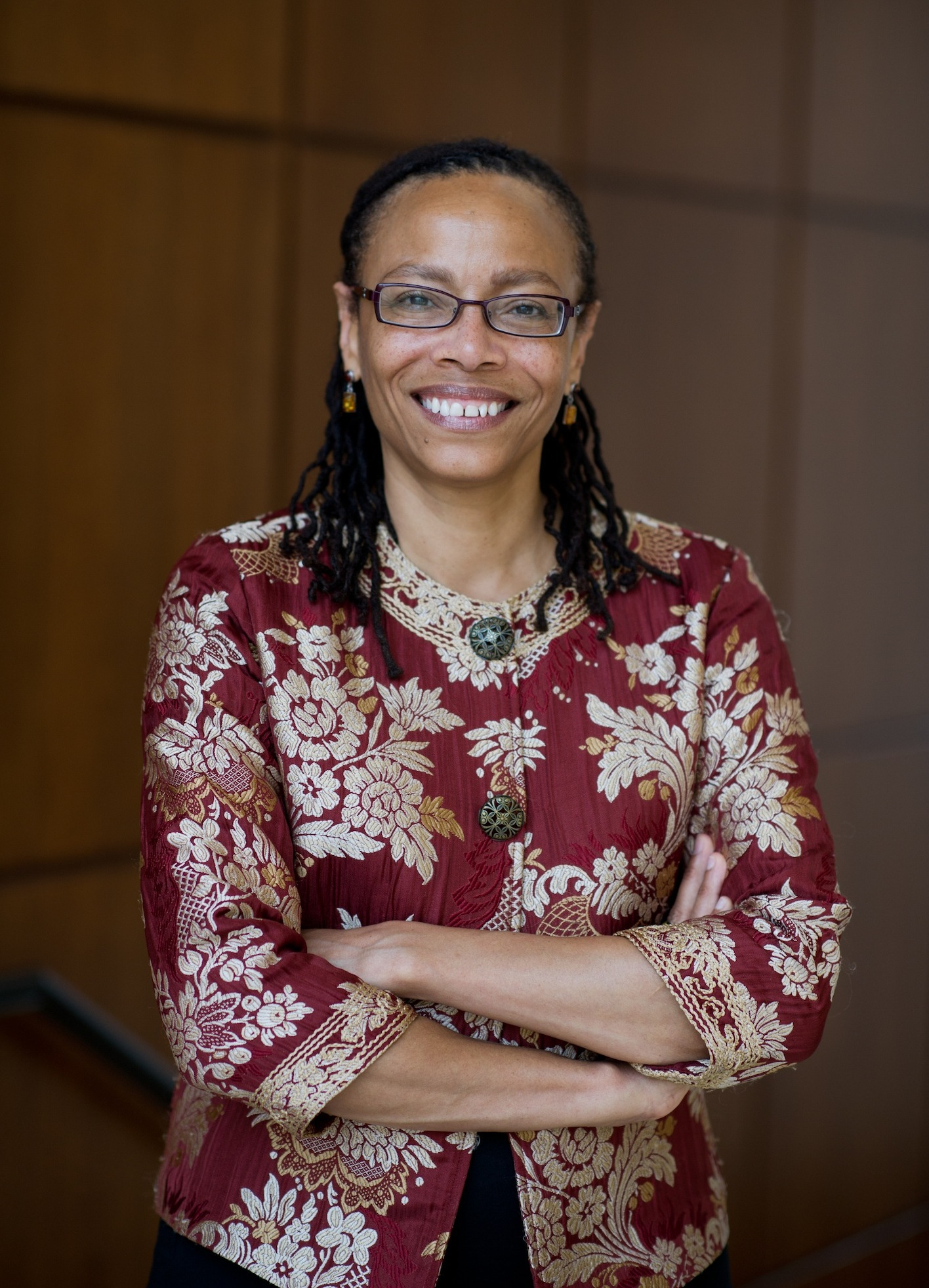
- Born: Dorothy E. Roberts; March 8, 1956 (age 70); Chicago, Illinois, U.S.
- Education: Yale University (BA); Harvard University (JD)
- Employer: University of Pennsylvania

Dorothy E. Roberts (born March 8, 1956) is an American sociologist, law professor, and social justice advocate. She is the Penn Integrates Knowledge Professor, George A. Weiss University Professor, and inaugural Raymond Pace and Sadie Tanner Mossell Alexander Professor of Civil Rights at the University of Pennsylvania. She writes and lectures on gender, race, and class in legal issues. Her focuses include reproductive health, child welfare, and bioethics. In 2023, she was elected to the American Philosophical Society. She has published over 80 articles and essays in books and scholarly journals, including Harvard Law Review, Yale Law Journal, and Stanford Law Review. She is a 2024 recipient of the MacArthur "Genius Grant".

== Background ==
Roberts was born in 1956 in Chicago, Illinois, to a white father, Robert Roberts, and Jamaican-born black mother, Iris, who raised her in a politically active household in Hyde Park. Her father was an anthropologist, and her mother was his research assistant. The two researched interracial marriages, and conducted hundreds of interviews of interracial couples. Roberts' parents met at the University of Chicago, where her father was her mother's professor in her PhD program. (She left without finishing her degree to care for their children).

Roberts received her Bachelor of Arts, magna cum laude, from Yale University in 1977, where she was also elected to Phi Beta Kappa. She then attended Harvard Law School, receiving her Juris Doctor in 1980. Roberts met her former husband, Coltrane Chimurenga (born Randolph Simms) when they were both students at Harvard. They had two sons, Amilcar and Camillo, before Chimurenga died in 2019. Following law school, she clerked for Judge Constance Baker Motley in the U.S. District Court for the Southern District of New York.

== Professional career ==
=== Lecturer and professor ===
From 1988 to 1994, Roberts was an associate professor of law at Rutgers University School of Law-Newark, and from 1994 to 1998, she was a professor of law and was elected twice to serve as the faculty graduation speaker in both 1992 and 1996.

She was also a visiting associate professor at the University of Pennsylvania Law School in 1994, and a fellow at the Harvard University Program in Ethics and the Professions from 1994 to 1995, as well as a visiting professor at the Northwestern University School of Law in 1997.

In 1998, she joined the faculty of Northwestern University School of Law with a joint appointment as a faculty fellow at the Institute for Policy Research. She was voted outstanding first-year course professor by the class of 2000 then being named the Kirkland & Ellis Professor in 2002.

While faculty at Northwestern, Roberts was visiting professor at Stanford Law School in 1998 as a Fulbright Fellow at the Centre for Gender and Development Studies at the University of the West Indies where she travel to Trinidad & Tobago from 2002 to 2003 to conduct research.

She also was appointed the Bacon-Kilkenny Distinguished Visiting professor at the Fordham University School of Law in 2006.

In 2019, Roberts gave the Betsy Wood Knapp '64 Lecture at Wellesley College. Her topic for this lecture was "The Problem with Race-Based Medicine." In the lecture, Roberts asserts that race, in medicine, is used as a proxy for the more complex aspects of health and disease that should require further investigation. Roberts notes that this topic is especially relevant in the age of genomic science where the desire is to reduce all aspects of disease and infection to a genetic origin. According to Roberts, this is an inaccurate assumption and can powerfully impact the medical treatment of women, children, and African-Americans.

Roberts later joined as faculty at the University of Pennsylvania, where she remains a professor at the law school and sociology department and is the founding director of the Penn Program on Race, Science & Society. Her scholarship focuses on race, gender, bioethics, and the intersection of law and social justice, particularly concerning reproductive rights, child welfare, and systemic inequalities in health care.

=== Author ===
Roberts has published more than 50 articles and essays in books, scholarly journals, newspapers, and magazines, including Harvard Law Review, Yale Law Journal, University of Chicago Law Review, Social Text, and The New York Times. She has explored topics such as race, reproduction, and motherhood in her scholarship, specifically focusing on the experiences of Black women.

Her article, "Punishing Drug Addicts Who Have Babies: Women of Color, Equality, and the Right of Privacy" (Harvard Law Review, 1991), has been widely cited. Invention (The New Press, 2011) argues that America is once again on the brink of classifying population by race.

Roberts has received much praise for her work from notable sources such as Publishers Weekly and Anthony D. Romero, executive director, American Civil Liberties Union.

=== Leadership roles ===
She serves as chair of the board of directors of the Black Women's Health Imperative, on the board of directors of the National Coalition for Child Protection Reform, and on the advisory boards of the Center for Genetics and Society and Family Defense Center. She also serves on a national panel that is overseeing foster care reform in Washington State and on the Standards Working Group of the California Institute for Regenerative Medicine (stem cell research). She has received awards from the National Science Foundation and the Robert Wood Johnson Foundation.

== Views ==
=== State violence, white supremacy, and imperialism ===
Roberts has drawn parallels between what she sees as current U.S. imperialism and white supremacy. She has drawn parallels between U.S. imperialism and white supremacy, arguing that state violence—whether through mass incarceration, family separation, or reproductive control—has historically been used to uphold racial hierarchies. She has asserted that U.S. torture of terrorist suspects is a tool to maintain supremacy just as violence has been used to maintain white supremacy. She has also compared the treatment of prisoners at Abu Ghraib prison to racist lynchings of Black Americans, emphasizing the ways in which state-sanctioned violence perpetuates systemic oppression.

=== Criminalization of black families and communities ===
Roberts has asserted that women should be able to choose if they bear a child and how they raise it, advocating for reproductive justice. However, she notes that these decisions are often dependent on the social conditions in which women live, any discrimination they face, and whether they value the idea of childbearing. Roberts also concludes that this choice, along with the choice to have a relationship with the child, must be respected by the state and by society, which does not happen to Black women who are often subject to government interference during their parenthood. In her views on reproductive justice, Roberts includes issues of social justice as well in order to ensure that women and men, regardless of race or socioeconomic status, are able to make independent, informed reproductive decisions when it comes to whether or not to have children and their relationships with their children.

Roberts contends that the same racial ideologies that justify punitive welfare policies and the over-policing of Black communities also shape disparities in healthcare and family regulation. She critiques policies that criminalize Black mothers, from welfare reform to child protection services, arguing that these systems disproportionately surveil and penalize Black families rather than offering support. She frames the foster care and criminal justice systems as interconnected institutions that work to control and separate Black families.

=== Race, medicine, and bioethics ===
Roberts has also been a strong critic of the intersection of race and medical science, particularly the ways in which genetic research, biotechnology, and pharmaceutical industries reinforce the false notion of race as a biological category. In Fatal Invention, she warns that race-based medical research and genetic testing perpetuate racial myths under the guise of scientific objectivity. She argues that health disparities stem from social inequalities rather than inherent genetic differences, and that medical racism continues to shape race-specific treatments and policies, reinforcing existing hierarchies rather than addressing structural inequities in healthcare.

=== Political advocacy ===
Roberts has been a vocal critic of global injustices, often drawing connections between racial oppression in the U.S. and state violence in international contexts. Following Oct. 7, 2023, Roberts signed a letter alongside other sociologists condemning Israel's actions in Gaza. The letter accused Israel of engaging in "genocide and ethnic cleansing" and labeled it an "apartheid regime."

== Academic contributions ==
Roberts work explores the intersections of race, gender, and the law, with a particular focus on reproductive justice, bioethics, and the carceral state. She has authored four influential books that critically examine the impacts of race on reproductive rights, family regulation, and medical ethics, shaping discourse in legal and social justice fields.

=== Killing the Black Body ===
Roberts wrote Killing the Black Body on history of punitive policies directed towards African American women that have sought to control Black women's reproductive autonomy in the United States . Roberts traces these practices from slavery, where Black women were forced to reproduce for economic gain, to 20th-century eugenics programs that promoted coercive sterilization, and modern welfare policies that she argues continue to regulate and restrict Black motherhood. She contends that these policies reflect a broader framework of white supremacy that has historically viewed Black women's reproductive capabilities as a societal threat.

Dorothy says," I want this book to convince readers that reproduction is an important topic and that it is especially important to Black people." She uses this book to advocate for a more expansive understanding of reproductive freedom- one that includes not only the right to avoid childbirth but also the right to bear and raise children without interference.

This work also led Roberts to further examine the treatment of children of color within the U.S. child welfare system. After nearly two decades of research and advocacy with parents, social workers, family defense lawyers, and organizations, she argues that the system functions as a form of family policing, with unequal practices and outcomes that disproportionately affect Black families

=== Sex Power & Taboo: Gender and HIV in the Caribbean and Beyond ===
Roberts, with Rhoda Reddock, Sandra Reid, and Dianna Douglass, study the outbreak of HIV in the Caribbean in Sex, Power, And Taboo: Gender and HIV in the Caribbean and Beyond. The authors research how gender, norms, race, and power affect HIV treatment, polices, and stigma. The authors argue that to effectively end the HIV epidemic, it must be viewed through an intersectional lens.

The book discusses how sexuality in the Caribbean has traditionally been a taboo subject, often confined to cultural expressions such as music and theater. However, the HIV/AIDS crisis has brought these issues into public discourse, highlighting the need for a deeper understanding of the social and structural influences on sexual health. Sex, Power & Taboo takes an interdisciplinary approach, analyzing how gender ideologies and power dynamics influence sexual behavior and HIV risk. The contributors, both Caribbean and international scholars, provide insights relevant to academia, public health professionals, and policymakers.The research aims to inform research-based interventions for disease prevention and support the development of policies and programs addressing the epidemic shifting the paradigm of HIV and AIDS research to include gender as a central factor

=== Shattered Bonds: The Color of Child Welfare ===
Roberts outlines the role of race and class in the U.S. foster care system, focusing on how state intervention disproportionately persecutes and affects low-income Black families. Roberts details how thousands of children are removed from their homes each year, often due to conditions stemming from poverty rather than willful neglect or abuse. She highlights the challenges low-income families face in meeting state standards for regaining custody of their children and the broader implications of concentrated state supervision in predominantly Black communities.

Through interviews with Chicago mothers who had interacted with child protective services (CPS), Roberts illustrates how poverty-related circumstances are frequently classified as neglect, leading to state intervention. She discusses the racial disparities in CPS investigations, noting that Black and Indigenous families are disproportionately scrutinized and that children from these communities are more likely to be removed from their homes compared to White children. Roberts not only describes the racial differences in foster care, but she also highlights the discrimination that comes with high concentration of state intervention in predominantly Black neighborhoods, the struggle of low-wealth families in meeting state standards for regaining custody of their children, and the relationship between state supervision and systemic racial inequality.

=== Fatal Invention: How Science, Politics, and Big Business Re-create Race in the Twenty-first Century ===
Roberts explores the dangers of the continued research of race in the science and medical fields in her book Fatal Invention. She asserts that genomic science and biotechnology is reinforcing the concept of race as a biological category. She cautions that the continued research of race at a molecular level is used to hide racism in the United States and continues a racial division by justifying racial differences.

=== Torn Apart: How the Child Welfare System Destroys Black Families—and How Abolition Can Build a Safer World ===
Roberts examines the U.S. child welfare system and its impact on Black families. Roberts argues that the system disproportionately investigates and separates Black families, often in cases involving neglect rather than abuse. She contends that what is classified as neglect frequently stems from poverty-related conditions such as inadequate housing, food insecurity, and lack of childcare, rather than intentional harm. She critiques the system's reliance on punitive approaches and argues for alternative models that focus on economic and social support for families.

Citing data that "only 16 percent of children enter foster care due to physical or sexual abuse, she examines the role of economic hardship in family separations." The book discusses how a focus on neglect cases can strain resources, potentially limiting the ability of caseworkers to identify children facing serious harm. Roberts also explores the challenges faced by women in domestic-violence situations, noting that fears of child removal may deter them from seeking assistance.

== Awards and honors ==
- 1998 recipient of the Myers Center Award for the Study of Human Rights in North America
- 1999 Freedom of Choice Award, Chicago Abortion Fund
- 2005 Outstanding Achievement of Cultural Competency in Child Maltreatment, Prevention, and Intervention Award, American Professional Society on the Abuse of Children, for Shattered Bonds: The Color of Child Welfare
- 2010 Dorothy Ann and Clarence L. Ver Steeg Distinguished Research Fellowship
- 2011 Sage Award, Chicago Mayor Richard M. Daley and the Chicago Commission on Human Relations Advisory Council on Women
- 2014 James Brister Society Dr. Gloria Twine Chisum Award for Distinguished Faculty
- 2015 recipient of the Solomon Carter Fuller Award
- Northwestern University School of Law's Kirkland & Ellis Professor
- Faculty fellow at the Institute for Policy Research
- Fellow at Harvard University's Program in Ethics
- Fellow at Stanford's Center for Comparative Studies in Race and Ethnicity
- Chair of the board of directors of the Black Women's Health Imperative
- Member of the board of the National Coalition for Child Protection Reform
- 2022 elected member of the American Academy of Arts and Sciences
- 2023 "Sissy" Farenthold Lecture in Peace, Social Justice, and Human Rights, The Rothko Chapel & University of Texas at Austin
- 2024 MacArthur Fellow
