= Four Lights: An Adventure in Internationalism =

American women's suffrage periodical

Four Lights: An Adventure in Internationalism was a publication of the New York City Women's Peace Party (NYC-WPP) that ran bi-weekly for ten months in 1917, beginning on January 27, 1917. The editors argued against U.S. intervention in World War I from a socialist feminist perspective. The publication was one among many suffrage periodicals, and its editors considered themselves to be members of the anti-war movement described as "Internationalism." In November, 1917, publication ceased due to prosecution under the Espionage Act of 1917. The NYC-WPP, led by Crystal Eastman, was a branch of the national Women's Peace Party, though the NYC-WPP was often at odds with the state and national branches, particularly as those latter organizations increasingly supported U.S. intervention in Europe.

Earlier in the decade, suffragists were unified in their anti-war stance, but by 1917 most suffragists had shifted to supporting war and argued that women's war roles earned them the right to the franchise. Though not nearly as well known as other suffrage publications including The Woman Citizen and The Suffragist, Four Lights staked a more ardent position and stuck to its central tenets of pacifism throughout this year leading up to U.S. intervention in the Great War in Europe.

The magazine functioned on a unique editorial model, whereby each issue was edited by a different group of two or three women. Among the editors were:

- Jessie Ashley
- Mary Chamberlain
- Mary Ware Dennett
- Anna Herendeen
- Mary Ovington
