= National Birth Control League =

The National Birth Control League was a United States organization founded in the early 20th century to promote sex education, the use of means and methods to prevent conception, to lobby for a change in legislation making this illegal, and to bring up courtcases with the aim to change jurisprudence, enabling birth control.

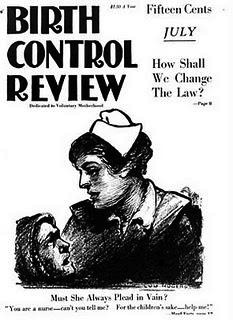
Birth Control Review cover, July 1919: "How shall we change the law?", "Must She Always Plead in Vain? "You are a nurse - can you tell me? For the children's sake - help me!"

It was founded in March 1915 by Mary Dennett, Jessie Ashley, Clara Gruening Stillman and Margaret Sanger, to improve birth control education and to change laws that prohibited access to information about how to prevent conception. It published birth control literature, drafted federal legislation concepts, and held conferences at its Fifth Avenue headquarters. Its activities were published in the Birth Control Review.

A committee was formed of 100 women to support the birth control activism work of Margaret Sanger. On the whole, though, the organization was subtler than Sanger in approach. It targeted much of its activities towards conservative and wealthy individuals. It eschewed membership of extremists, like Emma Goldman, and it particularly sought to spotlight the "scientific" aspects of birth control in an era when the topic sex education was considered obscene and the promotion of means to prevent conception illegal. Parents in 24 states were not allowed to discuss contraception with their married children.

In 1919, Mary Dennett pushed for a birth control bill in the New York legislature, which failed. As a result, the National Birth Control League was dismantled. Dennett immediately formed a new organization, the Voluntary Parenthood League, while Sanger was in Europe. Her sole purpose was to revise federal obscenity-focused legislation and jurisprudence to exclude birth control, rather than tackle the issue on a state-by-state basis.

The organization's successor was the American Birth Control League, founded by Margaret Sanger "to enlighten and educate all sections of the American public in the various aspects of the dangers of uncontrolled procreation and the imperative necessity of a world program of Birth Control." The organization had links to the eugenics -, immigration restriction - and social hygiene movements. The American Birth Control League later, in 1942, became Planned Parenthood.

== See also ==
- Birth control movement in the United States
