= Birth Control Review =

American magazine (1917–1940)

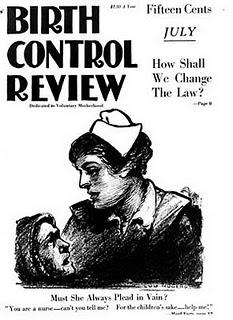
- Founder: Margaret Sanger
- Publisher: New York Woman's Publishing Company
- Editor-in-chief: Margaret Sanger
- Associate editor: Annie Porritt
- Founded: 1917
- Ceased publication: 1940

Birth Control Review, sometimes styled The Birth Control Review, was an American lay magazine established and edited by Margaret Sanger in 1917, three years after her friend, Otto Bobsein, coined the term "birth control" to describe voluntary motherhood or the ability of a woman to space children "in keeping with a family's financial and health resources." It continued publication until 1940.

== History ==
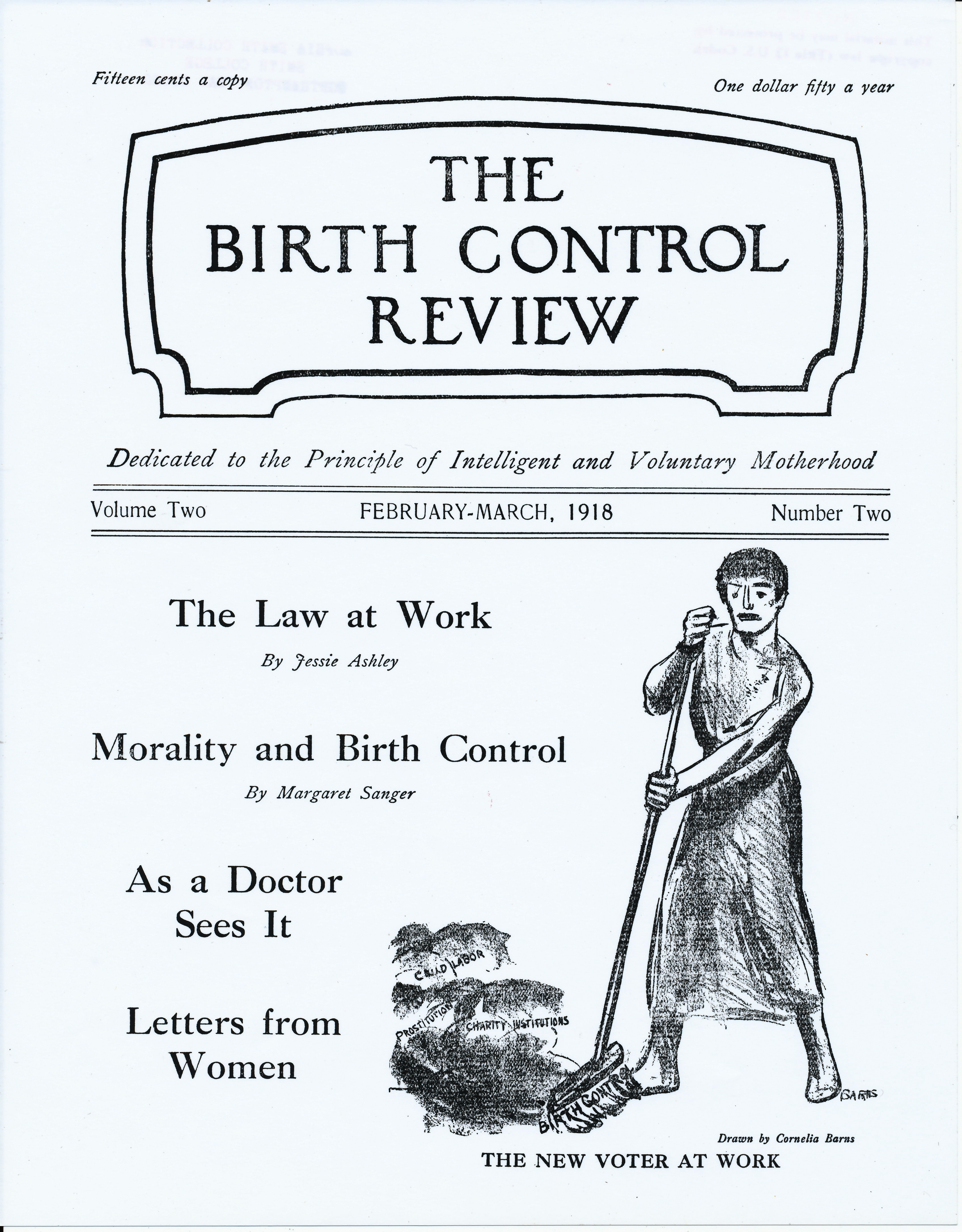
Cover of Birth Control Review February–March 1918 with cartoon image by Cornelia Barns, "The New Voter at Work".

The predecessor to the Birth Control Review was Sanger's previous publication titled "The Woman Rebel", a seven-issue periodical running March—October 1914. This journal was the first to publish the term "birth control" in print. This would subsequently lead to Sanger's use of the term to mobilize the Birth Control movement of the 20th century.

In October 1916, Sanger opened a family planning and birth control clinic in Brownsville, Brooklyn, New York. Sanger published the first issue while imprisoned with Ethel Byrne, her sister, and Fannie Mindell for giving contraceptives and instruction to poor women at the Brownsville Clinic in New York. The first edition of the journal came out officially in February 1917. Frederick A. Blossom distributed copies of this first issue as early as January 29, 1917 at a meeting at Carnegie Hall. The journal originally sold for fifteen cents a copy with a one dollar a year subscription. Original editors included Sanger and Blossom. Elizabeth Stuyvesant served as the secretary-treasurer.

During the first year of publication, the Review was funded through sales, subscriptions and donations. While Sanger was in prison, Blossom spent the money for the Review and then resigned. Issues continued in 1917 until June when there was a pause in publication due to lack of funds, though it was publicly attributed to the US entry into World War I. A December 1917 edition came out and one salesperson, Kitty Marion, helped sell over 1,000 copies in New York. Her sales helped keep the Review afloat. When Marion was selling copies of the magazine, she endured heckling, abuse, death threats and police obstruction.

Sanger worked with Jessie Ashley, Juliet Ruhblee and Helen M. Todd to create the New York Woman's Publishing Company which became the official publisher of the Review starting in May 1918. Mary Knoblauch was the managing editor.

After 1921, the American Birth Control League (ABCL) took over publication of the journal. Annie Porritt became an associate editor of the journal in 1922. Sanger remained editor-in-chief until January 31, 1929, when she turned it over to the ABCL.

Between 1933 and 1940, the Review became a shorter "monthly bulletin." The last issue was published in January 1940.

== Content ==
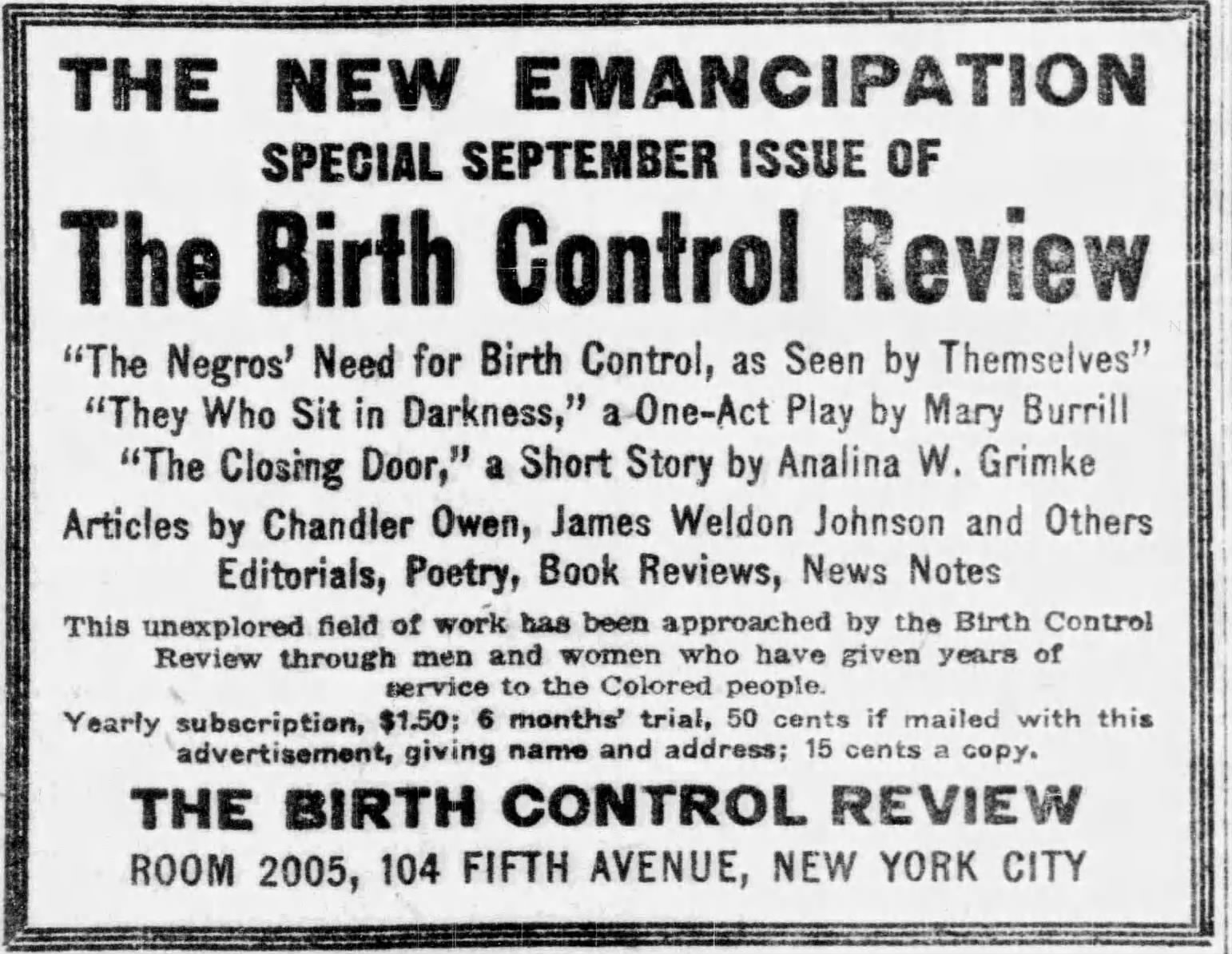
Birth Control Review Special Issue ad in The Chicago Defender, August 30, 1919.

The main goal of the Review was to increase public support for birth control by using both academic and popular arguments to build support for birth control practices both legally and socially. The BCR urged its readers join groups such as American Birth Control League (which spanned 10 different branches and later became Planned Parenthood). Content included news of birth control activities, articles by scholars, activists, and writers on birth control, and reviews of books and other publications. The Review also included art and fiction in the form of cartoons, poetry and short stories. The journal published statistics about the effectiveness of contraceptives. Information on diseases, especially sexually transmitted infections and tuberculosis, were published. It also included case studies and first hand accounts from women.

Some editions published a column called "Ten Good Reasons for Birth Control." Sanger herself contributed many editorials and articles for the journal. Her speeches were also published. Other contributors included Havelock Ellis, who wrote about psychology and sexual wellness. and Mary Dennett, who argued for birth control as a civil liberty. Eugenicists such as Roswell Johnson, David Starr Jordan, Sigard Adolphus Knopf, C. C. Little, Paul Popenoe, William J. Robinson and Lothrop Stoddard wrote for the magazine. Eugene V. Debs and Olive Schreiner both contributed to the Review.

Black authors also contributed to the Review. Special editions included information for and by Black people relating to family planning. Angelina Weld Grimké wrote two short stories for the Review. Other contributing writers included Midian Othello Bousfield, Elmer A. Carter, W. E. B. Du Bois, Isaac Fisher, Charles S. Johnson, Chandler Owen, and George Schuyler.

== Circulation ==
The Comstock Act of 1873 made mailing information about birth control and contraceptives, as well as any "article, instrument, substance, drug, medicine, or thing" intended for birth control or abortion, illegal. By 1919, most states also had laws that somehow condemned distributing or promoting contraceptives.

In the May 1918 issue, the editorial staff stated that the U.S. Postal Service had allowed the Review to have "second-class" mailing privileges. The journal was available in almost every state and circulation was at 10,000 copies an issue by 1922.
