= Lucia Ames Mead =

American pacifist, feminist, writer and educator

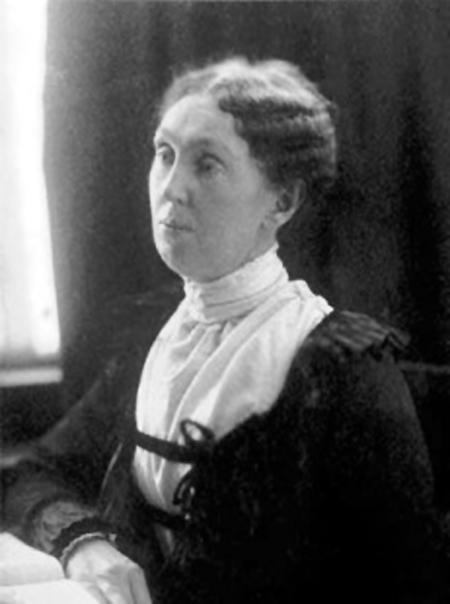
- Born: Lucia Jane Ames; May 5, 1856; Boscawen, New Hampshire
- Died: November 1, 1936 (aged 80); Brookline, Massachusetts
- Occupations: Educator, writer
- Spouse: Edwin Doak Mead (m. 1898)

Lucia Ames Mead (May 5, 1856 – November 1, 1936) was an American pacifist, feminist, writer, and educator based in Boston, Massachusetts.

== Early life ==
Lucia Jane Ames was born in Boscawen, New Hampshire, the daughter of Nathan Plummer Ames (1816-1880) and Elvira Coffin Ames (1819-1861). Her father was a Union Army veteran; her mother died when Lucia was a little girl. Her mother's brother, Charles Carleton Coffin, was a noted journalist who covered the American Civil War. After the war, Nathan Ames moved his family to Chicago; Lucia moved back to New England in 1870, after her stepmother died, to live with her older brother Charles and attend school. (She changed her own middle name from Jane to True.)

== Career ==
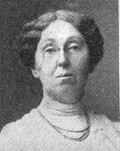
Lucia Ames Mead, 1921

Lucia Ames started her working life as a piano teacher in Boston. In 1897 she was a speaker at the Lake Mohonk Conference on International Arbitration, proclaiming her belief that "We are not first of all Americans, we are, first of all, human beings; we are, first of all, God's children, and we have identical interests with all God's children all over the face of the earth." In 1904 she created an exhibit for the American Peace Society at the St. Louis World's Fair, which was turned into a widely circulated pamphlet, "A Primer of the Peace Movement" (1905). She made an award-winning float called "Law Replaces War" for the Columbus Day parade in Boston in 1913. She worked for the establishment of a "Peace Day" holiday to be marked in schools on May 18, writing curriculum materials and giving conference talks on her ideas.

Lucia Ames Mead was national secretary of the Woman's Peace Party and a delegate at the founding of the Women's International League for Peace and Freedom in 1919, in Zurich. She was vice-president of the National Council for Prevention of War, and chaired the Peace and Arbitration program of the National Council of Women of the United States. She was a member of the National American Woman Suffrage Association and president of the Massachusetts Woman Suffrage Association. In 1912 she criticized English suffragettes' strategies as "vandalism" and counterproductive. In 1926 she was barred from speaking at Agnes Scott College because of her promotion of internationalism (which was labeled "bolshevism").

Books by Lucia Ames Mead include Great Thoughts for Little Thinkers (1888), Memoirs of a Millionaire (1889, a novel), To Whom Much is Given (1898), Milton's England (1903), Patriotism and the New Internationalism (1906), Patriotism and Peace: How to Teach them in Schools (1910), Swords and Ploughshares (1912), Economic Facts for Practical People (1914), What Young People Ought to Know about War and Peace (1916), and Law or War (1928). She also edited The Overthrow of the War System (1915), which contained essays by Jane Addams, Emily Greene Balch, Fannie Fern Andrews, and others.

== Personal life and legacy ==
Lucia Ames married Boston editor Edwin Doak Mead in 1898. She died in 1936, after injuries from a crushing crowd in the Boston subway. She was 80 years old. Her papers are archived in the Swarthmore College Peace Collection, with others at Harvard. A book-length biography of Mead was published in 1990.

Mead's niece Mary Dennett (her sister Livonia's daughter) became an outspoken feminist and family planning advocate.
