= Louis F. Post =

American government official and pamphleteer

Louis Freeland Post
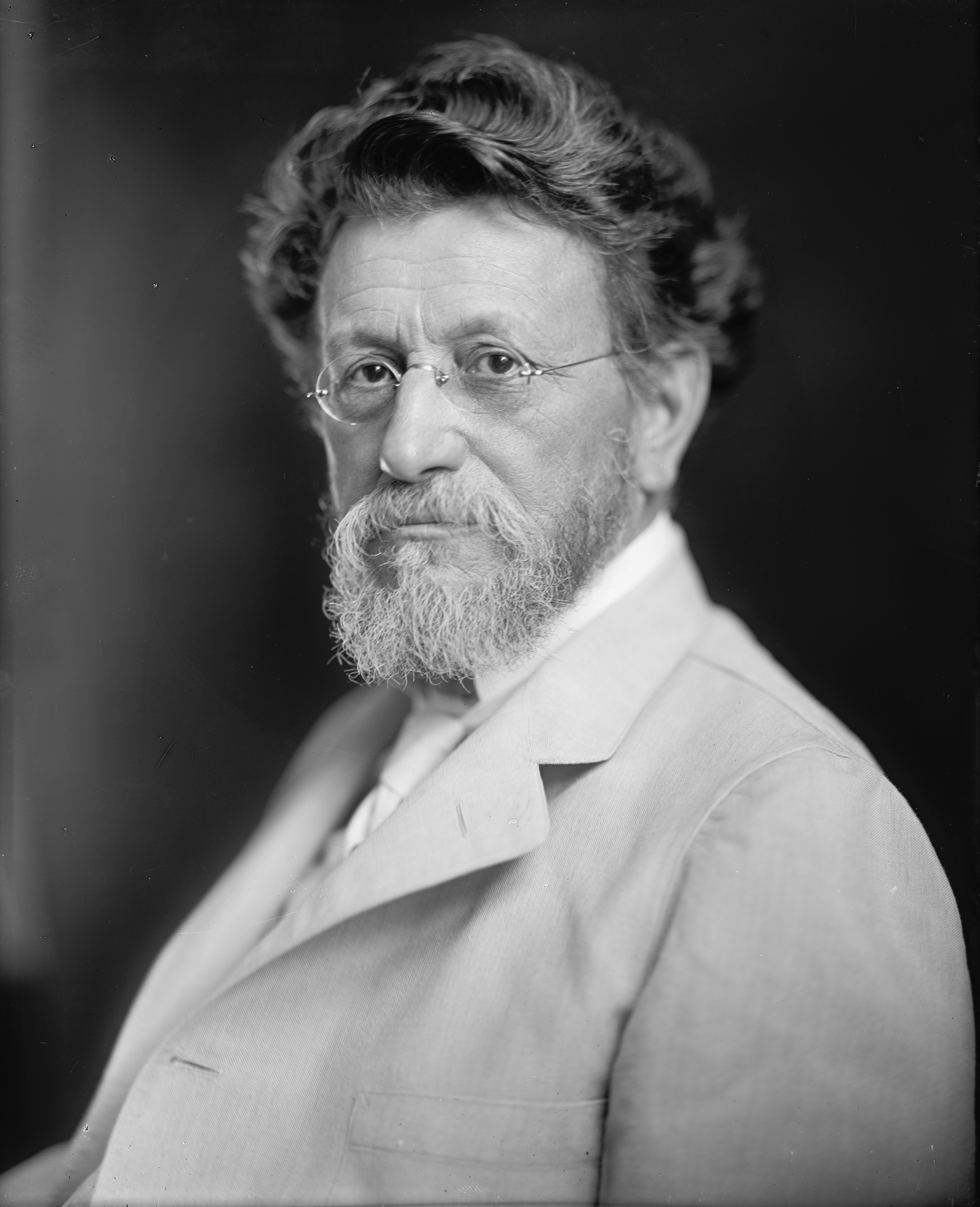
- Portrait by Harris & Ewing c. 1913–1921

United States Assistant Secretary of Labor
- In office March 5, 1913 – March 5, 1921
- President: Woodrow Wilson
- Preceded by: Office established
- Succeeded by: Edward J. Henning

Personal details
- Born: November 15, 1849 Hackettstown, New Jersey, U.S.
- Died: January 11, 1928 (aged 78) Washington, D.C., U.S.
- Party: Democratic
- Other political affiliations: Greenback (1884); United Labor (1886–1887)
- Spouse: Alice Thacher Post
- Parents: Eugene J. Post (father); Elizabeth Freeland (mother)
- Occupation: Lawyer, newspaper editor

Louis Freeland Post (November 15, 1849 – January 11, 1928) was a prominent American Georgist lawyer and newspaper editor who was appointed the first Assistant United States Secretary of Labor by President Woodrow Wilson, serving from 1913 to 1921. His tenure coincided with the period of the Palmer raids and the First Red Scare, where he had responsibility for the Bureau of Immigration. Post considered the raids to be unjust and he is credited with preventing many deportations and freeing many innocent people.

== Early life ==
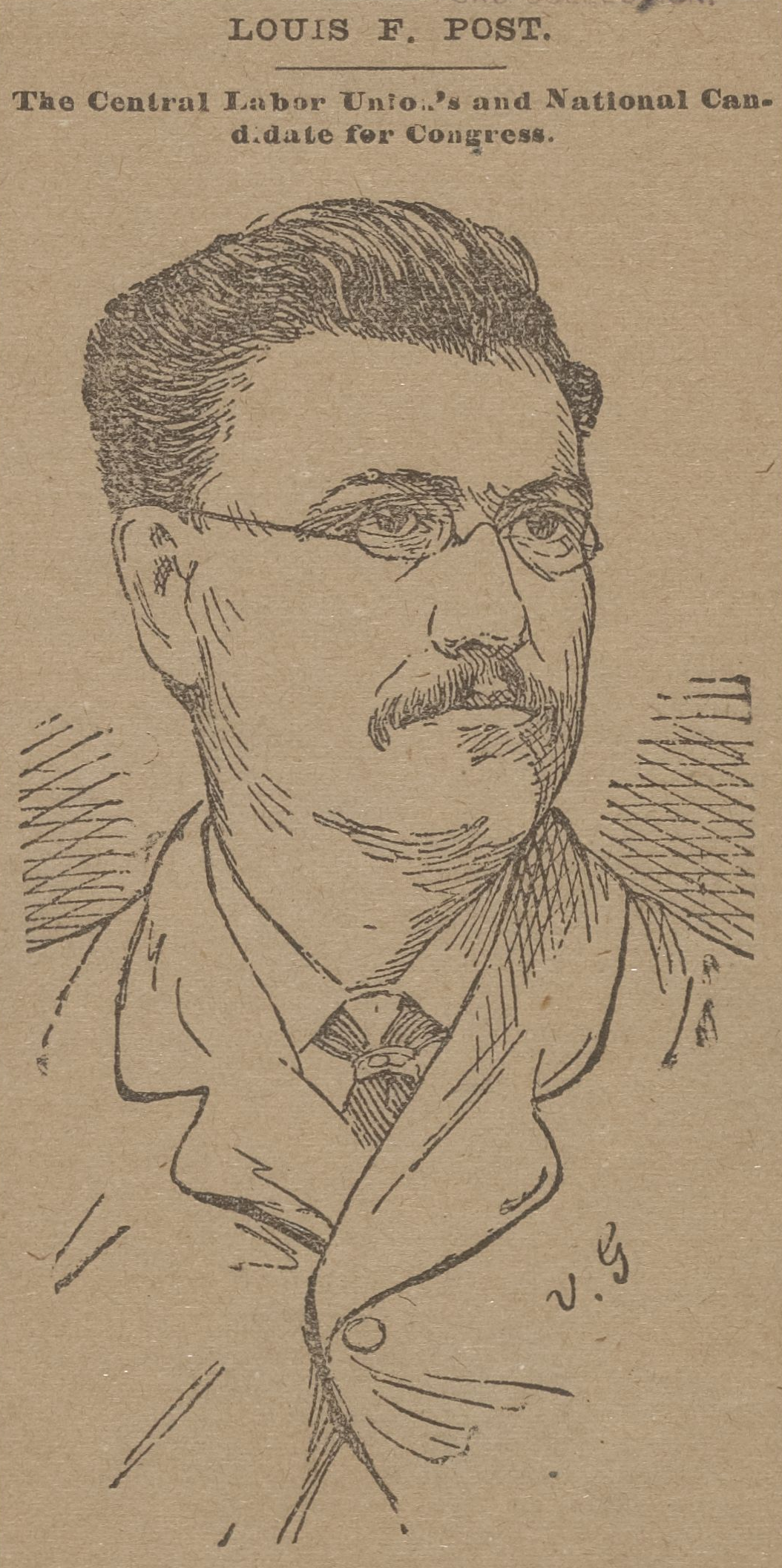
Post as a candidate for Congress, 1882

Post was born in Hackettstown, New Jersey. His father was a "New York merchant." His mother was a member of the prominent Freeland family. He quit school at fourteen, opting for four years in a newspaper office and then entered law school. By the age of 25, he had a lucrative law practice in New York City in an office on Broadway across from City Hall. He fell back into the newspaper business, becoming associate and then editor of the "New York Truth." From there he followed his interest in social reform and ran for Congress in 1882 with the backing of the Central Labor Union.

== Career ==
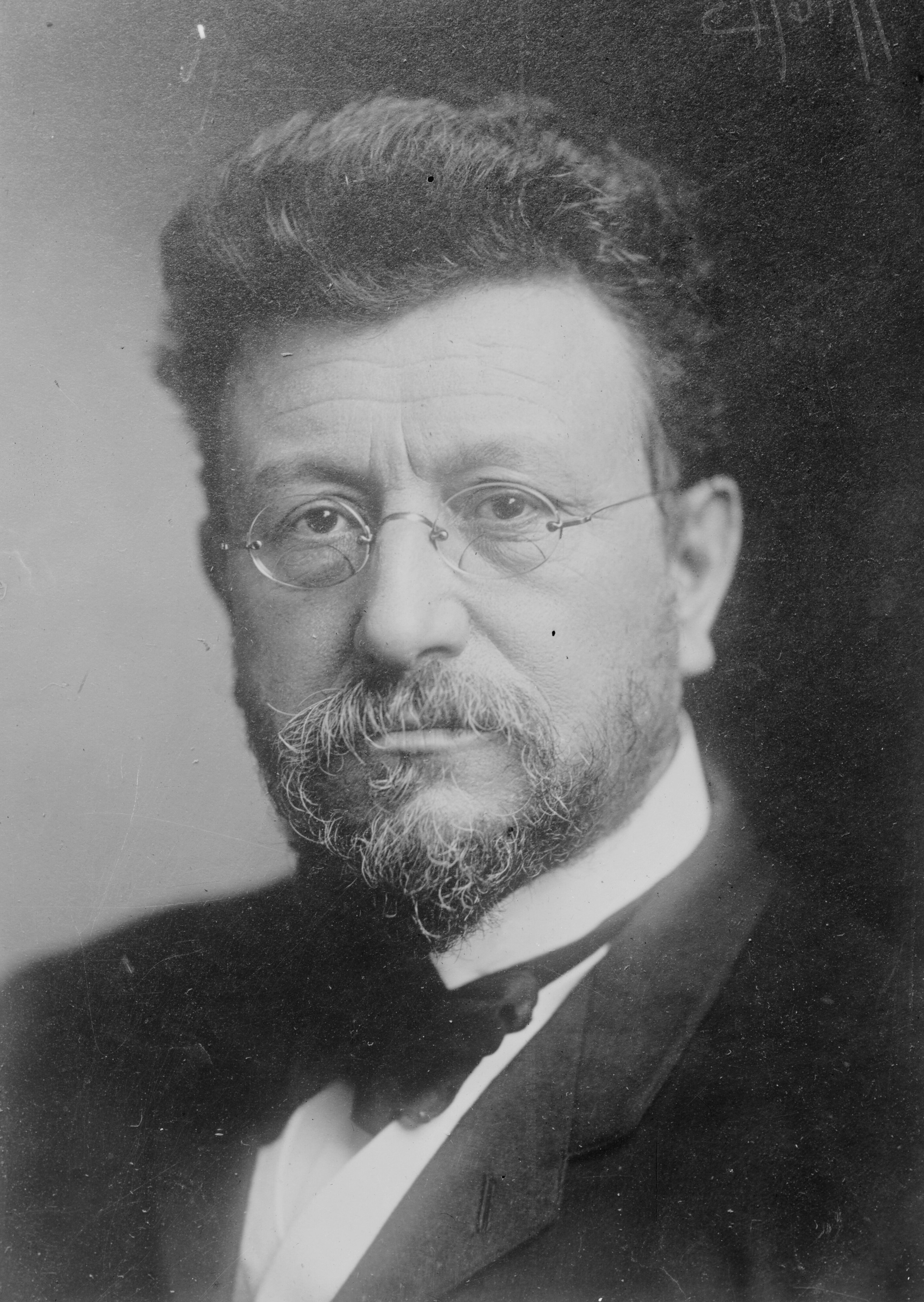
Post in 1913

Post opposed immigration restrictions and emphatically supported free speech and Henry George's single-tax movement. He once called George's political philosophy "my kind of radicalism...which regards the social values of natural resources as in their nature public property." He became chairman of George's United Labor Party in 1887, and was appointed Assistant Secretary of Labor by Woodrow Wilson in 1913, a position he held until the end of the Wilson administration in March, 1921.

Early in March 1920, the temporary absence of Secretary of Labor William B. Wilson and the recent resignation of the Department's Solicitor General made Post the Department's Acting Secretary and the key person responsible for the Bureau of Immigration for two critical months. He directed the review of all deportation cases and often opposed the activities of Attorney General A. Mitchell Palmer and J. Edgar Hoover, the head of the Justice Department's "Radical Division," soon renamed the General Intelligence Division. In 1919, in response to anarchist terror bombings, Hoover's agents penetrated many violent revolutionary groups and identified their members. In January 1920, Palmer and Hoover oversaw the Palmer raids designed to arrest those members who were not U.S. citizens and deport them.

The Anarchist Exclusion Act of 1918 set the standard for such deportations. It specified that "aliens who are members of or affiliated with any organization that entertains a belief in, teaches, or advocates the overthrow by force or violence of the Government of the United States or of all forms of law" were subject to deportation. Post, often with the support of Secretary Wilson, distinguished carefully among those arrested, for example, determining that membership in the Communist Labor Party was not grounds for deportation because it did not meet the legal standard that other organizations with similar names did meet, like the Communist Party of America. By April 10, Post had reviewed a backlog of 1600 cases and dismissed 71% of them. Some had been held for as long as two months for having attended a meeting of a radical group. Post also determined that aliens were entitled to a fair hearing, which was contrary to the position of the Bureau of Immigration, which held that immigrants were not subject to constitutional safeguards. Overall, Post is credited with preventing many deportations and freeing many innocent people. He also declined to take action against those he called "harmless but technically culpable." Some had in good faith resigned from a proscribed organization. Others only became "members" of such an organization when organizations merged, as often happened. On the other hand, he authorized the deportation of anarchists even "of the extreme pacifist type," because he thought the law required that.

As early as January 1920, the Federal Bureau of Investigation (FBI) began compiling a file on Post and his political leanings, but failed to find substantive evidence of radical connections on his part. Nevertheless, the House Committee on Immigration and Naturalization compiled a sensational report of Post's deportation decisions. When it leaked, the press made much of the affair, what Post later called "a newspaper cyclone of misrepresentation," though some coverage supported him. Some Congressmen traded speeches on his culpability, Committee Chairman Albert Johnson of Washington state attacking Post, and Congressman George Huddleston of Alabama defending him. On April 15, 1920, Kansas Congressman Homer Hoch accused Post of having abused his power and called for his impeachment. The House Committee on Rules planned to ask the President to remove Post instead of impeaching him, so Post requested and was granted a chance to testify. He successfully defended his actions on May 7–8, attacking Attorney General Palmer and others. In a dramatic exchange, Congressman Edward W. Pou, a Democratic supporter of the anti-radical campaign, praised Post's actions–"I believe you have followed your sense of duty absolutely"–and walked out of the room, leaving it in stunned silence. The Rules Committee took no further action.

After the Attorney General had spent 2 days reading a statement in his defense, the New York Evening Post gave Post the victory:

The simple truth is that Louis F. Post deserves the gratitude of every American for his courageous and determined stand in behalf of our fundamental rights. It is too bad that in making this stand he found himself at cross-purposes with the Attorney General, but Mr. Palmer's complaint lies against the Constitution and not against Mr. Post.

The American Legion later sought Post's dismissal in a letter to President Wilson on December 31, 1920. The White House responded with a letter quoting Labor Secretary Wilson who endorsed Post's actions, detailed the Constitutional principles that guided him, and praised his adherence to Department policies: "We will not deport anyone simply because he has been accused or because he is suspected of being a Red. We have no authority to do so under the law....Mr. Post...I am satisfied ranks among the ablest and best administrative officers in the Government service."

== Later life and death ==
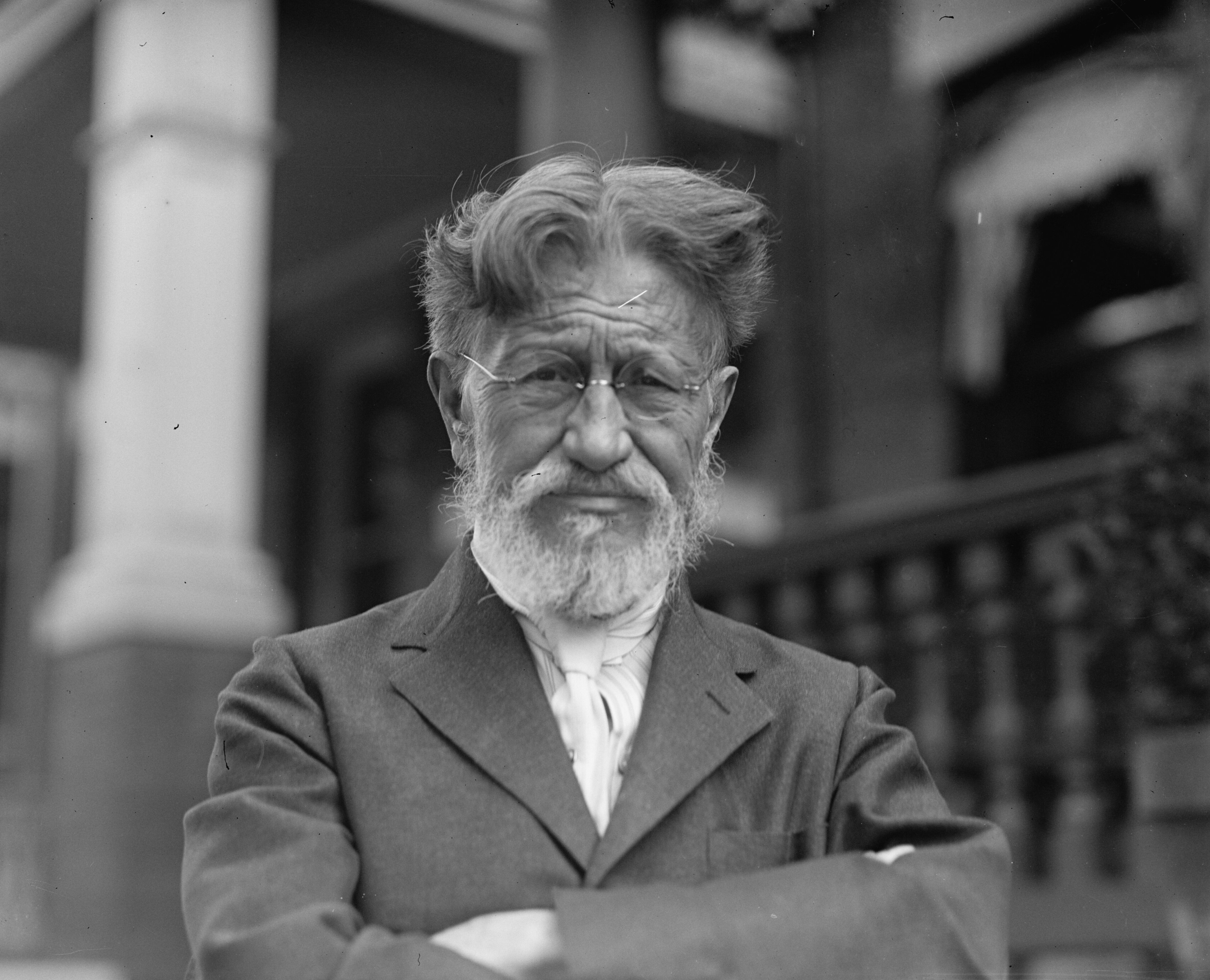
Post c. 1928

In retirement in 1923, he published The Deportations Delirium of Nineteen-Twenty: A Personal Narrative of an Historic Official Experience, a detailed account of the raids, arrests, and deportations of 1919–20. He called the entire effort "a stupendous and cruel fake". He asserted that his actions had been vindicated with the passage of time, that "no substantially erroneous decision of mine has yet been specified. Most certainly and without qualification may this be said of my cancellation decisions, and it was for these alone that my official fidelity was clamorously questioned.... Every attempt to show even one erroneous cancellation decision has utterly failed."

Post died on January 11, 1928, at Homeopathic Hospital in Washington, D.C., after a brief illness. The New York Times reported that he had been a lawyer and editor, noted his early advocacy of a single tax.

== Works ==
- An Account of the George-Hewitt Campaign in the New York Municipal Election of 1886. With Fred C Leubuscher. New York: John W. Lovell Company, 1887.
- Election Reform: Governor Hill's Reasons for Vetoing the Australian Ballot Bill... New York: n.p, 1888.
- Outlines of Louis F. Post's Lectures: On the Single Tax, Absolute Free Trade, the Labor Question, Progress and Poverty, the Land Question, the Elements of Political Economy, Socialism, Hard Times: With Illustrative Notes and Charts. New York: Sterling Library, 1894.
- A Business Tendency. Chicago: Public Publishing Co., n.d. [c. 1898].
- Department Stores. Chicago: Public Publishing Co., n.d. [c. 1898].
- The Taxation of Land Values. Chicago: Social Reform Union, 1900.
- The Single Tax: An Explanation, with Colored Charts and Illustrative Notes, of the Land, Labor, and Fiscal Reform Advocated. Cedar Rapids, IA: F. Vierth, 1900.
- The Chinese Exclusion Act. Chicago: Public Publishing Co., 1901.
- Landmarks of Liberty. Chicago: Public Publishing Co., n.d. [c. 1901].
- Success in Life. New York: Civic Publishing Co., 1902.
- Ethics of Democracy: A Series of Optimistic Essays on the Natural Laws of Human Society. New York: Moody Publishing Co., 1903.
- History of Municipal Affairs for the Past Two Years in Cleveland, O. Chicago: n.p., 1903.
- Look Ahead! Cedar Rapids, IA: F. Vierth, 1903.
- The Prophet Of San Francisco. Chicago : L.S. Dickey, 1904.
- How to Get Good Street Car Service in Chicago. Chicago: n.p., 1904.
- Our Advancing Postal Censorship. Chicago: Public Publishing Co., 1905.
- The Traction Issue in the Municipal Election in Chicago. Chicago: n.p., 1905.
- Could a Better System for Graft Be Devised? Chicago: Public Publishing Co., n.d. [c. 1905].
- Our Despotic Postal Censorship. Chicago: Public Publishing Co., 1906.
- Ethical Principles of Marriage and Divorce. Chicago: Public Publishing Co., 1906.
- The Relation of Working Men to Protection and Free Trade in the United States. London: T. Fisher Unwin, 1908.
- An Inquiry into the Institutional Causes of Crime. Cincinnati: Publicity Bureau, Joseph Fels Fund of America, n.d. [c, 1908].
- Raymond Robins: A Biographical Sketch: With Newspaper Accounts of and Comments on Mr. Robins' Work. Chicago : L.S. Dickey, n.d. [1909?].
- Assassination and Anarchism. Chicago: Public Publishing Co., n.d. [190-?].
- Origin and Progress of the Single Tax Movement. New York: Manhattan Single Tax Club, n.d. [190-?].
- Social Service. London: T. Fisher Unwin, 1910.
- A Single Tax View of Trusts. Cedar Rapids, IA: F. Vierth, n.d. [c. 1910].
- The Open Shop and the Closed Shop. Cincinnati: Publicity Bureau, Joseph Fels Fund of America, 1912.
- Outlines of Lectures on the Taxation of Land Values. Chicago: The Public, 1912.
- Taxation in Philadelphia. n.c.: n.p., 1913.
- Trusts, Good and Bad. Chicago, The Public, 1914.
- "Administrative Decisions in Connection with Immigration," American Political Science Review, vol. 10 no. 02 (May 1916), pp. 251–261.
- Financing the War. New York: Joseph Fels International Commission, 1917.
- Why We Are at War. New York: Joseph Fels International Commission, 1917.
- The Basic Facts of Economics: A Common-Sense Primer for Advanced Students. (2nd edition, 1918)
- Land Tenure in the Jewish Commonwealth. New York: Zionist Organization of America, 1919.
- "The Work of the Department of Labor of the United States during the War," Scientific Monthly, vol. 8 no. 4 (April 1919), pp. 331–335.
- The Deportations Delirium of Nineteen-Twenty: A Personal Narrative of an Historic Official Experience. Chicago: Charles H. Kerr & Co., 1923.
- A "Carpet Bagger" in South Carolina. Lancaster, PA: Association for the Study of Negro Life and History, 1925.
- What is the Single Tax? New York: Vanguard Press, 1926.
- Living a Long Life Over Again. n.c.: n.p., 1927.
- The Prophet of San Francisco: Personal Memories & Interpretations of Henry George. New York: Vanguard Press, 1930.
- A Non-Ecclesiastical Confession of Religious Faith: An Address. New York: Swedenborg Foundation, 1967.
