= American Birth Control League =

American birth-control organization (1921–42); predecessor of Planned Parenthood

The American Birth Control League (ABCL) was founded by Margaret Sanger in 1921 at the First American Birth Control Conference in New York City. The organization promoted the founding of birth control clinics and encouraged women to control their own fertility. In 1942, the league became the Planned Parenthood Federation of America.

== History ==
The League was founded by Margaret Sanger in 1921, and incorporated under the laws of New York State on April 5, 1922. Frances B. Ackerman served as the first Treasurer. Anne Kennedy was the Executive Treasurer. Lothrop Stoddard and C. C. Little were among the founding directors. Birth Control Leagues had already been formed in a number of larger American cities between 1916 and 1919 due to Sanger's lecture tours and the publication of the Birth Control Review. By 1924, the American Birth Control League had 27,500 members, with ten branches maintained in Pennsylvania, Ohio, Indiana, Michigan, Massachusetts, Connecticut, Colorado, and the Canadian province of British Columbia.

In June 1928, Margaret Sanger resigned as president of the American Birth Control League, founding the National Committee on Federal Legislation for Birth Control and splitting the Birth Control Clinical Research Bureau from the League. Following this, the presidents of the ABCL were Eleanor Dwight Robertson Jones (1928–1934), Catherine Clement Bangs (1934–1936) and C. C. Little (1936–1939), and one of its vice presidents was Juliet Barrett Rublee. In 1939 the two were reconciled and merged to form the Birth Control Federation of America. In 1942 the name was changed to Planned Parenthood Federation of America.

Its headquarters were located at 104 Fifth Avenue, New York City from 1921–1930 and at various offices on Madison Avenue from 1931–1939. It was not associated with the National Birth Control League, founded in 1915 by Mary Coffin Ware Dennett, or the later Voluntary Parenthood League.

== Goals and activities ==
The ABCL was founded on the following principles, here excerpted from Margaret Sanger's The Pivot of Civilization:

We hold that children should be

1. Conceived in love;
2. Born of the mother's conscious desire;
3. And only begotten under conditions which render possible the heritage of health.

Therefore we hold that every woman must possess the power and freedom to prevent conception except when these conditions can be satisfied.

At its founding, the ABCL announced the following purposes:

- To enlighten and educate all sections of the American public in the various aspects of the dangers of uncontrolled procreation and the imperative necessity of a world programme of birth control.
- To correlate the findings of scientists, statisticians, investigators, and social agencies in all fields.
- To organize and conduct clinics where the medical profession may give to mothers and potential mothers harmless, reliable methods of birth control.
- To enlist the support and cooperation of legal advisors, statesmen, and legislators in effecting the removal of State and Federal statutes which encourage dysgenic breeding.

Margaret Sanger listed the following aims of the organization in the appendix of her book The Pivot of Civilization:

- Research: To collect the findings of scientists, concerning the relation of reckless breeding to the evils of delinquency, defect and dependence;
- Investigation: To derive from these scientifically ascertained facts and figures, conclusions which may aid all public health and social agencies in the study of problems of maternal and infant mortality, child-labor, mental and physical defects and delinquence in relation to the practice of reckless parentage.
- Hygienic and Physiological: instruction by the Medical profession to mothers and potential mothers in harmless and reliable methods of Birth Control in answer to their requests for such knowledge.
- Sterilization: of the insane and feebleminded and the encouragement of this operation upon those afflicted with inherited or transmissible diseases, with the understanding that sterilization does not deprive the individual of his or her sex expression, but merely renders him incapable of producing children.
- Education: The program of education includes: The enlightenment of the public at large, mainly through the education of leaders of thought and opinion--teachers, ministers, editors and writers to the moral and scientific soundness of the principles of Birth Control and the imperative necessity of its adoption as the basis of national and racial progress.
- Political and Legislative: To enlist the support and cooperation of legal advisers, statesmen and legislators in effecting the removal of state and federal statutes which encourage dysgenic breeding, increase the sum total of disease, misery and poverty and prevent the establishment of a policy of national health and strength.
- Organization: To send into the various States of the Union field workers to enlist the support and arouse the interest of the masses, to the importance of Birth Control so that laws may be changed and the establishment of clinics made possible in every State.
- International: This department aims to cooperate with similar organizations in other countries to study Birth Control in its relations to the world population problem, food supplies, national and racial conflicts, and to urge all international bodies organized to promote world peace, the consideration of these aspects of international amity.

In 1921, the ABCL organized the First American Birth Control Conference at New York City, November 11–18, 1921. Subsequent conferences were held over the next two years in Philadelphia, Cincinnati, Albany, and Chicago. The ABCL arranged the holding of the Sixth International Birth Control Congress in the United States in 1925. The ABCL published leaflets, pamphlets, books, and a monthly missal named Birth Control Review. Margaret Sanger served as the first president of the organization.

== See also ==
- Birth control movement in the United States
