= Opportunity: A Journal of Negro Life =

US periodical

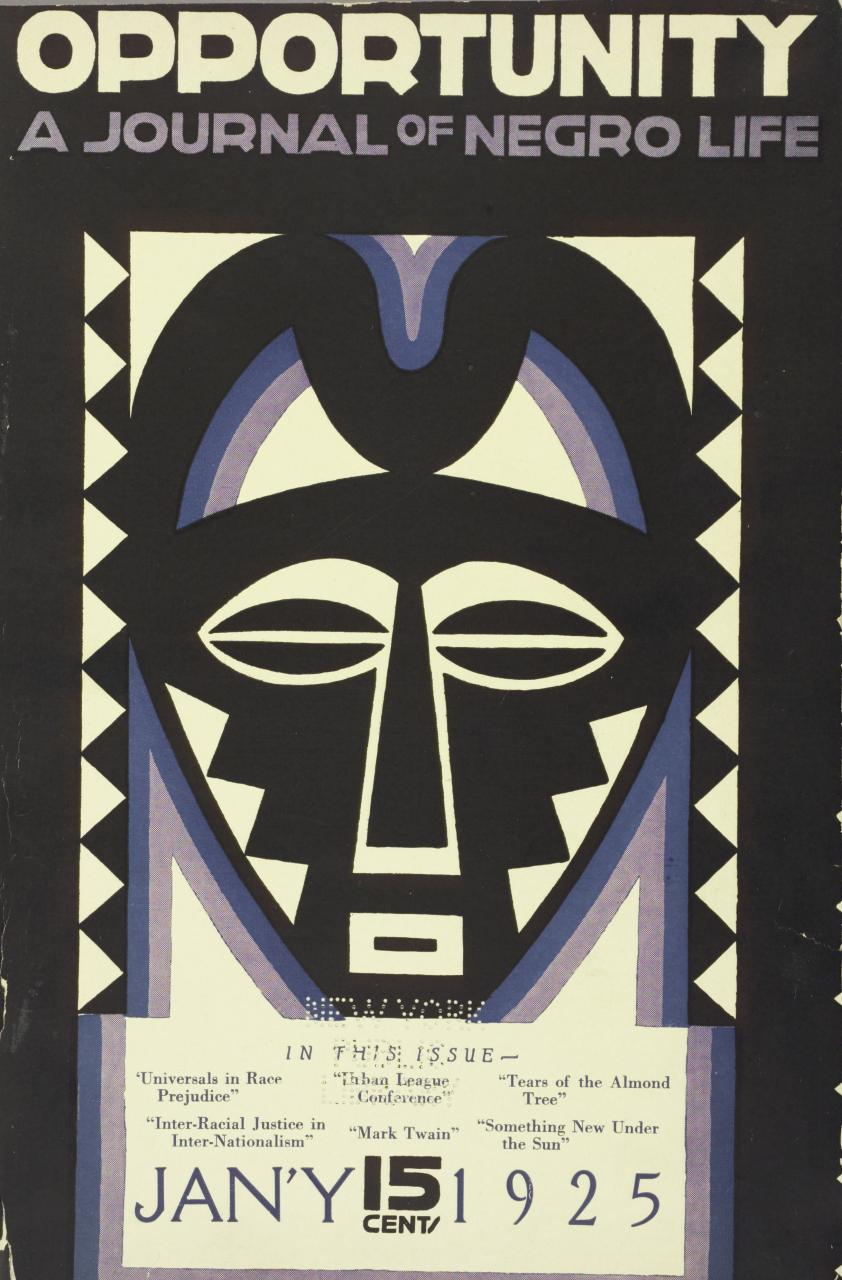
- Opportunity: A Journal of Negro Life Volume 3, cover dated January 1925
- Categories: Culture, Sociology
- Frequency: Monthly
- Publisher: National Urban League
- Founded: 1923
- Final issue: 1949; 77 years ago
- Country: United States
- Language: English

Opportunity: A Journal of Negro Life was an academic and literary journal published by the National Urban League (NUL). The journal acted as a sociological forum for the emerging topic of African-American studies and was known for fostering the literary culture during the Harlem Renaissance. It was published monthly from 1923 to 1942, and then quarterly through 1949.

== History ==
Opportunity was the official journal of the National Urban League (NUL) and first published in 1923. It served as a major social and literary hub for writers and thinkers involved in the Harlem Renaissance. The name of the journal came from the NUL slogan, "Not alms, but opportunity."

First editor-in-chief, Charles S. Johnson, wrote in the first issue of Opportunity, "Accurate and dependable facts can correct inaccurate and slanderous assertions that have gone unchallenged… and what is most important, to inculcate a disposition to see enough of interest and beauty of their own lives to rid themselves of the inferior feeling of being Negro." Johnson tasked his secretary, Ethel Nance, to identify creative talent among Black people and to encourage them to submit to the journal.

Ruth Standish Baldwin, the white widow of a railroad magnate, and George Edmund Haynes were two patrons that helped fund the creation of the journal. Haynes, a graduate of Fisk University, Yale University, and Columbia University, became the NUL's first executive secretary. The interracial character of the League's board was set from its first days; it was the template for Charles Johnson's approach to fostering interest, support, and occasion for African-American art and artists. Critics of the journal, as well as of the Harlem Renaissance, thought that Johnson's literary content may have been pandering to his white audience and patrons. Wallace Thurman said, "The results of the Renaissance have been sad rather than satisfactory, in that critical standards have been ignored and the measure of achievement has been racial rather than literary"

Countee Cullen became an assistant editor of Opportunity in 1926.

Under Johnson's editorship the journal's circulation rose to 11,000 in 1928. Johnson stepped down as chief editor of Opportunity but continued to contribute to the journal through 1931.

Elmer A. Carter took over as chief editor from 1928 to 1942. Under his leadership, the journal remained an important literary and research outlet for Black Americans. Carter hired Dutton Ferguson as an editor of the journal in 1942 and he started there on September 1. Madeline L. Aldridge took over as "acting editor" after Carter left, starting in January 1943.

In 1943, the journal went to a quarterly publication schedule due to rationing on paper and printing. During her tenure as editor, Aldridge created a special issue focused on Black women and their work towards the war effort.

Ferguson was the chief editor from 1947 to 1949. Under his leadership, the magazine had a new look and new features. Ferguson increased the amount of images printed in the journal and expanded news from Urban League organizations throughout the country.

The leadership of the National board of the Urban League chose to end publication of the journal in 1949 due to rising publication costs.

== Content ==
The studies published in the early issues of Opportunity were conducted and funded by the NUL and supported the social mission of an academic journal connected with the missions of the NUL and Fisk University. Topics centered on the social challenges faced by Black people at the time, including access to employment, housing, sanitation and education.

"Opportunity is a venture inspired by a long insistent demand, both general and specific, for a journal of Negro life that would devote itself religiously to an interpretation of the social problems of the Negro population.... The policy of Opportunity will be definitely constructive. It will aim to present, objectively, facts of Negro life. It hopes, thru an analysis of these social questions, to provide a basis of understanding; encourage interracial co-operation in the working out of these problems."

Johnson believed that misunderstanding led to racial discrimination and that highlighting Black achievement and art would help bridge this gap. Starting in 1925, Opportunity began to publish short fiction.

Writers such as Gwendolyn B. Bennett and Countee Cullen had regular columns in the journal. Bennett's column was called "The Ebony Flute" and Cullen's was named "The Dark Tower." Johnson also regularly continued to write editorial columns and use facts to counter racial prejudice. A column appearing in 1947 called "On Stage" related Black talent in theater, radio and television, was edited by George Norford.

=== Literary contests ===
Johnson is credited for organizing and promoting literary parties, which successfully brought together African-American artists and white patrons of money and letters. It also exposed Black talent to major publishing houses. Starting in 1924, Johnson sponsored literary contests in order to showcase the creative talent of Black people. The first of contest received 732 entries. After the first dinner presenting the award winners, Paul U. Kellogg later featured the artists from this first contest in Survey Graphic.

The May 1925 issue of Opportunity lists a number of prizewinners who went on to enjoy successful publishing careers including Sterling Brown, Cullen, E. Franklin Frazier, Langston Hughes, Zora Neale Hurston. In 1927, the contest featured Arna Bontemps, Jonathan H. Brooks, Sterling Allen Brown, Hughes, and Helene Johnson. Prize money for the contests came from Casper Holstein.

=== Illustrations and art ===
Opportunity often featured images of contemporary Black art and ancient African artifacts. Aaron Douglas was one of the journal's illustrators, often using African art as a point of inspiration. Other artists included Bennett, Richard Bruce Nugent, and Winold Reiss.
