= Madeleine Zabriskie Doty =

American journalist and prisoner's rights advocate

Madeleine Zabriskie Doty, JD, PhD (August 24, 1877 – October 14, 1963) was an American journalist, pacifist, civil libertarian, and advocate for the rights of prisoners, as well as the International Secretary for the Women's International League for Peace and Freedom.

== Early life and education ==
Madeleine Zabriskie Doty was born in Bayonne, New Jersey, August 24, 1877, to Samuel and Charlotte Zabriskie Doty. She received a B.L. from Smith College in 1900, an L.L.B. from New York University in 1902, and a Ph.D. in International Relations from the Graduate Institute of International Studies in Geneva in 1945. While at NYU she became a charter member of the Nu chapter of Alpha Omicron Pi.

== Career ==
=== Advocacy for prisoners ===
After practicing law for five years in New York City, her interest turned to children's courts and delinquency and for three years she was secretary of the Russell Sage Foundation Children's Court Committee. As a member of New York's Prison Reform Commission in 1913, she voluntarily spent a week in prison to investigate conditions, adopting Maggie Martin as her alias. She described inhumane conditions in women's prisons, and advocated dramatic changes relating to prison management, prisoner autonomy, and prison activities. In addition to recommending improvements in food and sanitation, she advocated for the prisoners having a say in the way that the prisons were run. To that end, she proposed a system of prisoner self-government.

Out of this experience she published Society's Misfits (1916) about juvenile and women's prison reform. After the publication of this text, New York State prison administrators experimented with some of her recommendations.

=== Journalism ===
Doty's pacifist principles placed her among an international circle of pacifist women who believed that women's exclusion from war-making councils gave them an objective view which made them more natural peacemakers than men. In 1915, with Jane Addams and forty-three other women from the U.S., she attended the Women's Peace Congress, also called Women at the Hague, in the Netherlands. On this journey, she represented the Women's Lawyers Association and worked as a reporter for Century Magazine and a special correspondent for the New York The Evening Post.

She then became a correspondent for the New York Tribune and Good Housekeeping. She reported from Hamburg, Germany for the Tribune in 1916, and reported that it was "like a dying city" as the citizens were starving. For Good Housekeeping, she traveled around the world and was in Russia during the 1917–1918 revolution. She published Short Rations: An American Woman In Germany in 1917 and Behind The Battle Line in 1918.

=== Pacifism ===
On her return to the U.S. in 1917, Doty became an editor with her friend Crystal Eastman of Four Lights, the radical paper of the New York Woman's Peace Party. In a letter on January 13, 1917, to Dr. Maria Montessori, Fannie May Witherspoon, a Christian socialist and another co-editor of Four Lights, described the purpose of the paper as "striking what seems to us a much-needed note of internationalism in these days of universal warfare and national strife ... the contributors will be chiefly women, and the issues of feminism and peace will naturally go hand in hand." Reporting war news from a feminist and pacifist lens, it published articles featuring a "gender-based critique of American society and democracy."

Doty continued to play a part in the peace movement first as International Secretary for the WILPF in Geneva, where she moved in 1925, then as editor of Pax International for the League of Nations.

=== Teaching and higher education administration ===
In 1936, foreseeing the collapse of the League, Doty decided that the only way to secure world peace was through education of the young. She created and organized the first Geneva Junior Year Abroad program for the University of Delaware, 1938–1939. Because it was impossible to continue during World War II, she studied at the Graduate Institute of International Studies in Geneva, receiving a Ph.D. in International Relations in 1945 at the age of 66. After the war she returned to the U.S. and between 1946 and 1949 she organized and ran another Geneva Junior Year Abroad program for Smith College.

Beginning in 1950 Doty taught history at Miss Harris's School in Florida. She retired at the age of 75. She returned to Geneva and lectured on American history at the University of Geneva until 1962.

== Personal life ==
In 1919 she married pacifist Roger Baldwin, who later founded the ACLU. Doty had been Crystal Eastman's roommate, which is how she met Baldwin. Doty and Baldwin literally vowed to maintain a "free marriage", with neither requiring monogamy of the other. Doty retained her maiden name, had an active public career, supported herself financially, and employed a domestic servant to manage the reproduction of the household. However, they were divorced in 1925.

The Madeleine Zabriskie Doty papers are held in the Sophia Smith Collection at Smith College: "The collection was a bequest of Doty and her executor, Katherine S. Strong, in 1964 and 1989."

In 1962, she moved to Greenfield, Massachusetts, where she died on October 14, 1963.

== Writings ==
- Doty, Madeleine Zabriskie (1917). Short Rations: An American Woman in Germany, 1915... 1916. Century Company. hdl:2027/hvd.32044087512182.
- Doty, Madeleine Zabriskie (1918). Behind the Battle Line: Around the World in 1918. Macmillan. hdl:2027/loc.ark:/13960/t5q81t778.
- Doty, Madeleine Zabriskie (1911). "Treatment of Minor Cases of Juvenile Delinquency". Proceedings of the Academy of Political Science in the City of New York. 1 (4): 694–704. doi:10.2307/1172079. JSTOR 1172079.
- Doty, Madeleine Zabriskie (1945). The central organisation for a durable peace (1915-1919). Its history, work and ideas. (Ambilly: Franco Suisse.) 180 p.
- Doty, Madeleine Zabriskie (1916). Society's Misfits. Century. hdl:2027/mdp.39015028064775.
- Doty, Madeleine Z; Rinehart, Alice Duffy (2001). One woman determined to make a difference: the life of Madeleine Zabriskie Doty. Bethlehem [PA]; London; Cranbury, NJ: Lehigh University Press; Associated University Presses. ISBN 9780934223676.
