= Alice Thacher Post =

American editor

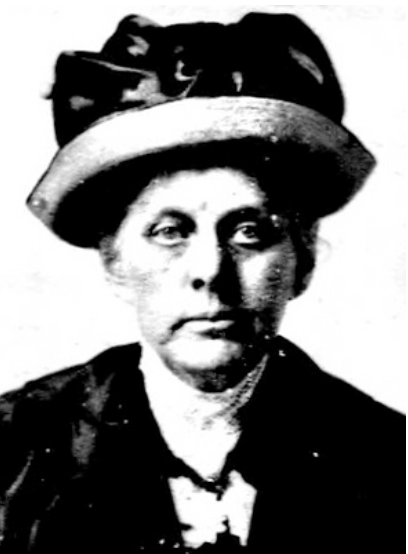
- Alice Thacher Post, from her 1915 passport application
- Born: June 8, 1853; Boston, Massachusetts
- Died: February 2, 1947 (aged 93); Washington, D.C.
- Occupations: Editor, suffragist, pacifist
- Spouse: Louis Freeland Post
- Relatives: Noah Worcester (great-grandfather)

Alice Thacher Post (June 8, 1853 – February 2, 1947) was an American editor, suffragist, and pacifist. She was a founding officer of the Woman's Peace Party. She was married to Louis F. Post, who was Assistant Secretary of Labor in the Wilson administration.

== Early life ==
Alice Thacher was born in Boston, the daughter of Thomas Thacher and Catherine Worcester Thacher. Her grandfather, Thomas Worcester, was the first Massachusetts clergyman ordained in the Swedenborgian "New Church" tradition. Her great-grandfather was also a noted clergyman and pacifist, Noah Worcester.

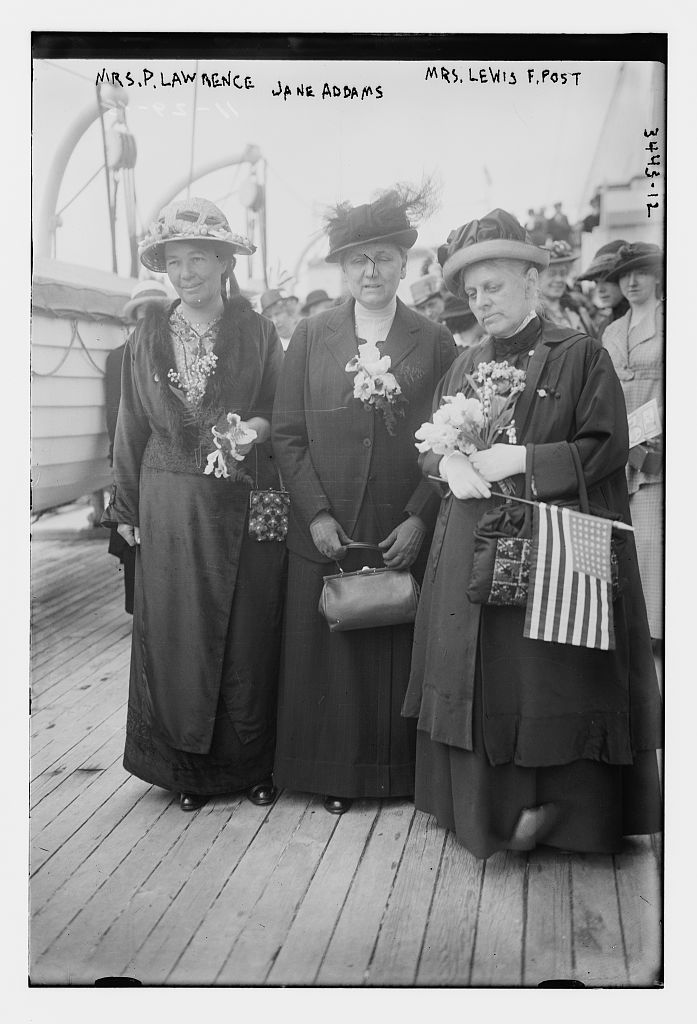
Emmeline Pethick-Lawrence, Jane Addams, and Alice Thacher Post in 1915, from the Library of Congress

== Career ==
Thacher worked as an editor at The New Church Messenger, a Swedenborgian publication based in New Jersey, and The New Earth, before her marriage in 1893. Working with her husband, she was managing editor of The Public, a political weekly based in Chicago and in New York, from 1893 to 1913. She also wrote and published poetry and articles in other magazines.

Post moved to Washington, D.C., when her husband became Assistant Secretary of Labor in 1913. She was a founding member of the Woman's Peace Party, vice-president of the American Proportional Representation League, and a member of the American Anti-Imperialist League, among other suffrage, peace, social justice organizations. She addressed a meeting of the Women's Single Tax League of Washington in 1913, proposing that suffrage laws should consider the rights of children to representation at the ballot. She was an American delegate to the International Congress of Women in 1915 when it was held at the Hague, and in 1919 when it was held in Zürich; she also attended the 1924 meeting of the Women's International League for Peace and Freedom (WILPF) in Washington, D.C.

== Personal life and legacy ==
Alice Thacher married widower Louis F. Post in 1893. He died in 1928, and she died in 1947, at her home in Washington, D.C., at the age of 93. Anna George de Mille wrote a tribute to the Posts, as "Partners in the truest sense, these two great people lived gently and bravely, asked little and gave much. They blazed a trail of spiritual dedication to human betterment for all of us to follow." Her papers are in the Louis F. Post Papers, Library of Congress. Her correspondence is also a significant part of the WILPF records at the University of Colorado.
