= Elmer A. Carter =

Elmer Anderson Carter (July 19, 1890 - January 16, 1973) was an American writer and civil rights activist. He was involved with the National Urban League and was an editor of Opportunity: A Journal of Negro Life.

== Biography ==
Carter was born in Rochester, New York on July 19, 1890. His father, George C. Carter, was a Methodist minister and his mother, Florence Carter, "was a companion and friend to Harriet Tubman." As a boy, he met Tubman and was proud of that fact throughout his life. In 1899, the family moved to Gloversville, New York where his father became the pastor of the local African Methodist Episcopal Zion Church. Elmer Carter graduated from Gloversville High School in 1907 and he went on to Harvard University, graduating in 1912. In school, he was well-known as an orator. He was a member of the Alpha Phi Alpha fraternity. After graduating from Harvard, he taught history at Prairie View State Normal College.

During World War I, Carter served with the 92nd Division overseas where he fought in the Meuse–Argonne offensive. After the war, he started working as a secretary for the National Urban League at the Columbus, Ohio office. He worked for the league in Louisville, Kentucky and Minneapolis–Saint Paul. For the St. Paul Urban League, Carter had a role in creating the Hallie Q. Brown Community Center. As a member of the League, Carter spoke in favor of anti-lynching legislation in 1934.

Carter became the editor of Opportunity: A Journal of Negro Life in 1928 and continued in that capacity until 1942. He wrote for other magazines and journals including, the Birth Control Review, Labor Age,The Messenger, and Survey Graphic. During World War II, Carter wrote about discrimination in the US Military and called for Black combat troops to serve with Chinese soldiers who had "no color line."

Governor Herbert H. Lehman appointed Carter to the Unemployment Insurance Appeal Board in 1937. In 1945, Carter was appointed the New York State Commission Against Discrimination, which later became the New York State Division of Human Rights. In 1953, he became the first Black man to run as a Republican candidate for president of the Manhattan Borough. Carter resigned from the New York State Human Rights Division in 1961. He continued to work in politics, advising Governor Nelson Rockefeller on "race relations."

== Personal life and legacy ==
Carter married Thelma Charles Johnson on June 7, 1927.

Carter died on January 16, 1973 in a nursing home only two weeks after the death of his wife. He was buried in Ferncliff Cemetery. Carter's portrait is part of the collection of the Smithsonian's National Portrait Gallery.
