= Eleanor Dwight Robertson Jones =

American activist (1880–1965)

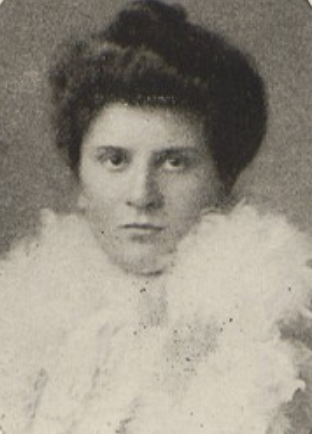
- Eleanor Dwight Cook, from the 1902 yearbook of Radcliffe College
- Born: Eleanor Dwight Cook; November 14, 1880; Cambridge, Massachusetts
- Died: July 29, 1965 (aged 84); Riverhead, New York
- Other names: Mrs. F. Robertson Jones
- Occupations: Suffragist, writer, activist
- Known for: President, American Birth Control League (1928–1935)

Eleanor Dwight Cook Robertson Jones (November 14, 1880 – July 29, 1965), known professionally as Mrs. F. Robertson Jones, was an American suffragist, feminist, and writer. She was president of the American Birth Control League from 1928 to 1935.

== Early life ==
Eleanor Dwight Cook was born in Cambridge, Massachusetts, the daughter of William Cook and Susan Coffin Boyd Cook. Her father was a professor of German at Harvard. She graduated from Radcliffe College in 1902.

== Career ==
Cook taught English at Bryn Mawr College from 1903 to 1906, and taught at the Chapin School from 1906 to 1908. She became active in suffrage work, as a member of the Woman's Political Union of New York City; she worked on publicity and outreach projects for the suffrage organization in the 1910s, including parades and outdoor speeches. She was also active with the Woman's Municipal League of New York.

After suffrage was won, Robertson Jones was active in the American Birth Control League. She served on the league's board of directors, and was acting president while Margaret Sanger attended the 1926 World Population Conference in Geneva. She spoke to community organizations, participated in public debates and national conferences, and lobbied in the New York legislature. She was president of the league in 1928 to 1935.

Robertson Jones supported eugenic policies, including "helping the right sorts of persons to have more children" and sterilization to prevent "defective lineage". In her later years, she worked for the legalization of euthanasia, as executive vice-president of the Euthanasia Society of America.

== Personal life ==
Eleanor Dwight Cook married Frederick Robertson Jones in 1905. Her husband was an economist. They had two daughters, Eleanor and Katharine. Her husband died in 1941, and she died in 1965, aged 84 years, at a hospital in Riverhead, Long Island.
