= Mary Dennett =

American activist and pacifist (1872–1947)

Mary Coffin Ware Dennett
- Mary Ware Dennett, ca. 1892–1896. Courtesy of Schlesinger Library
- Born: April 4, 1872 in Worcester, Massachusetts
- Died: July 25, 1947 (aged 75) in Valatie, New York
- Occupation: Activist

Mary Coffin Ware Dennett (April 4, 1872 – July 25, 1947) was an American women's rights activist, pacifist, homeopathic advocate, and pioneer in the areas of birth control, sex education, and women's suffrage. She co-founded the National Birth Control League in 1915 together with Jessie Ashley and Clara Gruening Stillman. She founded the Voluntary Parenthood League, served in the National American Women's Suffrage Association, and co-founded the Twilight Sleep Association with Margaret Sanger. She also wrote The Sex Side of Life, a famous pamphlet on sex education and birth control. A legal case against her, United States v. Dennett, became the catalyst for overturning the Comstock laws.

== Biography ==
=== Early life ===
Mary Coffin Ware Dennett was born April 4, 1872, in her hometown Worcester, Massachusetts. Dennett was the second child of four born to George and Vonie Ware. At age 10, her father died of cancer. Her mother supported the family by organizing European tours for young women. While her mother was absent on tours, Dennett and her siblings often lived with their Aunt Lucia Ames Mead. Dennett came from a family of social reformers.

=== Education ===
Dennett enrolled in the School of Art and Design in the Boston Museum of Fine Arts in 1891 and graduated with first honors, then took a teaching position at the Drexel Institute of Art in Philadelphia in 1894. She also held a position at Drexel Institute teaching design and decoration from 1894 to 1897.

=== Marriage and children ===
Dennett married William Hartley Dennett, an architect, in 1900. They shared the ideal of the Arts and Crafts movement and soon bought a farmhouse in Framingham, Massachusetts. They founded an architectural and interior design firm. In addition to her work as an interior designer and guadamacile maker, Dennett continued to lecture and write about the Arts and Crafts movement.

The Dennetts’ first child a son named Carlton was born in December 1900, after a difficult labor that nearly killed Dennett. After another difficult labor, their second child, a son, named Appleton was born in 1903. However the baby was frail and died 3 weeks later. A third child was born in 1905, another boy named Devon, again after a difficult labor. Following this labor Dennett became ill and had to give up her professional work in order to recover. This time the doctor told Mary Dennett that she should not have any more children, due to a laceration in her uterus that required corrective surgery. However, her doctor did not give them any information or guidance on birth control, rather he suggested she practice abstinence. This experience profoundly influenced Dennett's later advocacy for improved maternal health and women's bodily autonomy. Later Dennett wrote of their lack of information on birth control:

I was utterly ignorant of the control of conception, as was my husband also. We had never had anything like normal relations, having approximated almost complete abstinence in the endeavor to space our babies."

=== Divorce and notoriety ===
In 1904, Dennett's husband, William Hartley Dennett, began work on a house for Dr. Heman Lincoln Chase and his wife Margaret. Hartley Dennett and Margaret Chase eventually developed an extremely close relationship, culminating in William Hartley Dennett moving out of his and Mary's house in 1909 and abandoning their two children. Dennett filed for divorce in 1912, which was a rare and socially scandalous thing to do at that time. The courts finalized Dennett's divorce and granted her full custody of her children in 1913.

Motivated by both a desire to escape the unpleasant realities of her life and William Hartley Dennett's refusal to financially support his children, Mary Dennett returned to working outside the home, but not in her previous career as an artist and interior designer. In 1908 she accepted the position of field secretary of the Massachusetts Women's Suffrage Association, beginning a long career in public advocacy for women's rights.

In 1915, Dennett's name was again in the newspapers, against her wishes. Her ex-husband Hartley Dennett, his partner Margaret Chase, and her husband Dr. Chase extended a public invitation to Mary Dennett to, as one newspaper put it, "adopt the creed of harmonious love and form a quadrangle" with the three of them. Dennett feared the negative effect that her involuntary notoriety might have on the organizations she worked with and considered resigning from the Twilight Sleep Association.

== Women's suffrage ==
Dennett did not become active in the women's suffrage movement until her marriage began to break up. Later, she wrote, "I went into suffrage work, as perhaps you know, because I needed an anesthetic at the time, and suffrage was the nearest thing at hand that was unconnected with my previous work." She began as field secretary of the Massachusetts Suffrage Association, organizing lectures, rallies, sermons, cheap meals, speaking tours to gather signatures for petitions, and similar outreach efforts. Dennett's opinion on why women deserved the vote was simple: "Our basic principles that 'governments derive their just powers from the consent of the governed' [...] undeniably imply the right of women to direct representation by the vote, since women are governed and women are people."

In 1910, Dennett's success in Massachusetts led the National American Woman Suffrage Association to aggressively recruit her for the position of Corresponding Secretary, reporting to Dr. Anna Howard Shaw. At the time, the NAWSA was riven by factional conflict. Taking the job required Dennett to move from Boston to New York City, a hardship for her since she couldn't afford to move her children with her. Dennett successfully resolved much of the internal conflict in NAWSA within a few months Many prominent NAWSA members credited Dennett with reuniting the NAWSA membership and turning the organization around. In 1910, Washington State granted women the right to vote, the first state to do so in 14 years.

Dennett worked for NAWSA from 1910 to 1914, a period which marked the revival of the women's suffrage movement, which had stagnated during the previous decade. After several years of work and an unsuccessful attempt to reorganize the association to be more effective after seeing wasteful decisions which were overly influenced by wealth donors, she resigned.

== Peace activism and anti-war work ==
During the 1910s, Dennett became active in the peace movement, helping to organize the Women's Peace Party and later working with the World Peace Foundation. Her anti-war advocacy was grounded in the belief that education and social welfare were essential to preventing future conflicts. She lectured widely and produced pamphlets connecting peace activism with women's civic responsibility.

When the European war broke out in 1914, Dennett joined the Women's Peace Party, an anti-war movement. In 1916, she served as field secretary for the American Union against Militarism, founded by small group in New York in 1915, opposing the growing war mentality in the U.S., military preparedness, and U.S. entry into World War I, she helped to organize meetings in several large cities. Dennett's work to re-elect Woodrow Wilson (under the belief that he would not declare war) led to a respected job as executive secretary for the League for Progressive Democracy. She resigned after Wilson decided to enter the United States into the war in 1917.

She next co-founded and was employed by the People's Council of America, a radical, socialist-influenced anti-war organization inspired by the Bolsheviks. She participated in organizing drives, and grassroots outreach aimed at linking peace, social reform, and civic education. She also worked to elect Morris Hillquit, the Socialist, for mayor of New York City in 1917.

After working in anti-war movement for years, she shifted some of her energies back to reproductive-rights and sex-education work.

== 'Twilight sleep' and the Twilight Sleep Association ==
The term 'twilight sleep' references the use of a scopolamine-morphine mixture to anaesthetise women in labor; reducing the pains for the mother during the birthing process. Suffragists and women's rights advocates started the Twilight Sleep Association to urge doctors and female patients to embrace the practice of its use to encourage childbirth reform and challenge traditional medical and gender norms.

Activists argued that using 'twilight sleep' revolutionizes childbirth. This process allows for the birthing to become less dangerous and painful, thus allowing women to more control over their birth experience especially during a time when maternal mortality was high despite advancements in medical obstetrics.

However, many physicians opposed the practice, arguing that it was dangerous for patients and their children and not on par the expectations for proper womanhood and motherly duty.

The Twilight Sleep Association was co-founded in 1913 by Mary Dennett and Margret Sanger, Dennett served as acting president until 1914, then as vice president. Its goal was to encourage the use of 'twilight sleep' in standard practice. The association promoted twilight sleep using pamphlets, lectures, and appeals to hospitals to standardize the procedure, under the argument that that birth should and must become safer, more sanitary, and less traumatic for women.

Advocates of twilight sleep argued that pain relief during childbirth is not merely just a much needed medical improvement, but as a means to normalize women's autonomy, bodily control, and dignity. The movement to encourage twilight sleep was fundamentally a part of the women's rights, reproductive justice, and childbirth reform.

== Birth control movement ==
Dennett's first delivery was long and almost fatal. With no birth control available to her, she became pregnant for the final time in 1904. Three doctors cautioned Mary and her husband not to have any more children by practicing abstinence, but none of them provided the slightest bit of information about birth control. During this time, the distribution of birth control information and devices was illegal under state and federal law, and information about ovulation, fertility, and other reproductive facts was essentially unknown.

In 1914, Dennett met Margaret Sanger, a birth control advocate. Dennett was intrigued, but did not feel financially secure enough to join the birth control movement at the time. In 1915, Dennett wrote a sex education pamphlet for her children, The Sex Side of Life, as the result of the lack of any existing educational material that met her standards, which included scientific correctness, sex-positivity, and discussion of the emotional side of sexual relationships. In 1915, William Sanger was arrested for distributing Margaret Sanger's birth control pamphlet catalyzed the birth control movement in the United States.

After William Sanger's arrest for distributing birth control information inspired a resurgence in the American birth control movement, Dennett co-founded The National Birth Control League in 1915 with Jesse Ashley and Clara Gruening Stillman. Dennett decided to start by rallying public support to strike down laws restricting birth control information. Later, as the NBCL faltered, she resigned as executive secretary and founded a new organization, the Voluntary Parenthood League. She used lobbying and lectures to promote the cause.

In 1918, she became the NBCL's executive secretary and started a campaign to make birth control information legal, giving lectures and lobbying state legislatures to change the laws. During this time, her pamphlet on sex education, "The Sex Side of Life," was published. Later, as the NBCL faltered, she resigned as executive secretary and founded a new organization, the Voluntary Parenthood League, which focused on repealing anti-birth control information laws at the federal level. In 1918, she also published a position paper titled "Birth Control, War and Population," where she voiced concern for a resolution passed by the neo-Malthusian Society regarding concerns about overpopulation. Dennett argued against eugenic-based population control and advocated instead for social and economic reform.

In 1929, Dennett was arrested for mailing and distributing The Sex Side of Life on basis of violating the Comstock Act, a federal law that restricted the distribution of materials that were deemed 'obscene.' In 1930, however, her conviction was overturned by the U.S. Circuit Court of Appeals, ruling her pamphlet as educational rather than obscene. This was a landmark decision that helped to liberalize American obscenity law.

=== Fight for "straight repeal" to allow birth control information ===
Beginning in 1919, Dennett focused on a "straight repeal" of the birth control provisions of the Comstock Act at the federal level, rather than state-by-state efforts. She lobbied Congress to simply remove the words "prevention of conception" from federal obscenity statutes. Dennett repeatedly lobbied individual senators in person for a year before she found one willing to sponsor the bill, Senator H. Heisler Ball, a former practicing physician. However, he never introduced the bill.

In 1921, Dennett changed her approach and decided to work directly with the postmaster general, whose responsibility it was to enforce the laws banning distribution of birth control information through the mails (although in practice this was not enforced). Postmaster General William Hayes seemed sympathetic, but resigned before taking any action. His replacement, Dr. Hubert Work, was adamantly opposed to birth control information, earlier stating that his opinions on birth control could be summarized as "sterilize all boys and girls who are unfit to become parents, and then let nature take its course unhindered."

Dennett returned to lobbying Congress in 1922, pointing out that private opinion of members of congress must be in favor of birth control since the average number of children of a member of congress was 2.7. She continued to have difficulty finding sponsors for the bill, but succeeded in 1923 when Senator Albert B. Cummins introduced the straight repeal bill in the Senate. However, the bill made no further progress during that session, since Cummins was unable to succeed in getting the rest of the Senate to vote on it due to mass absenteeism when it came up for a vote.

In the next session of Congress, Representative William N. Vaile sponsored the bill in the House of Representatives. However, it was also stalled continually and never came to a vote. In addition, Margaret Sanger and her organization lobbied in favor of a version of the bill that would allow birth control information to doctors only, and lobbied against the "straight repeal" bill. In 1925, Dennett gave up on passing the "straight repeal" bill and retired from her position at the VPL.

Dennett achieved her goal in an entirely different manner in 1930, by winning an appeal of her conviction for distribution of birth control information under the Comstock Act.

== The Sex Side of Life and trial under the Comstock Act ==
Mary Ware Dennett published the sex education pamphlet, “The Sex Side of Life,” in 1915, originally for the benefit of her sons as she was unable to find any adequate books on the subject. Many existing sexual-education publications either contained inaccurate information or used fear and shame tactics to dissuade the youth from having sex. Consequently, she decided to write her own explanation using research and interviews she conducted with doctors. She passed the writing along to her friends with adolescent children. In 1918, it was published in Medical Review of Reviews; a year later it was published as a pamphlet. "The Sex Side of Life" became one of the most influential and controversial documents in early 20th-century sexual education. In it, Dennett presented sex as a natural and moral part of human experience, positioning sex as something intrinsically normal and human. Despite being largely banned and censored, it gained popularity rather quickly, widely among parents, educators, and reformers. It laid the groundwork for later progressive sex education curriculum.

The pamphlet was 24 pages long. Dennett used scientific discussion of sex while also including the emotion side of sex relations. The pamphlet covered controversial topics including masturbation, sexually transmitted diseases, prostitution, and support for the use of birth control. Her views were considered radical for this time, because she was not promoting abstinence. See Major Works section for more.

After fours years of being in circulation, the Post Office informed Dennett that the pamphlet was obscene, and therefore it was banned from being mailed under the Comstock Act. She continued to mail out the pamphlet after the Post Office ignored her inquiries of what parts of the pamphlet were obscene.

In 1928, she was indicted under the Comstock laws for distributing her pamphlet. H. L. Mencken observed the proceedings. He had briefly praised Mrs. Dennett's book in the May 1926 issue of The American Mercury, and took a sympathetic interest in her later legal troubles:

There is, of course, nothing indecent in that pamphlet; on the contrary, it is notably prudent and clean. The author wrote it for the instruction of her own young sons, and its superiority to most other such literature was so apparent that it was reprinted at length in a medical journal, and circulated in great numbers by clergymen, Y.M.C.A. secretaries, social workers, and other such chemically pure persons. This went on for four and a half years. Then Mrs. Dennett, who is engaged in birth-control propaganda, began annoying the wowsers of the U.S. Post Office by exposing their gross stupidity and disingenuousness in the enforcement of the Comstock Act, and they retorted by barring her pamphlet from the mails. No plainer case of the use of an idiotic law to punish an inconvenient critic could be imagined.

Eventually a safe jury was empanelled by the prosecution “and Mrs. Dennett was quickly convicted, and Judge Burrows fined her $300. The jury was composed entirely of "middle-aged family men". The American Civil Liberties Union (ACLU) supported and sponsored Dennett (its general counsel, Morris Ernst, was her defense attorney), maintaining that her pamphlet was not obscene. In fact, it was an important educational tool for the youth. Six months later the Circuit Court of Appeals, consisting of [Thomas Walker?] Swan, Augustus Noble Hand and Chase, JJ, set aside the verdict, decided that the pamphlet was so obviously not obscene that ‘no case was made for submission to the jury,’ and ordered Mrs. Dennett released from her bond.”

When the United States Court of Appeals for the Second Circuit overturned her conviction in 1930, the Court set a legal precedent that took intent into account in the evaluation of obscenity. Dennett's trial was part of a series of rulings that culminated in the 1936 ruling in United States v. One Package of Japanese Pessaries, which exempted birth control information and materials used by physicians from obscenity laws.

== Major works ==
=== The Real Point ===
In this piece, Mary Dennett asks the reader to think about women and children under the US legal system. She argues that men have never had to justify why they have a right to vote. She wrote “The Real Point” around 1911 and 1915 advocating for equal voting rights. When women advocated for the right to vote, Dennett states, on the contrary, men are never asked “if all men want to vote, “if he thinks the laws need changing”, “if he will promise to better the laws”, “to give statistics showing whether men have previously used their votes to better the laws”, if he is sure he can still be a good father, and “to remain attractive” after voting. She wishes for everyone to “concentrate all our energies on the real point- namely, that the qualifications for voting shall be made without regard to sex.”

=== The Sex Side of Life ===
Dennett wrote the pamphlet, “The Sex Side of Life'' in 1915. Majority of Dennett’s pamphlet was directed towards adolescents and its goal was to inform teenagers about safe sex and sex education. She described sex as passionate and emotional, which was extremely different from how sex was described at the time. Sex was represented solely for reproduction reasons and not for pleasure. She graphically described sex organs, sexual intercourse, and orgasms. She also wrote about birth control methods, contraception, and sexually transmitted diseases. She advocated for masturbation to be more normalized. These thoughts were revolutionary, yet highly controversial for the time period.

Dennett begins her pamphlet with sharing how much of the human experience is universal. She believed that everyone has similar thoughts and feelings, yet we are too embarrassed or uncomfortable to share with others. Her pamphlet helped people feel less alone. Dennett read other booklets pertaining to sex and sex education and didn’t feel comfortable with any of the information provided. This led her to write her own. Dennett shares her perspective of love and normalizes falling out of love. Dennett covered topics from masturbation, labor, and sexually transmitted diseases. Dennett also used detailed diagrams so her readers could easily visualize sex organs.

=== Birth Control Laws: Shall We Keep Them Change Them or Abolish Them ===
Dennett published “Birth Control Laws: Shall We Keep Them Change Them or Abolish Them” in 1926. Her main focus was to share her opinions and encourage a discussion concerning how necessary the laws pertaining to birth control are in the United States. She questioned if it would be best to modify the existing laws or completely change them. Her piece consists of explaining the current laws during the time, the laws at a federal level, congress’ role, physicians role, how society views these laws, and her opinions of how the future should look.

== Criticism ==
Criticism arose from this work. Many believed that her book was propaganda, aiming to spread misinformation. Frederick H. Hitchcock wrote in 1936, “This book is obviously propaganda for the removal of federal and state restrictions on the importation, manufacture and distribution of devices and materials wherewith to prevent conception and for the removal of restrictions on the dissemination of information concerning the prevention of conception.”

James E. Wilkinson was the prosecutor during Dennett's trial for sending her pamphlet through the US mail. He blamed Dennett for bringing the younger generation “not only into the gutter, but below the gutter into the sewer.” After Dennett mentioned birth control, Wilkinson responded with, "What will happen to America if our national standards fall so low? Where will our soldiers come from in our hour of need? God help America if we haven't men to defend her in that hour.".

On April 24, 1929, the New York Times published an article titled, "Mrs. Dennett Guilty In Sex Booklet Case". Prosecuting attorney James Wilkinson described the booklet as "pure and simple smut" and stated "If I can stand between this woman and the children of the land I will have accomplished something".

Following the court case, several New York newspapers criticized the results. The World called the decision “deeply disturbing”. The Telegram reported the results as "inquisitional injustice”. Post wrote the verdict was “unfair and absurd by an overwhelming public sentiment”.

== Legacy ==
Dennett was a major advocate and leading voice at her time in the fight for access to birth control and reproductive freedom. Her legal battle under the Comstock Act, The United States v. Dennett, became an important case that is still cited in legal and historical accounts today. Dennett's trial began in April 1929. Only lasting three days. The judge was openly appalled by her pamphlet The Sex Side of Life. Forty-two minutes after deliberating, the all male jury found Dennett guilty. At her sentencing Dennett stated that she would not pay the fine. Her appeal went to court in 1930 where she was acquitted.

Dennett died aged 75 in 1947. Dennett's beliefs and her legacy, however, did not die with her. Leaving behind the fight for individuals to know and control their own bodies, a fight that is still being fought for today.

== See also ==
- History of the birth control movement in the United States

== Notes ==
- Chen, Constance M. (June 1996). The Sex Side of Life. Chicago Tribune. ISBN 1565841328.
- Mencken, H. L. (June 1930). "The Smut-Snufflers". American Mercury. 20 (78).

== Publications ==
- The Sex Side of Life: An Explanation for Young People
- What Birth Control Means: Why Women Want Self-Determined Parenthood (Physical Culture, July 1922)
- Works by Mary Ware Dennett at Project Gutenberg
- Papers, 1874-1945. Schlesinger Library, Radcliffe Institute, Harvard University.
