= Jessie Ashley =

American lawyer, socialist, and feminist

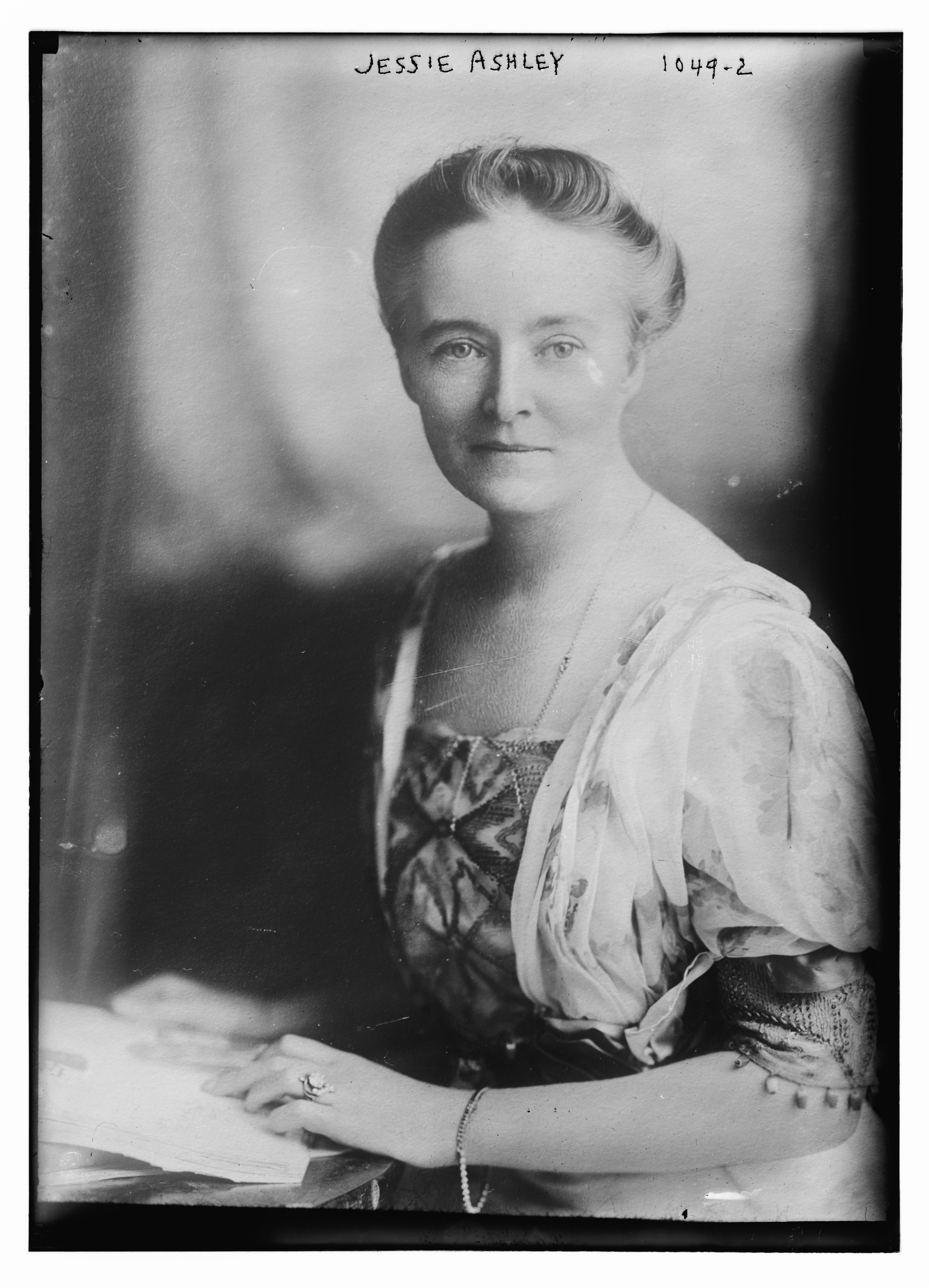
Jessie Ashley

Jessie Ashley (1861–1919) was an American lawyer, socialist, and feminist. Born into a wealthy family, she entered law school at age 39 and became a radical lawyer with a foot in two worlds.

A founder of the National Birth Control League, Ashley served on the editorial board for Margaret Sanger's Birth Control Review during the 1910s. As an attorney, she worked on behalf of radical labor activists and was a regular activist for the Industrial Workers of the World, involved in the 1911 textile workers' strike in Lowell, Massachusetts and the 1913 Paterson silk strike. At the same time, she served as the treasurer of the National American Woman Suffrage Association (NAWSA). Her Socialist politics were an uneasy fit for the very mainstream NAWSA, and eventually she stepped down.

== Legal career ==
Ashley graduated from NYU Law School in 1902. Her brother Clarence Ashley was the dean, and under his tenure the school moved to admit women. Few law schools allowed women to enroll in 1900, so NYU gathered a cohort of talented, ambitious women. Ashley and her classmates Ida Rauh and Madeleine Zabriskie Doty lived in Greenwich Village after graduating, and along with Elizabeth Pope, Ashley and Doty created their own law firm.

Ashley helped force open the clubby world of New York legal practice - both to women as lawyers and to activists with radical politics. She was a member of the New York County Lawyers' Association, one of the first such associations to admit women, and maintained a law practice with other women or as a solo practitioner. She also served as an examiner for the New York Bar, and taught at NYU.

She and Bill Haywood were lovers. She died of pneumonia on January 20, 1919.
