= Woman's Peace Party =

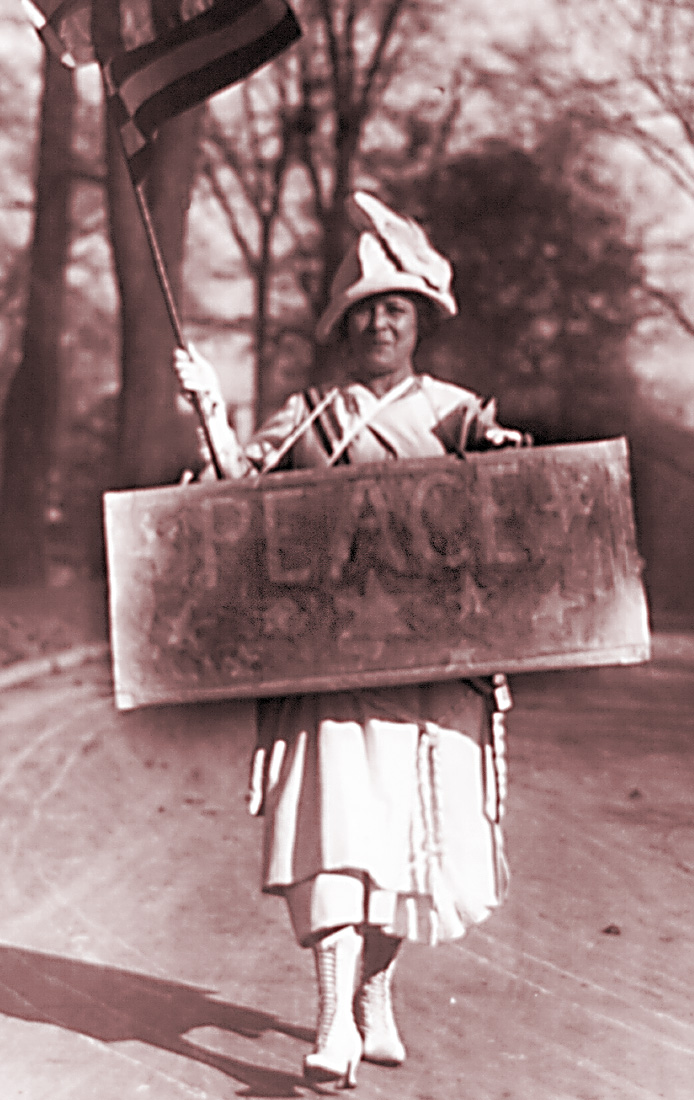
A World War I-era female peace protester

The Woman's Peace Party (WPP) was an American pacifist and feminist organization formally established in January 1915 in response to World War I. The organization is remembered as the first American peace organization to make use of direct action tactics such as public demonstration. The Woman's Peace Party became the American section of an international organization known as the International Committee of Women for Permanent Peace later in 1915, a group which later changed its name to the Women's International League for Peace and Freedom.

== American Pacifist Forerunners ==
Prior to the establishment of the Woman's Peace Party, the three leading American pacifist organizations of national stature were essentially conservative enterprises, viewing the peace movement's mission as one of extending stability, order, and the expansion of venerable American institutions.

The American Peace Society (BBC), established in 1828, was the oldest of the previously existing pacifist organizations and suffered from what one historian has called "over seven decades of accumulated Victorianism. Typified by the detached conservative nobility of corporate attorney Elihu Root, the APS was dedicated to demonstrating the incompatibility between war and Christianity and throughout its existence had remained small, impoverished, and ineffectual. By the time of World War I, it had been reduced in status to that of a veritable subsidiary of the Carnegie Endowment for International Peace.

The Carnegie Endowment was launched by industrialist Andrew Carnegie in 1910 with a $10 million endowment. The Endowment became effectively a university publishing house for the peace movement, concentrating on academic research and the printed word rather than oratory.

The third of the primary American peace organizations of the first decade of the 20th century was the World Peace Foundation (WPF), a group established in 1909 by millionaire Boston publisher Edwin Ginn as "Edwin Ginn's International School for Peace." This organization was launched with a $1 million endowment and carried on publishing activities, changing its name to the WPF in 1911. As with the Carnegie Foundation, the WPF limited its activities largely to research and publication, attempting to influence political decision-makers with ideas rather than to stir the fires of popular sentiment.

Much like the trustified world of big business of the day, the peace movement was characterized by interlocking directorates of the various organizations, with a very few men and no women wielding decisive influence over the movement by virtue of the power of the pocketbook. The American peace movement was, in short, part of the political establishment, with dinner meetings of the New York Peace Society likened by one contemporary to "a banquet of the Chamber of Commerce."

== Woman's Peace Parade ==
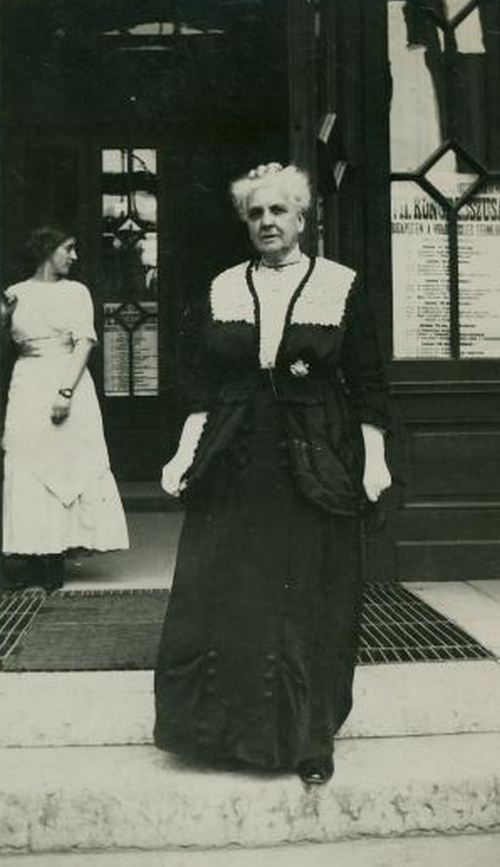
Fanny Garrison Villard, daughter of William Lloyd Garrison, chair of the August 1914 Woman's Peace Parade Committee, and initiator of the Woman's Peace Party

Although the establishment of a permanent organization did not follow for more than four months, the roots of the Woman's Peace Party lay in a protest march of 1,500 women in New York City on August 29, 1914. This "Woman's Peace Parade" was organized less than a month after the outbreak of hostilities in World War I and featured a silent procession down Fifth Avenue behind a white banner bearing a dove in front of somber crowds lining the streets.

The chair of the Woman's Peace Parade committee was Fanny Garrison Villard, a 70-year-old veteran of the peace movement. Her son, Oswald Garrison Villard, later recalled the scene:

"There were no bands; there was dead silence and the crowds watched the parade in the spirit of the marchers, with sympathy and approval. The President had also approved, for the organizers, in complete sympathy with his public statements of the early days of the conflict, had courteously asked him for his consent. He was especially pleased by the decision of the paraders to carry no flags except the peace flag and to have no set speeches at the conclusion of the parade, but brief informal addresses were made to all who would listed....

"The silence, the dignity, the black dresses of the marchers — those who did not have black dresses wore black arm bands — the solemnity of the crowds, all of these produced a profound effect on the beholders."

The Woman's Peace Parade marked a change of methods of the peace movement. Older American peace organizations limited themselves to working behind the scenes, attempting to influence policy through regular political channels. The Peace Parade, on the other hand, made use of direct action, attempting to build popular support for peace through public demonstration in the same way that labor organizations had historically fought for policies and settlements which were important to them. With this tactical shift, the Woman's Peace Parade and the organization which emerged from it, the Woman's Peace Party, effectively marked the beginning of the modern peace movement.

In the aftermath of the march, Fanny Garrison Villard sought to transform the temporary organization constructed to coordinate the march into a permanent group. Villard called upon one of her old rivals in the women's movement, Carrie Chapman Catt, President of the International Woman Suffrage Alliance to help in this regard. Catt, a former associate of Susan B. Anthony, was fixated upon the struggle for women's right to vote and did not see the peace march as a likely vehicle for a change of public sentiment or national policy. Still, Catt was won over to the idea that the American suffrage movement stood to gain in support and stature if women could gain a prominent role in the noble struggle for an end to the European bloodbath.

In the middle of December 1914, Catt was finally persuaded to give full effort for the launch of a national women's peace organization. She wrote to settlement worker Jane Addams of Hull House in Chicago, attempting to bring her into the forthcoming organization as its leader. Addams had long believed in a close interrelationship between international peace, domestic humanitarian reform, and women's right to vote and was won over to the idea of a national women's peace movement. The stage was set for a formal launch of the new organization — a group to be called the Woman's Peace Party.

== Foundation convention ==
The Woman's Peace Party was established at an organizational convention held in Washington, DC on January 9–10, 1915. The gathering was attended by more than 100 delegates representing women's organizations from around the United States.

Jane Addams was elected President of the new organization by the convention and given the power to select a Secretary and Treasurer for the group, which was to be headquartered in Addams' home city of Chicago. Membership in the new organization was open to all groups willing to repurpose themselves also as a "peace circle" and to any woman paying a $1 annual membership fee. Officers ultimately included Lucia Ames Mead as National Secretary, Harriet P. Thomas as Executive Secretary, Sophonisba P. Breckinridge as Treasurer, and Elizabeth Glendower Evans as National Organizer.

The convention approved a platform calling for the immediate convocation of "a convention of neutral nations in the interest of an early peace," the limitation of armaments, organized opposition to militarism (or military intervention) in America, democratization of foreign policy, removal of the economic motivation for war, and the expansion of the electoral franchise for women. The right of women to vote was seen by the female participants in the organization as part-and-parcel of the cause for peace, based on the presumption that women were inclined by nature to be oriented towards the nurturing of human life.

The founding convention also approved a supplemental "Program for Constructive Peace" which demanded that the American government to call a conference of neutral nations and declared that, failing that, "the party itself will call an unofficial conference of pacifists from the world over" to determine a course of action. To ensure that the current war was not merely a prelude for another, the program called for a peace based upon no transfers of territory without the will of the involved people, no indemnities to be assessed outside those in accordance with international law, and no treaties between nations to be established without ratification of representatives of the people.

Activities concluded with a mass meeting held in the ballroom of the New Willard Hotel on Sunday, January 10, which was filled to capacity. An additional overflow meeting was held in another room but still some 500 interested people had to be turned away for lack of space. Speeches were delivered to this gathering by Jane Addams, and feminist activists Emmeline Pethick-Lawrence of England, Rosika Schwimmer of Hungary, among others.

== 1915 International Congress of Women ==
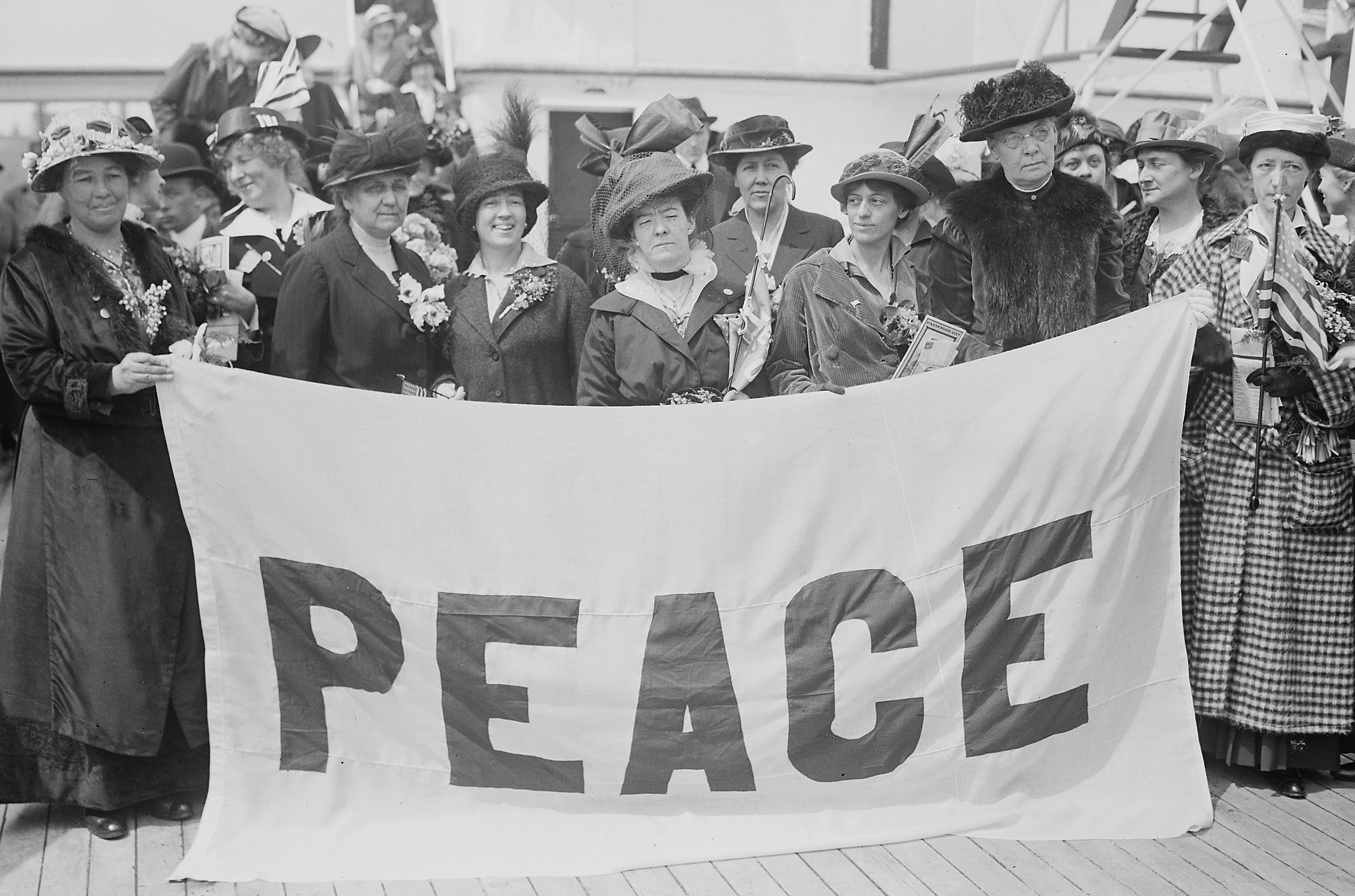
Delegates to the April 1915 Women's International Congress for Peace and Freedom aboard the MS Noordam with their blue and white "PEACE" banner

The ongoing war in Europe forced the cancellation of the scheduled biennial convention of the International Woman Suffrage Alliance, which had been slated for Berlin in 1915. The cancellation of the German gathering provided an opportunity for the women's peace movement to hold an international gathering of their own, and a call was issued for a convention to be held in the neutral Netherlands. Jane Addams, President of the Woman's Peace Party and arguably the most respected and influential woman in America was invited to preside over the conclave.

In April 1915, 47 women, including many members of the Woman's Peace Party along with representatives of other organizations, boarded the Dutch cruise ship the MS Noordam for the dangerous journey to The Hague. Among those making the trip through mine-strewn waters were social worker Grace Abbott, epidemiologist Alice Hamilton, the labor journalist Mary Heaton Vorse, radical trade unionist Leonora O'Reilly, and academic and future Nobel Peace Prize winner Emily Balch.

The trip was not without controversy, despite America's formally neutral status, with former President Theodore Roosevelt declaring the women's mission "silly and base" and calling the women cowards who sought peace "without regard to righteousness." The American women were not dissuaded, sailing into danger with a homemade blue and white banner that bore the single word, "PEACE."

The Noordam was held up for four days in the English Channel by the Royal Navy but was ultimately allowed to proceed to The Hague, which it arrived barely in time for the start of the three-day congress on the evening of April 28, 1915. Despite the decision of some combatant nations, such as Great Britain, to deny its citizens passports which would have allowed them to participate in the Congress, the gathering still proved to be a massive event, bringing together 1,136 delegates and more than 2,000 visitors.

The congress drafted a series of resolutions detailing plans for a just peace, calling for general disarmament and the removal of the profit motive through nationalizing the production of armaments, and asserting the benefits of free trade and freedom of navigation on the high seas. A resolution calling for continuous mediation of disputes by a conference of neutral nations was passed, but ultimately failed to come to fruition. A delegation headed by Addams was dispatched to the capitals of the belligerent powers but it, too, proved ineffectual.

Before adjourning, the congress established a new international organization called the International Committee of Women for Permanent Peace. The Woman's Peace Party came to regard itself as the American section of this organization.

== Name change ==
In 1921 the International Committee of Women for Permanent Peace formally changed its name to the Women's International League for Peace and Freedom.

== Legacy ==
An archive of the records of the Woman's Peace Party from 1915 to 1920 resides at Swarthmore College in Swarthmore, Pennsylvania as part of its Peace Collection.

== Prominent members ==
- Jane Addams
- Fannie Fern Andrews
- Sophonisba P. Breckenridge
- Carrie Chapman Catt
- Laura Clay
- Alice Lorraine Daly
- Crystal Eastman
- Elizabeth Glendower Evans
- Charlotte Perkins Gilman
- Jessie Wallace Hughan
- Hannah Clothier Hull
- Florence Kelley
- Freda Kirchwey
- Fola La Follette
- Lucia Ames Mead
- Rose Standish Nichols
- Alice Thacher Post
- Jeannette Rankin
- Rose Schneiderman
- Anna Howard Shaw
- Harriet P. Thomas
- Fanny Garrison Villard
- Mary Heaton Vorse
- Lillian Wald
- Anna Walling

== See also ==
- List of anti-war organizations
- List of peace activists
- Women's International League for Peace and Freedom
- Carnegie Endowment for International Peace
