= Voluntary Parenthood League =

The Voluntary Parenthood League (VPL) was an organization that advocated for contraception during the birth control movement in the United States. The VPL was founded in 1919 by Mary Dennett. The VPL was a rival organization to Margaret Sanger's American Birth Control League. The VPL lobbied to change anti-contraception laws. In 1925 the VPL merged with the American Birth Control League.
