= Fannie Fern Andrews =

American writer

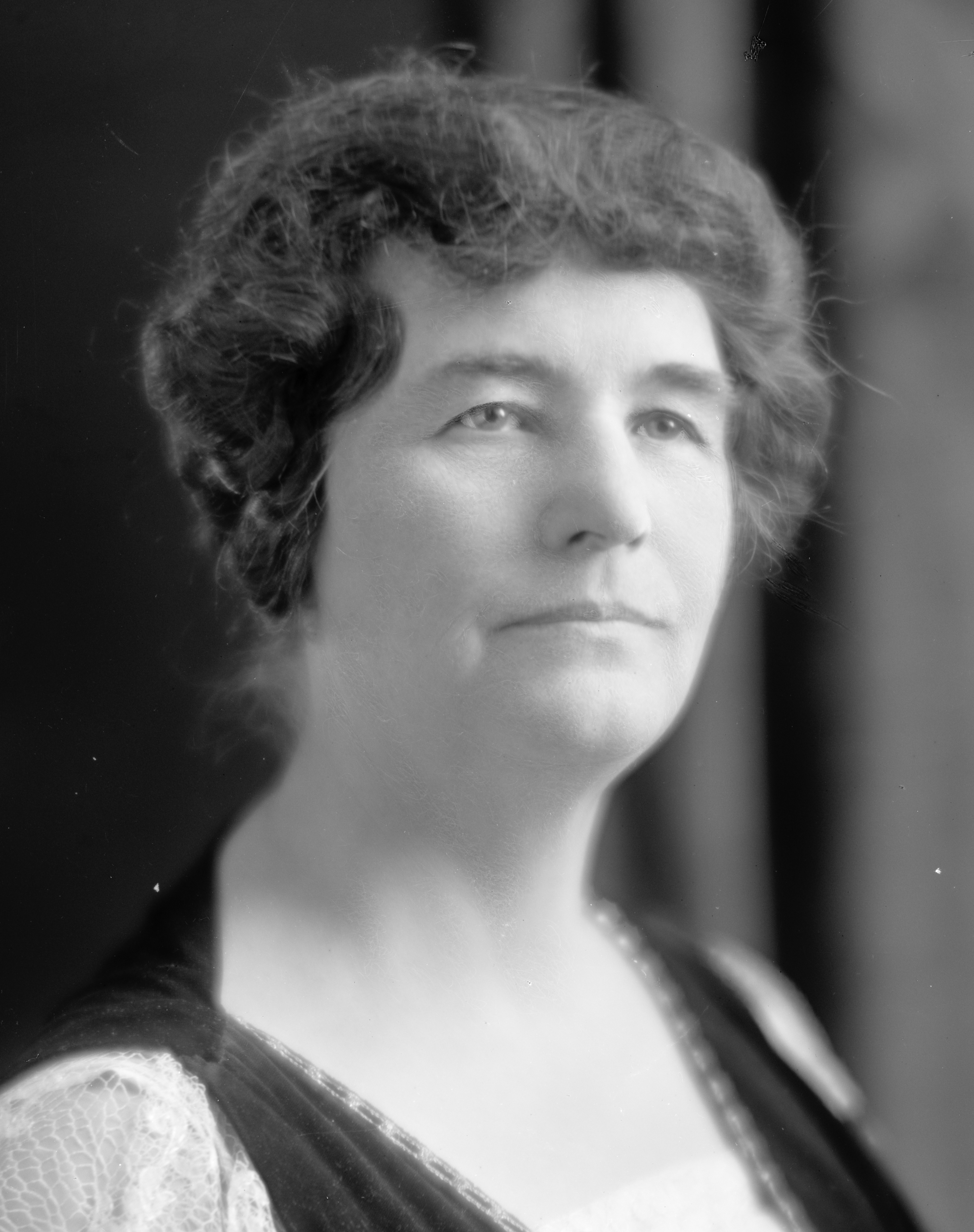
- Born: 25 September 1867; Middleton, Nova Scotia, Canada
- Died: 23 January 1950 (aged 82); Somerville, Massachusetts
- Education: Psychology and Education (Radcliffe College, Harvard Summer School)
- Spouse: Edwin G. Andrews (July 16, 1890)

Fannie Fern Andrews (Phillips) (25 September 1867 – 24 January 1950) was an American lecturer, teacher, social worker, and writer.

== Biography ==
Fannie Fern and Frank Edward Phillips were twins, born on 25 September 1867 at Middleton, Nova Scotia, to Annie M. (née Brown) and William Wallis Phillips. Between 1871 and 1880, the family, which included 5 children, migrated from Middleton to Lynn, Massachusetts. Later, they moved to Salem, where she attended the public schools and graduated from the Salem Normal School. On July 16, 1890, she was married to Edwin G. Andrews. She taught for six years before receiving a degree in psychology and education from Radcliffe College in 1902. She also attended Harvard Summer School.

Andrews founded the Boston Home and School Association in 1907, with the goal of involving students' parents in education. Through her work in the public schools in Boston, she became convinced that differing ethnic and economic backgrounds spurred conflict, and that each must be taught to understand the others in order to communicate and negotiate on peaceful terms.

In 1908, Andrews founded the American Peace League. This organization sought peace by teaching the principles of 'international justice' in American schools. She envisioned an international bureau of education, which would promote understanding among all nations. When World War I broke out, Andrews changed the name of her organization from the "American Peace League" to the "American School Citizenship League" in 1918.

In 1918, after being selected by President Woodrow Wilson, Andrews attended the Paris Peace Conference. She participated in the parallel Inter-Allied Women's Conference and unsuccessfully lobbied for the League of Nations to include a provision for her dream of the international bureau of education. The rejection reasoning was there was too much diversity in the cultures of the different countries to have a standard curriculum that would work for all. Her ideas eventually led to the founding of the International Bureau of Education in Geneva.

In 1920, Andrews earned a Master of Arts degree and in 1923 completed her PhD at Harvard. She was known as a lecturer on education in Europe and America, as secretary and organizer of the American School Citizenship League, and as a member of the advisory council of the Institute of International Education and the International Peace Bureau (Berne, Switzerland), etc. She was also a delegate to the International Conference on Education in 1914 and represented the United States Bureau of Education at Paris during the Peace Conference.

Andrews was an advocate of the ideal of peace education, and promoted action at an official level to obtain curriculum changes. Today's Civil Education classes are a result of the efforts she and others made. She died on 24 January 1950, after a lengthy illness, at the Hillcrest Nursing Home in Somerville, Massachusetts, was cremated at Mount Auburn Cemetery, and was buried at Pine Grove Cemetery in Lynn, Massachusetts.

== Works ==
- The Holy Land Under Mandate (1931)
- The United States and the World (1918)
- The World Family (1918)
- The War - What Should Be Said about it in the Schools? (Boston, 1914)
- Central Organization for a Durable Peace (Boston, 1916)
- Freedom of the Seas (The Hague, 1917)
- A Course in Citizenship and Patriotism (:Houghton Mifflin, 1918)
- A Course in Foreign Relations, prepared for the Army Education Commission (Paris, 1919)
