= Bethesda Terrace and Fountain =

Architectural features in New York City's Central Park

Coordinates: 40.774123°N 73.971135°W

- Public Terrace
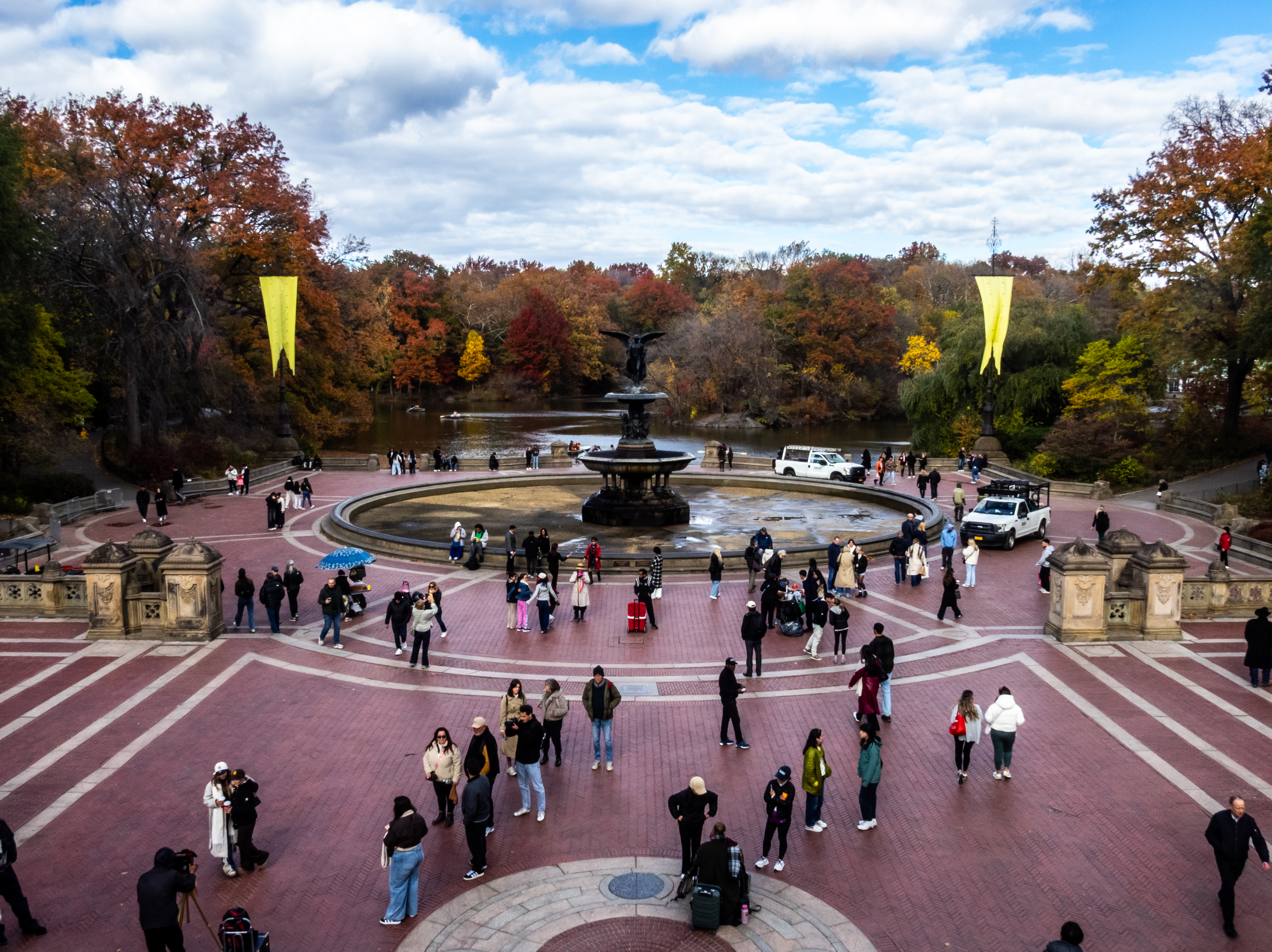
- Bethesda Terrace and Fountain, November 2025
- Design: Calvert Vaux; Frederick Law Olmsted
- Completed: 1873
- Manager: Central Park Conservancy
- Location: Central Park, Manhattan, New York City, New York, USA
- Notable buildings and structures of Central Park. Click on the map and then on the points for details. Interactive map of Central Park

Bethesda Terrace and Fountain are two architectural features overlooking the southern shore of the Lake in New York City's Central Park. The fountain, with its Angel of the Waters statue, is located in the center of the terrace.

Bethesda Terrace's two levels are united by two grand staircases and a lesser one that passes under Terrace Drive. They provide passage southward to the Central Park Mall and Naumburg Bandshell at the center of the park. The upper terrace flanks the 72nd Street Cross Drive and the lower terrace provides a podium for viewing the Lake. The mustard-olive colored carved stone is New Brunswick sandstone, with a harder stone for cappings, with granite steps and landings, and herringbone pattern paving of Roman brick laid on edge.

== History ==
=== Construction ===
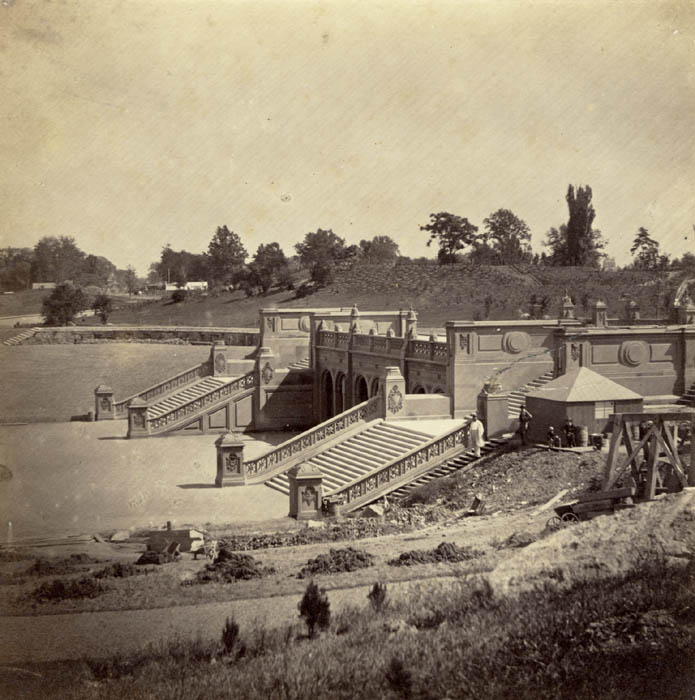
Under construction in 1862

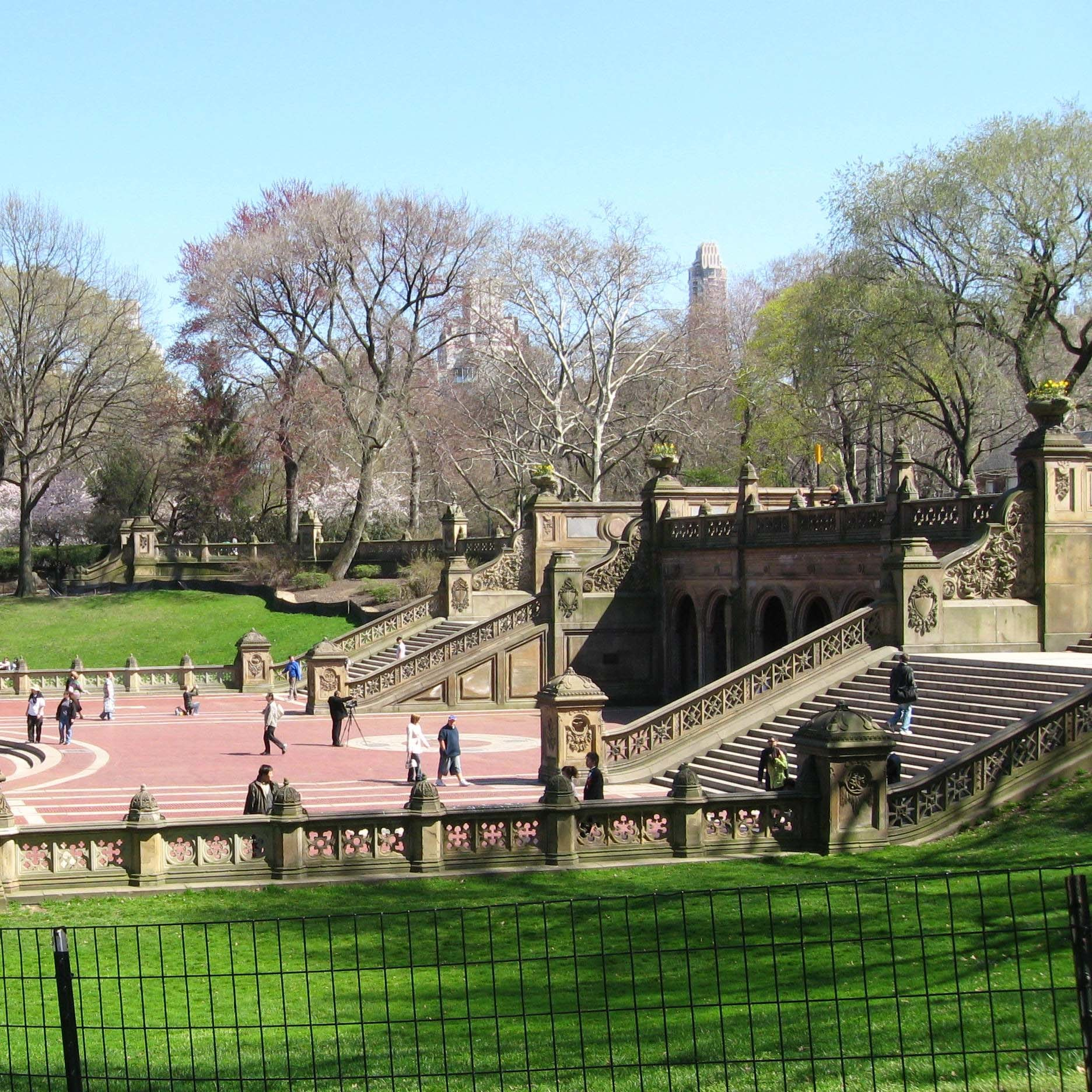
From the same viewpoint in 2008

In Calvert Vaux and Frederick Law Olmsted's 1858 Greensward Plan, the terrace at the end of the Mall overlooking the naturalistic landscape of the Lake was simply called The Water Terrace, but after the unveiling of the angel, its name was changed to Bethesda Terrace.

Construction of the terrace and fountain occurred during the American Civil War. Only two major structures besides the Bethesda Terrace were completed during the Civil War: the Music Stand and the Casino restaurant, both demolished. By the end of 1861, work on Bethesda Terrace was well underway. The stonework to be installed in the terrace arrived in 1862, and the masonry of the fountain was installed by 1863.

In 1864, the stonework of Bethesda Terrace was completed except for minor details, and the Central Park commission hired a sculptor to design the figures for the Fountain. The upper level of the Terrace was mostly built by 1867, by which time the Fountain's figures were being cast in bronze. The original plans had called for marble and bronze figures to be installed on the upper level, but those were not executed. The Bethesda Fountain was officially completed in 1873.

=== Restoration ===
After being abandoned for years except used as a bicycle-rental spot, Bethesda Terrace became a site for The Fountain Cafe, an outdoor luncheon restaurant between 1967 and 1974. It was closed in preparation of restoration work, which did not begin for several years. During this time the site became a congregating spot for the hippie generation before devolving into a drug-trafficking venue in the 1970s. Bethesda Fountain was completely dry by then. By the early 1980s, the stonework had decayed or been damaged; the ceiling of the arcade was leaking; and frost and trees' roots had caused many of the floor surfaces to crack.

The fountain was restored in 1980–1981 by the Central Park Conservancy as the first part of its plan to renovate Central Park. The terrace was restored in 1982, its stonework disassembled, cleaned, deteriorated surfaces removed, restored, patched, and reset. Resodding, and 50 new trees, 3,500 shrubs and 3,000 ground cover plants specified by Philip Winslow followed in 1986. Parts of the balustrade were removed for cleaning and restoration.

The Mintons encaustic tiles of the arcade ceiling were removed in the 1980s renovation because the New York City Landmarks Preservation Commission deemed the tiles too costly to restore. Instead, the Commission approved the commission of a ceiling mural in its place. Mayor Ed Koch declared in June 1987 that the tiles would be restored. The tiles sat in storage for more than 20 years until the Conservancy received a private donation for their restoration. The Conservancy began restoring the tiles for $7 million in 2004, and the tiles were reinstalled in 2007.

The Central Park Conservancy announced in mid-2026 that Bethesda Fountain would also be deactivated that August and renovated for a year. The project is part of a $37 million renovation that also involves Conservatory Water.

== Bethesda Terrace ==
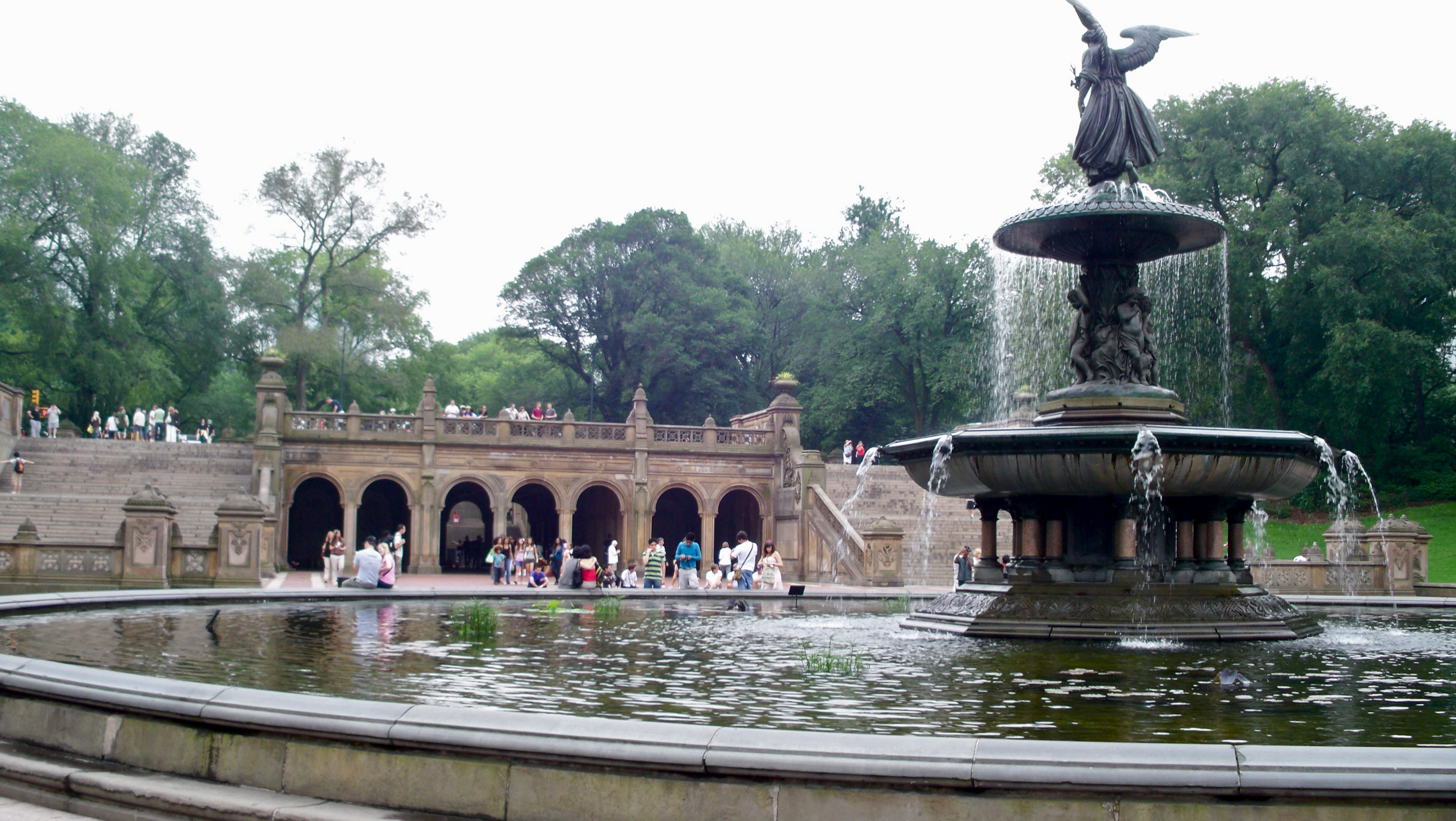
Bethesda Terrace (back) and Bethesda Fountain with its Angel of the Waters statue

Bethesda Terrace and Fountain form the northern end of the Central Park Mall. The mall, which runs from approximately 65th to 73rd Streets, is the only formal feature in the park's original blueprint, the Greensward Plan. Bethesda Terrace is divided into two levels: the upper level (corresponding to the Mall) and the lower level (corresponding to the fountain). The upper level carries a carriage road, which corresponds to 72nd Street. The carriage road, which forms part of the park drives' essential circulation pattern, is supported by a wrought-iron box-girder bridge, concealed beneath a stone cladding. The lower level, which faces The Ramble and Lake to the north, is formally known as the Esplanade. This portion consists of a flagstone plaza with stone parapets and plantings to the west and east, as well as Bethesda Fountain in the center.

South of 72nd Street, a central stairway descends to an arcade underneath the street. The ceiling of the arcade has Minton encaustic tiles designed by Jacob Wrey Mould. There are 14,000 such tiles; most of them are part of the original design, but three panels of replacement tiles were installed during the 2000s renovation. When the park opened, one observer referred to the arcade as a "large and delightfully cool hall".

North of the street, a pair of stairs descends two flights to the lower plaza. The stairs contain stone balustrades with carvings of birds and plants. Jacob Wrey Mould designed the balustrades' sculptural details. The decorations largely contain motifs representing the seasons, similar to illustrations in classical illuminated manuscripts. These include lambs' heads representing spring; butterflies and berries for summer; holly leaves, pine boughs, pine cones, and birds for fall; and firewood for winter. Other motifs were also used in the balustrades, including ice skates, signifying winter; a rooster, signifying longer days in the spring and summer; and a witch on a broomstick, signifying Halloween. At the tops of the stairs, the balustrade on 72nd Street contains a scroll motif with birds and flowering plants.

== Bethesda Fountain ==
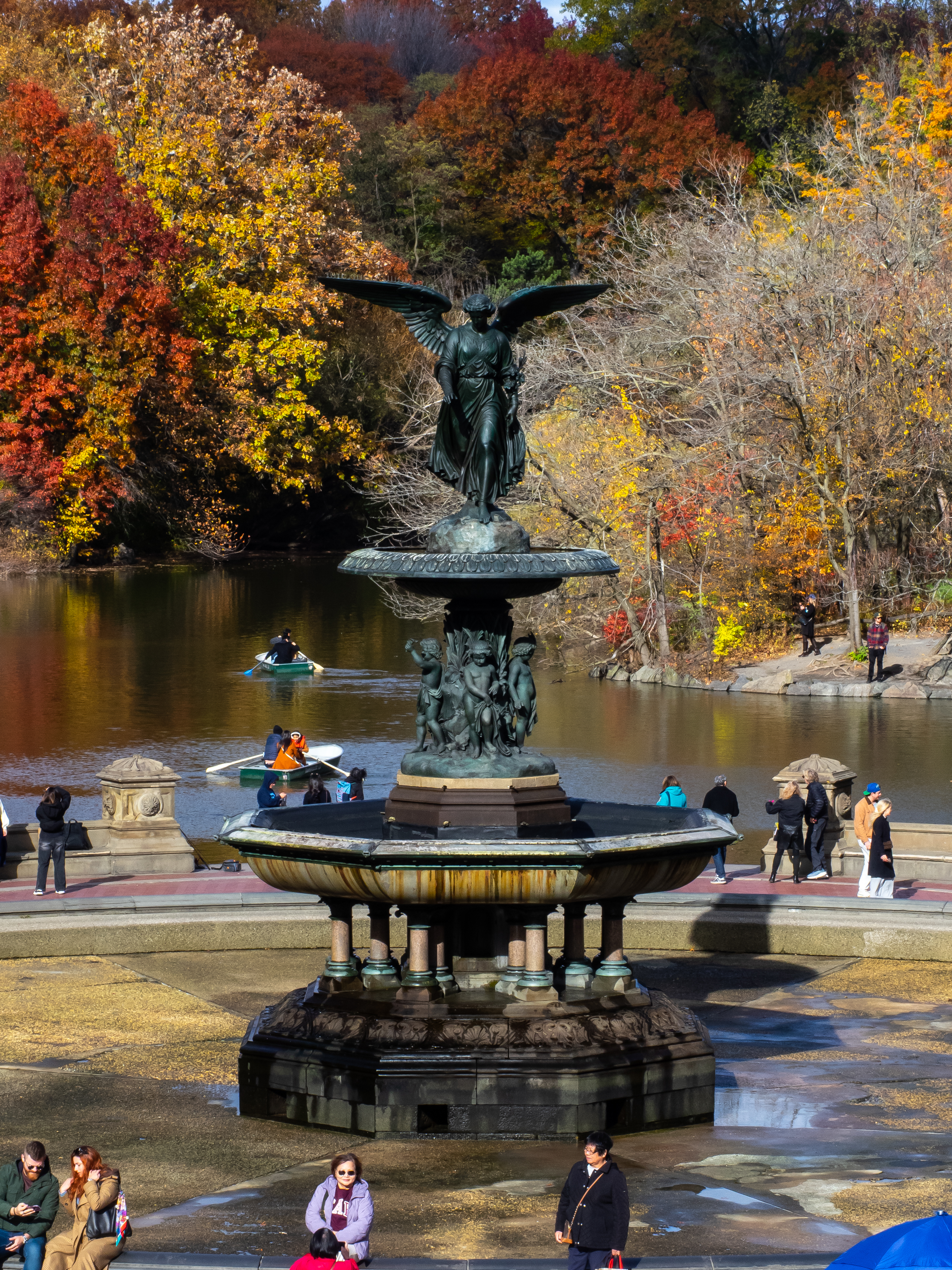
Bethesda Fountain in 2025

Bethesda Fountain is the central feature on the lower level of the terrace. The pool is centered by a fountain sculpture designed by Emma Stebbins in 1868 and unveiled in 1873. Also called the Angel of the Waters, the statue refers to the biblical healing of a disabled man at Bethesda, a story from the Gospel of John about an angel blessing the Pool of Bethesda, giving it healing powers. It was the only statue funded by the city in the original design for the park. Stebbins was the first woman to receive a public commission for a major work of art in New York City.

The 8-foot (2.4 m) bronze statue depicts a female winged angel touching down upon the top of the fountain, where water spouts and cascades into an upper basin and into the surrounding pool. Beneath her are four four-foot cherubs representing temperance, purity, health, and peace. The statue alludes to the Croton Aqueduct, the first pure-water aqueduct in New York City, which opened in 1842 on the site of Central Park. The angel carries a lily in one hand, representing purity, and with the other hand she blesses the water below. The lower basin has water lilies, lotus, and papyrus, inspired by an illustration in an 1891 book by Vaux's assistant and partner Samuel Parsons, the Superintendent of Planting in Central Park.

The base of the fountain was designed by Calvert Vaux, with sculptural details by Mould. The panels of carving in the abstracted organic style propounded by Owen Jones, a mentor of the sculptor Jacob Wrey Mould are organized by an iconographical program of themes: the Seasons, the Times of Day, the Ages of Mankind.

== Gallery ==
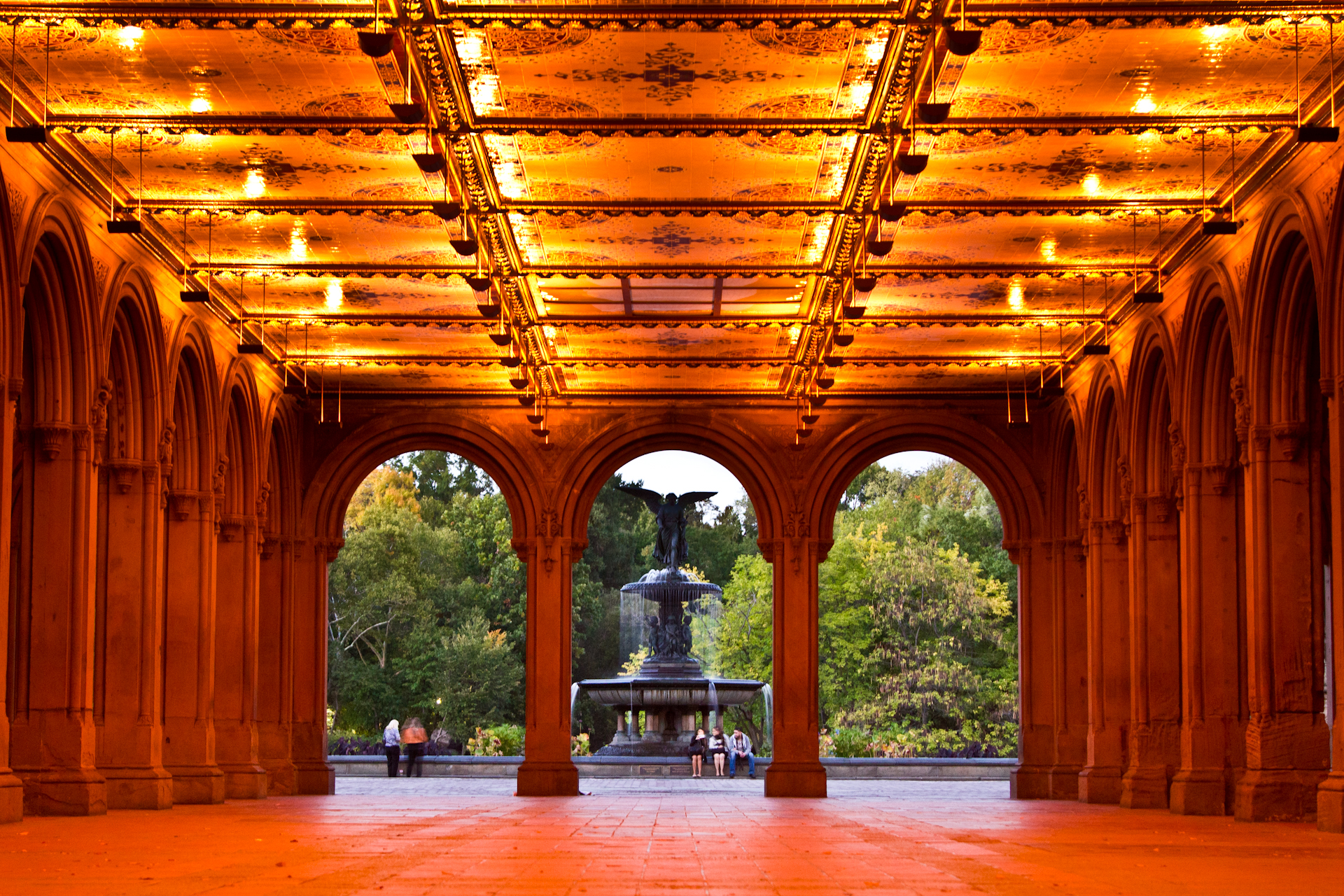
Lower Passage

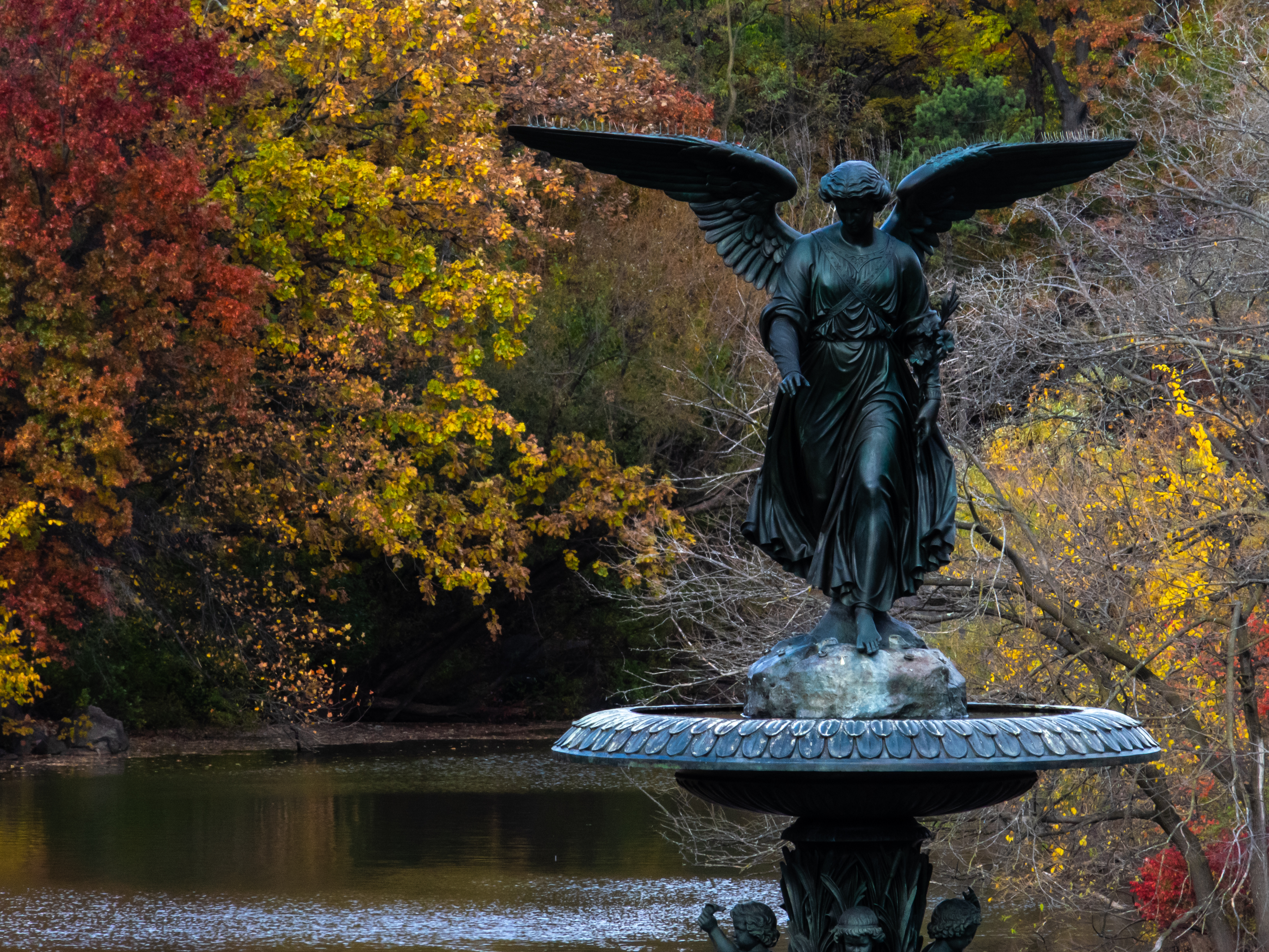
Angel of the Waters (1873) by Emma Stebbins

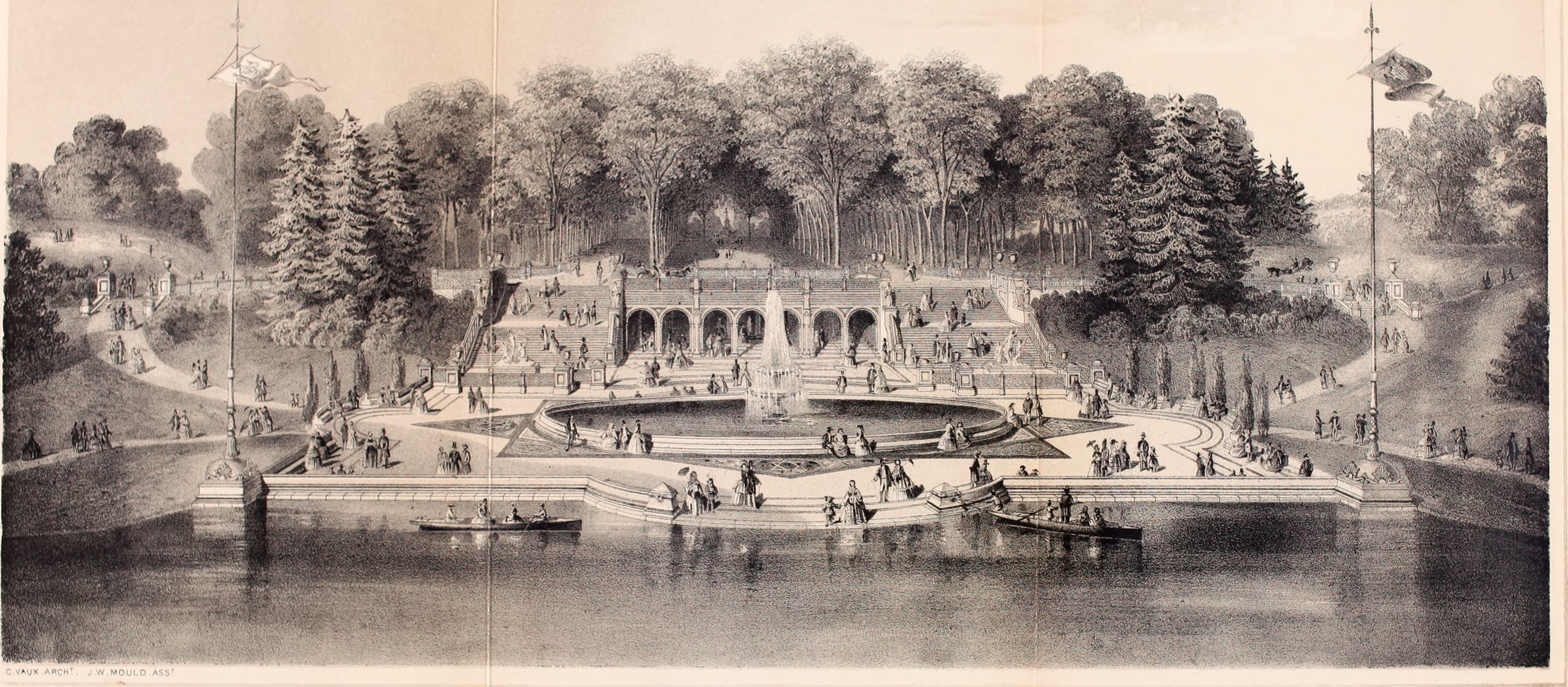
1858 rendering

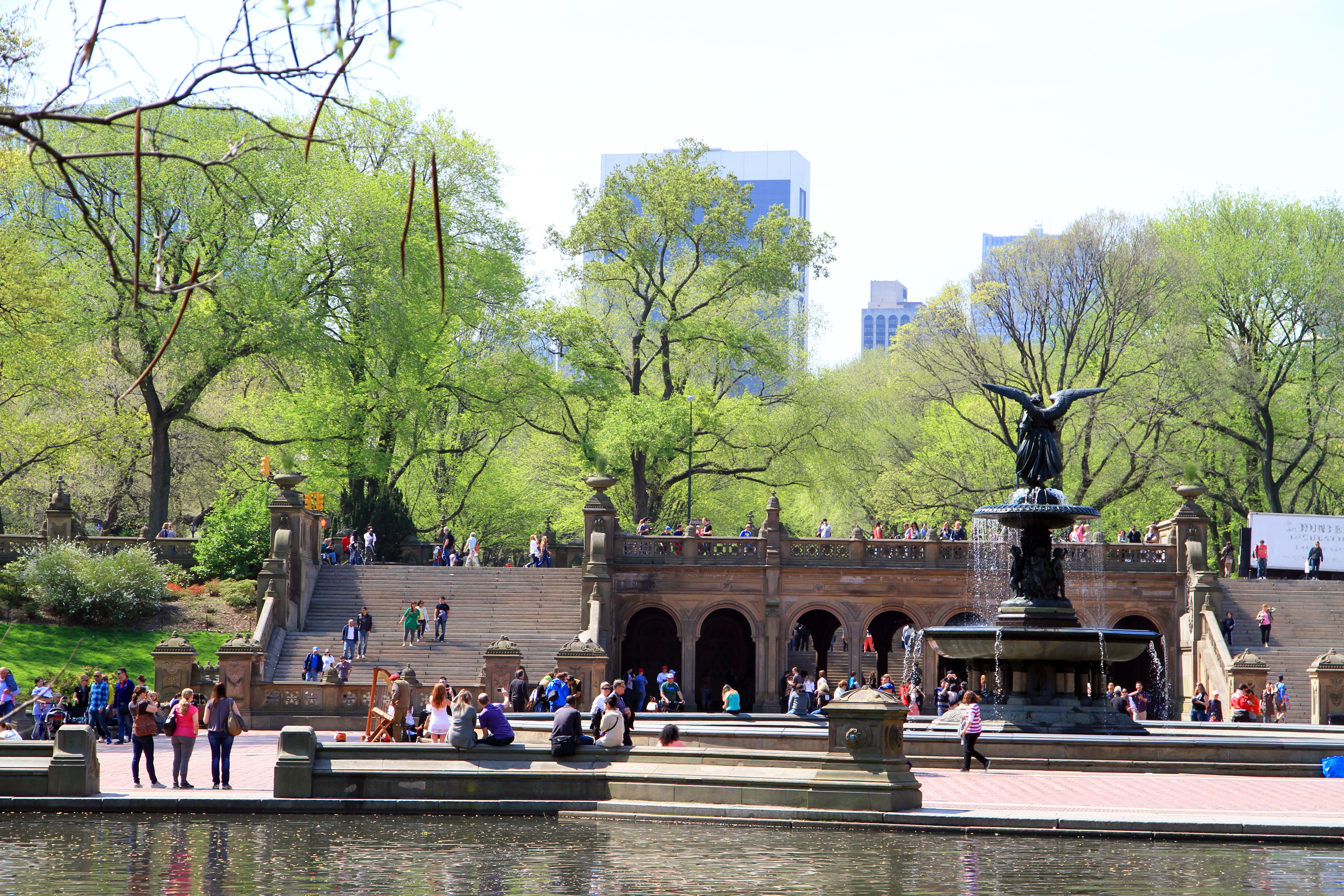
Central Park- Bethesda Fountain

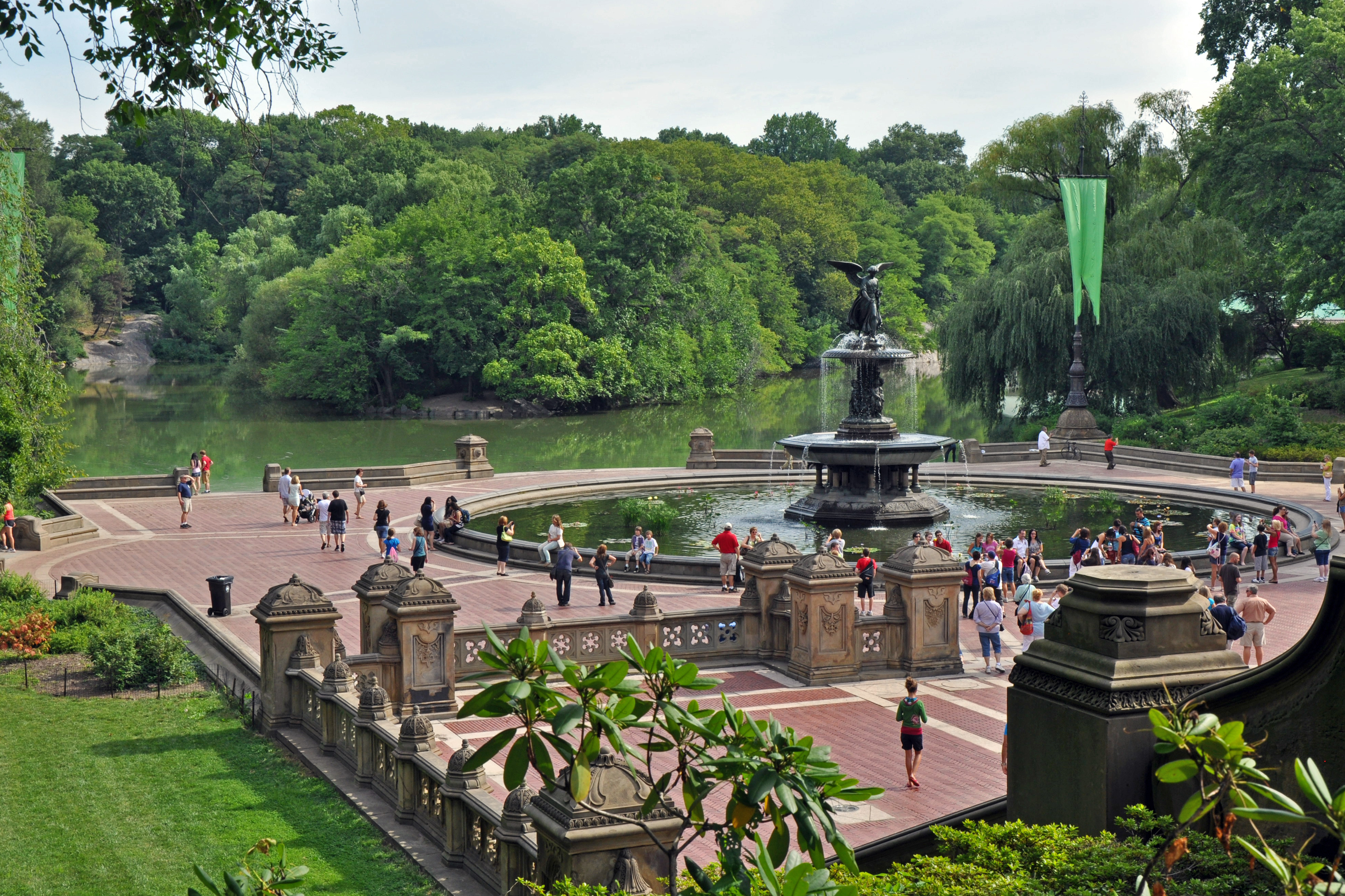
View of the fountain from the terrace

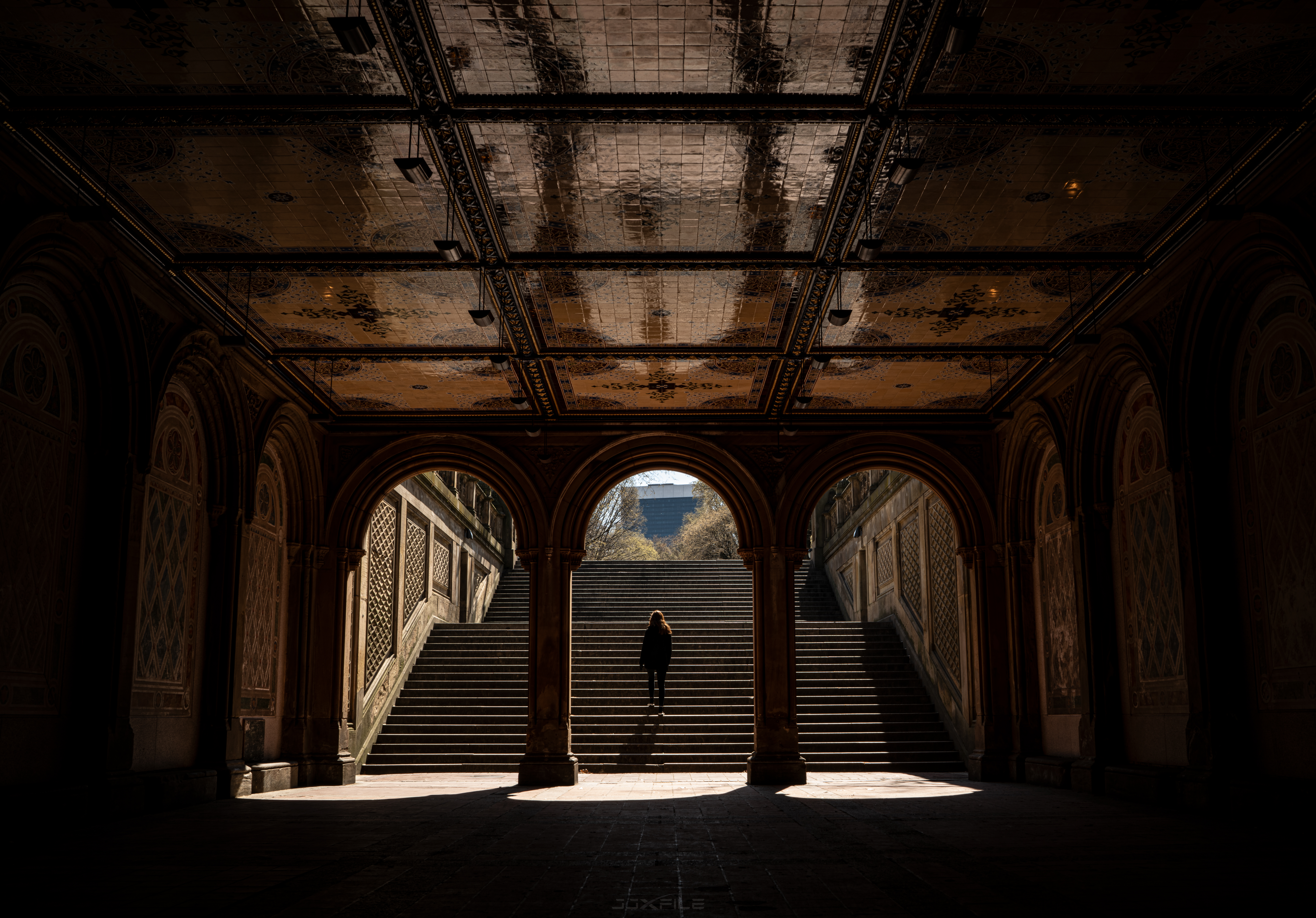
During the COVID-19 pandemic in New York City

== See also ==
- History of fountains in the United States
