= 20 West 16th Street =

House in Manhattan, New York

- House at 20 West 16th St. Emma Stebbins House
- U.S. National Register of Historic Places
- New York State Register of Historic Places
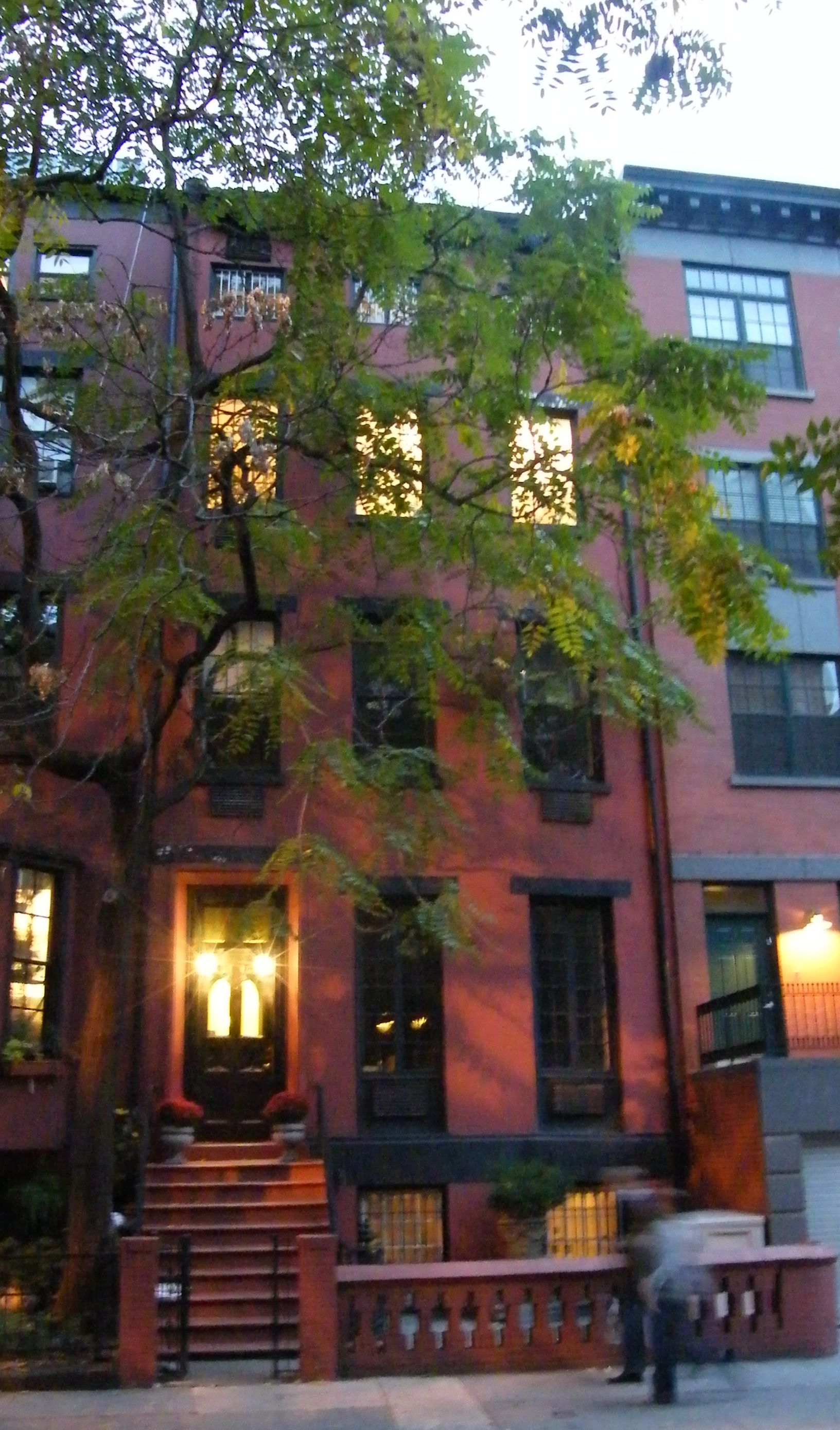

- Location within Manhattan Location within New York City Location within New York Location within the United States
- Location: 20 W. 16th St., New York, New York
- Coordinates: 40°44′15″N 73°59′40″W
- Area: less than one acre
- Architect: Isaac Greene Pearson
- Architectural style: Gothic Revival
- NRHP reference No.: 07000484
- NYSRHP No.: 06101.016023

Significant dates
- Added to NRHP: 2007-05-30
- Designated NYSRHP: 2007-04-09

20 West 16th Street is a house in the Chelsea neighborhood of Manhattan in New York City, New York, US. Designed in the Gothic Revival style by Isaac Greene Pearson, it was constructed in 1844–1845 and owned by the family of artist Emma Stebbins for a half-century. It is one of Manhattan's few remaining intact Gothic Revival houses and is the only remaining building associated with Stebbins. Over the years, the house has remained in residential use, with residents such as the politician Bella Abzug. It is listed on the National Register of Historic Places.

The building is a three-bay-wide brick structure. It is set back from a concrete front yard, with three stories above a brick basement. Features of the facade include a stoop to the raised first floor, tall windows with sills, and a cornice with wooden arches. Inside the primary living space, there are a parlor, living room, and dining room on the first floor, and there are bedrooms on the second floor. A stair from the first floor rises to another apartment on the third and fourth floors.

== Description ==
20 West 16th Street is part of a set of five townhouses at 12–20 West 16th Street, on the south side of the street, flanked by the Thorne Mansion and St. Francis Xavier High School. With the expansion of the neighboring New York Hospital, the townhouses at number 12 and 14 were demolished in the early 20th century; number 16 was replaced with an apartment building by 1939, leaving numbers 18 and 20 as the only intact structures in Oliver's development. Across the street to the north are a group of houses at 5–9 and 17–23 West 16th Street (including the Margaret Sanger Clinic at number 17), which are all protected as New York City designated landmarks.

All five houses at 12–20 West 16th Street were built by Thomas Oliver. 20 West 16th Street was designed by Isaac Greene Pearson for Oliver's sister Emily. As built, it measures 21 by 55 feet (6.4 by 16.8 m) across, with the longer dimension extending north–south and the shorter dimension on the street frontage. The roofline is 55 feet (17 m) high, and there is a rear extension about 10 feet (3.0 m) deep at the house's southern end. The rear extension is two stories high and consists of space at the building's basement and first-floor levels. It is one of a few remaining Gothic Revival style houses in Manhattan; the style was not commonly used in the borough due to the small lot dimensions created when the Manhattan street grid was laid out.

=== Facade ===
The building is a three-bay-wide brick structure set back from a concrete front yard. It has a raised basement (placed just below ground level), with security grilles around the basement window. The main first-floor entrance is on the east (left) side of the building and is accessed by a brick stoop with an iron railing; the right-hand (west) railing wraps around a newel post at the bottom. The first-floor entrance door retains its original wooden panels with quatrefoil and trefoil motifs, which are topped by a pair of arch-shaped glass panels. Another entrance, to the basement, is located under this stoop.

The first to third floors have tall parlor windows, each with black frames and plain windowsills. They originally had label moldings in their lintels, which have since been removed. The shorter fourth-floor windows open inward and lack windowsills and lintels, although the windows on all stories are of equal width. Openings for air conditioning units exist beneath some windows. The facade is topped by a cornice with wooden arches, which project about 1 foot (0.30 m) from the front (northern) facade on 16th Street. The inner facades of the arches have trefoil (three-leafed) and quatrefoil (four-leafed) shapes. A similar cornice used to exist in the adjacent building at 18 West 16th Street but has since been removed.

=== Interior ===
Under the first floor, the eastern side of the raised basement has a hallway, while the rest of the basement has a space extending from front to rear. There are two restrooms in the basement, one each near the middle and at the southeast corner.

The primary living space is on the first and second floors. The main entrance, from the north leads to a Gothic-style vestibule with decorations such as trefoil arches, quatrefoil panels, and an elaborate plaster medallion with shell motifs. A door to the south, decorated with trefoil decorations and arched windows, leads to a hallway on the building's eastern side, along with a wooden staircase leading directly to the third and fourth stories. West of this hallway are the first-floor parlor suite (which includes the parlor room, dining room, and kitchen) to the north, along with an office and restroom to the south. The layout of these rooms has not changed significantly since construction, and the spaces themselves retain their original wood floors, plaster walls and ceilings, and decorative moldings. The parlor room has pocket doors to the dining room, an ornamented full-height mirror to the north, and a fireplace to the west. The dining room has a stair to the second floor on its eastern wall.

The second floor, used as a sleeping quarters, is reached from the dining-room stairs and retains many of its original decorations. There are two bedrooms (one each in the front and rear), which have their original sash windows, wood-paneled pocket doors, moldings, and floors. The rear bedroom to the south retains its original marble fireplace, along with French doors leading to an outdoor deck above the two-story rear extension. The front (north) bedroom is separated from the rear bedroom by two restrooms and is connected to it by a hallway on the eastern end. The third and fourth floors are arranged as a single duplex apartment and are accessed directly from the stair from the first-floor hallway; this stair has entrances to both levels of the duplex. At the front of the house, a spiral staircase also connects the third and fourth floors internally. The third floor has a living–dining room in the front (with an arched marble fireplace), a restroom and kitchen in the middle, and a bedroom in the rear. The fourth floor was historically used for servant housing and consists of three bedrooms, a hallway with closets, and a restroom.

== History ==
20 West 16th Street and the neighboring sites had been owned since 1825 by the Cowman family. In 1844, the family sold several lots to Thomas S. Gibbes and George B. Butler, real-estate agents for the Baltimore businessman Thomas Oliver, who constructed five townhouses there in the Gothic Revival style. 20 West 16th Street, the westernmost house in that group, was sold for $2,500 (equivalent to $86,400 in 2025) to a trust owned by Oliver's sister, Emily Oliver Gibbes. The house, designed by Pearson, cost $6,009 (equivalent to $207,600 in 2025) and was designed by Pearson. Othercontractors involved in the building's construction included the iron supplier J. Althouse, the plumber Nathaniel Sawyer, the mason Samuel McCorkle, and the carpenter John Sniffen.

Gibbes's trust rented out the house, initially to the bookseller Oliver Prescott Woodford, who moved into the house in 1845 shortly after its completion. Woodford bought the house in 1847 and sold it seven years later to William A. Stebbins, whose siblings included the artist Emma Stebbins and the politician Henry G. Stebbins. The Stebbins siblings' mother, Mary, subsequently moved in. Emma Stebbins resided in the building for several years in the 1850s, and for six years before she died in 1882. The Stebbinses retained the building for half a century and rented parts of it out, including to the dentist Robert S. Moore in the 1860s. In 1889, the rear extension was rebuilt as a steel-and-iron structure. By the 1900s, Celestino Piva, a member of the Italian Benevolent Institute and a silk salesman, lived at the building.

The Stebbins family sold the house in 1907 to their neighbors, the Tallent family. The building was split up into a single-room occupancy and resold in 1927 to a labor union who used it as a dormitory. In 1954, a group of artists acquired 20 West 16th Street, planning to use the first floor for exhibits and the upper floors as sleeping quarters. It subsequently hosted exhibitions of the Terrain Gallery. The house was sold in 1962 to Helena Simkhovitch, and the politician Bella Abzug (later to become a U.S. congresswoman) lived there during the same decade. In 1968, it was resold to the family of journalist Isabel Logan Lyon in 1968. The house is the only extant structure associated with Emma Stebbins. It was listed on the National Register of Historic Places on May 30, 2007.

== See also ==
- National Register of Historic Places in Manhattan from 14th to 59th Streets

== Sources ==
- Lockwood, Charles (2003). Bricks and brownstone : the New York row house, 1783-1929. New York: Rizzoli. ISBN 978-0-8478-2522-6.
- National Register of Historic Places Inventory/Nomination: House at 20 West 16th St (PDF) (Report). National Park Service. May 30, 2007. With accompanying pictures
