= Emma Stebbins =

American artist (1815–1882)

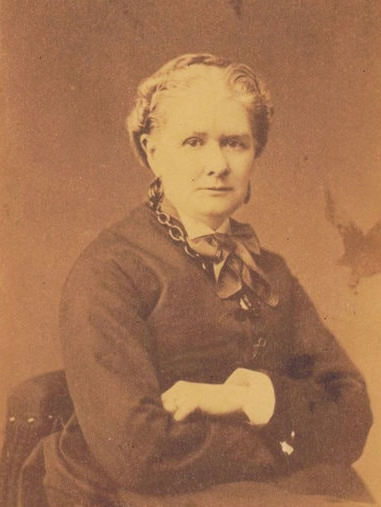
- Born: September 1, 1815; New York City, U.S.
- Died: October 25, 1882 (aged 67); New York City, U.S.
- Burial place: Green-Wood Cemetery, Brooklyn, New York
- Partner(s): Charlotte Cushman (1857; her death, 1876)
- Relatives: Henry G. Stebbins (brother)

Emma Stebbins (September 1, 1815 – October 25, 1882) was an American sculptor and the first woman to receive a public art commission from New York City. She is best known for her work Angel of the Waters (1873), the centerpiece of the Bethesda Fountain, located on the Bethesda Terrace in Central Park.

== Biography ==
=== Early life ===
Stebbins was born on September 1, 1815, in New York City, one of nine children of John L. Stebbins, a wealthy banker, and his wife, Mary Largin. Her family encouraged her interest in the arts.

=== Life in Rome ===
In 1856, Stebbins' brother, Henry G. Stebbins, encouraged her to travel to Rome to pursue her interest in sculpting. That May, Stebbins, her younger sister Caroline, and their mother traveled to Rome, where Emma and Caroline settled. While Caroline married John Rollin Tilton, an American painter, in 1858, Emma was welcomed into a society of expatriates by Harriet Hosmer, also an American sculptor.

Hosmer introduced Stebbins to some of her future teachers including John Gibson and Paul Akers.

One of the leading ladies of the expatriates in Rome was Charlotte Cushman, an American actress. Upon meeting Stebbins, Cushman took a special interest in her work and earned a place in her affections. The pair quickly became a couple and within a year of meeting, the women exchanged unofficial vows and considered themselves married.

As she had done for others before, Cushman used her influence to help secure commissions for Stebbins. Stebbins and Cushman's romance strained their relationship with Hosmer, who had once been the object of Cushman's affections and influence.

In September 1857, Stebbins and Cushman returned to the States to recoup Cushman's savings, after her business manager embezzled funds. During Cushman's acting tour, Stebbins stayed with her family in New York. On July 6, Cushman gave her final performance and the couple sailed to England. Before returning to Rome in November 1858, the couple took a tour of the continent.

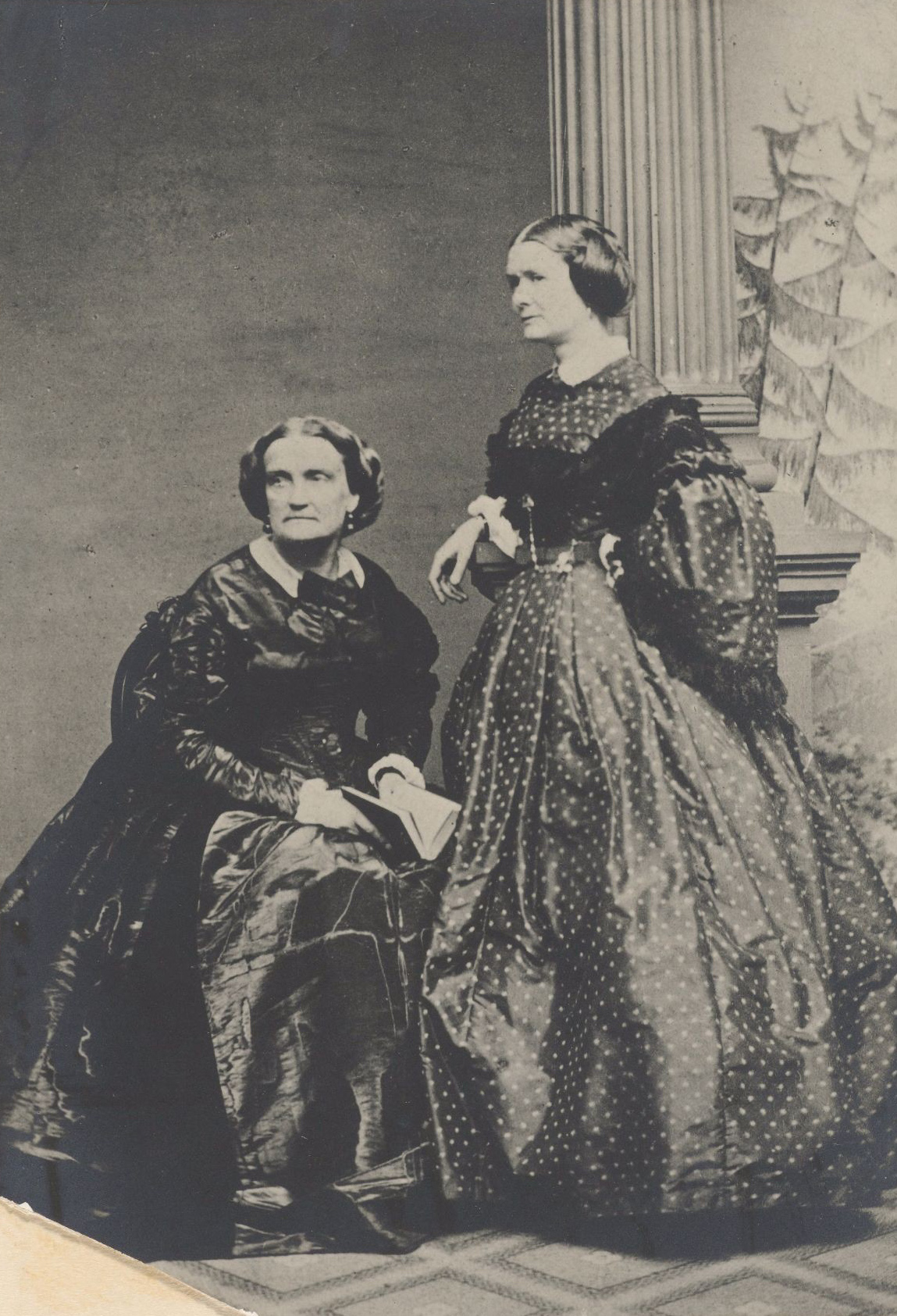
Charlotte Cushman and Emma Stebbins

=== Later years ===
Stebbins and Cushman lived together for 12 years before returning to the United States after Cushman was diagnosed with breast cancer. Stebbins had stopped working in order to care for Cushman, until her death in 1876.

Stebbins lived at 20 West 16th Street in New York City for the last six years of her life. Stebbins spent nearly the rest of her life writing Cushman's biography, Charlotte Cushman: Her Letters and Memories of Her Life, and died on October 25, 1882, from lung disease. She was buried in Green-Wood Cemetery in Brooklyn.

== Works ==
Stebbins was a neoclassical sculptor and made about two dozen small-scale marble statues and two public works in bronze. Unlike the majority of her peers, Stebbins enjoyed making smaller pieces and liked to do all of her carving herself.

In 1842, some of Stebbins' work was featured at the National Academy of Design in New York. She was also nominated to be an associate member of the group, which was open to amateurs. However, Stebbins' election was nullified after an unspecified breach in procedure. Her name was never resubmitted.

In 1847, Stebbins' submitted oil copies to be displayed at the Pennsylvania Academy of Fine Arts.

While Stebbins lived in Rome, she completed a number of statues including The Lotus Eater (1857–60), which was commissioned by British sculptor John Gibson, and Industry (1859) and Commerce (1859), which were both commissioned by Charles Heckscher. Industry and Commerce were both displayed at the Goupil & Cie gallery in New York in 1860.

In 1860, Stebbins also completed a bust of Cushman, her lifelong partner. Later in life, the bust was a popular request for replication.

In the 1860s, Stebbins completed The Treaty of Henry Hudson with the Indians (1860), Sandalphon (1861), Satan (1862), and Christopher Columbus (1867). Christopher Columbus was the only life-sized marble piece that Stebbins created.

=== Horace Mann (1865) ===
Towards the end of 1861, Stebbins had been commissioned to complete a bronze statue of Horace Mann. The piece was to be erected in front of the State House in Boston. Cushman, a native to Boston, had a special interest in the project and is thought to have used her connections to get Stebbins the commission.

=== Angel of the Waters (1873) ===
Stebbins is best known for Angel of the Waters, which sits atop Bethesda Fountain. Rumors of nepotism surrounded the project because Stebbins' brother was the chairman of Central Park's Committee on Statuary, Fountains and Architectural Structure. Many believe that he pressured the committee into giving his sister the commission.

Stebbins was inspired by the biblical story in which an angel gives the waters of Bethesda healing powers; it is in reference to the Croton Aqueduct, which brought fresh water to the city beginning in 1842.

== Legacy ==
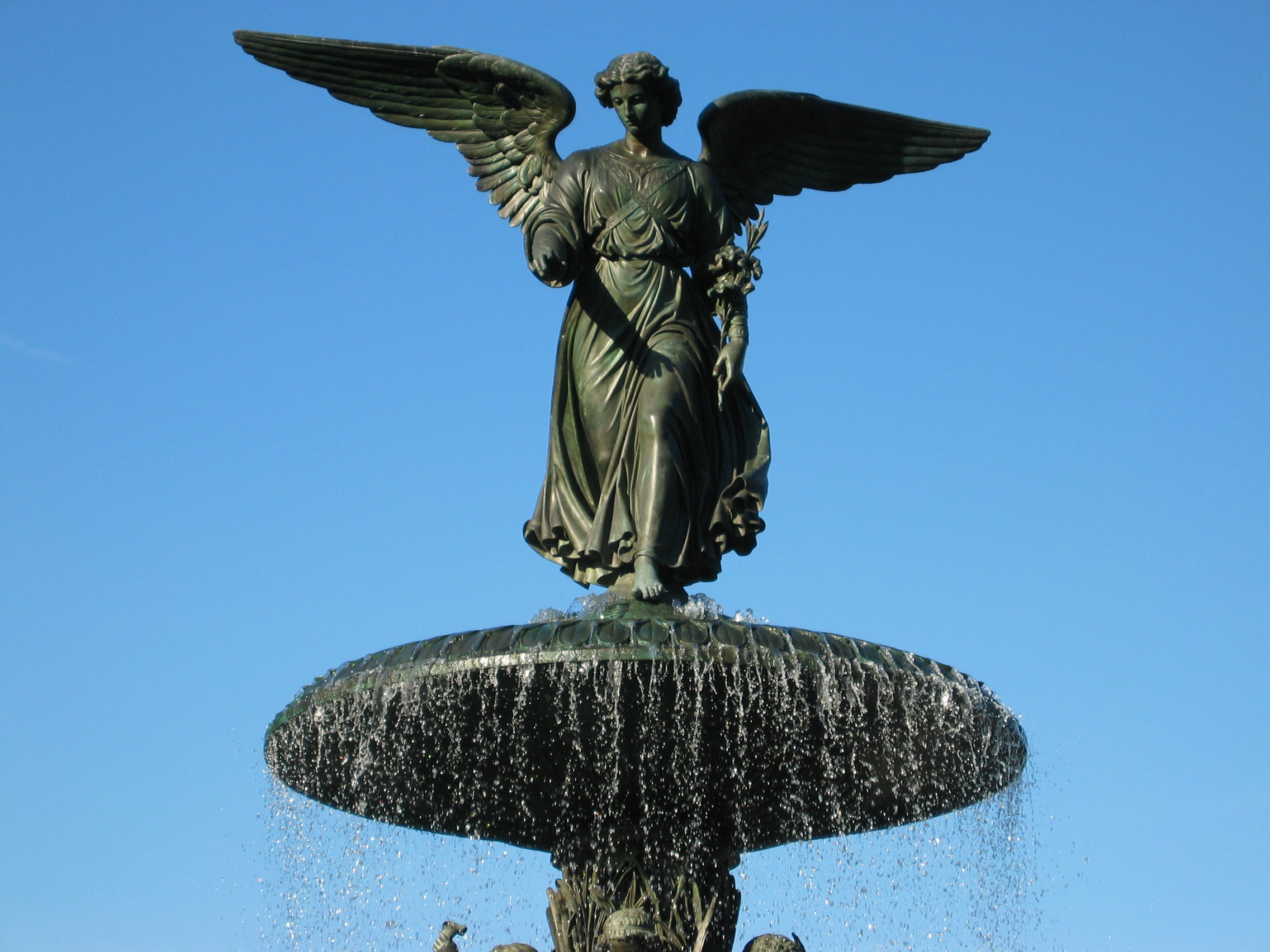
Angel of the Waters (1873)

Much of what we know about Stebbins comes from her sister, Mary Stebbins Garland. After Stebbins' death, Garland documented her sister's work in a scrapbook and wrote an unpublished biography, Notes on the Art Life of Emma Stebbins. The scrapbook contained several photos of Stebbins' work in chronological order, as well as pictures of Stebbins and those who had encouraged her, such as Cushman and Stebbins' brother Henry.

Angel of the Waters has been featured in many New York movies, such as Angels In America, Home Alone 2, Elf and Enchanted.

In June 2019, The New York Times wrote an obituary for Stebbins as part of their Overlooked series. Stebbins' obituary was added as a member of the LGBTQ community. In September 2022 Neri Pozza published in Italy the first biography of Emma Stebbins: "Emma e l'Angelo di Central Park," written by Maria Teresa Cometto. In June 2023 Bordighera Press published the English edition: "Emma and the Angel of Central Park."

From September 28, 2025 – March 15, 2026, the Heckscher Museum of Art displays Emma Stebbins: Carving Out History; an exhibition of "fourteen sculptures, the exhibition features archival material including photographs that document lost marble sculptures and plaster studies that Stebbins never realized in stone or bronze." The exhibit was curated by Karli Wurzelbacher, who also wrote the exhibition catalog (ISBN 979-8-992-51621-0). This exhibition moves to the Driehaus Museum from October 9, 2026 - April 18, 2027.

== Gallery ==
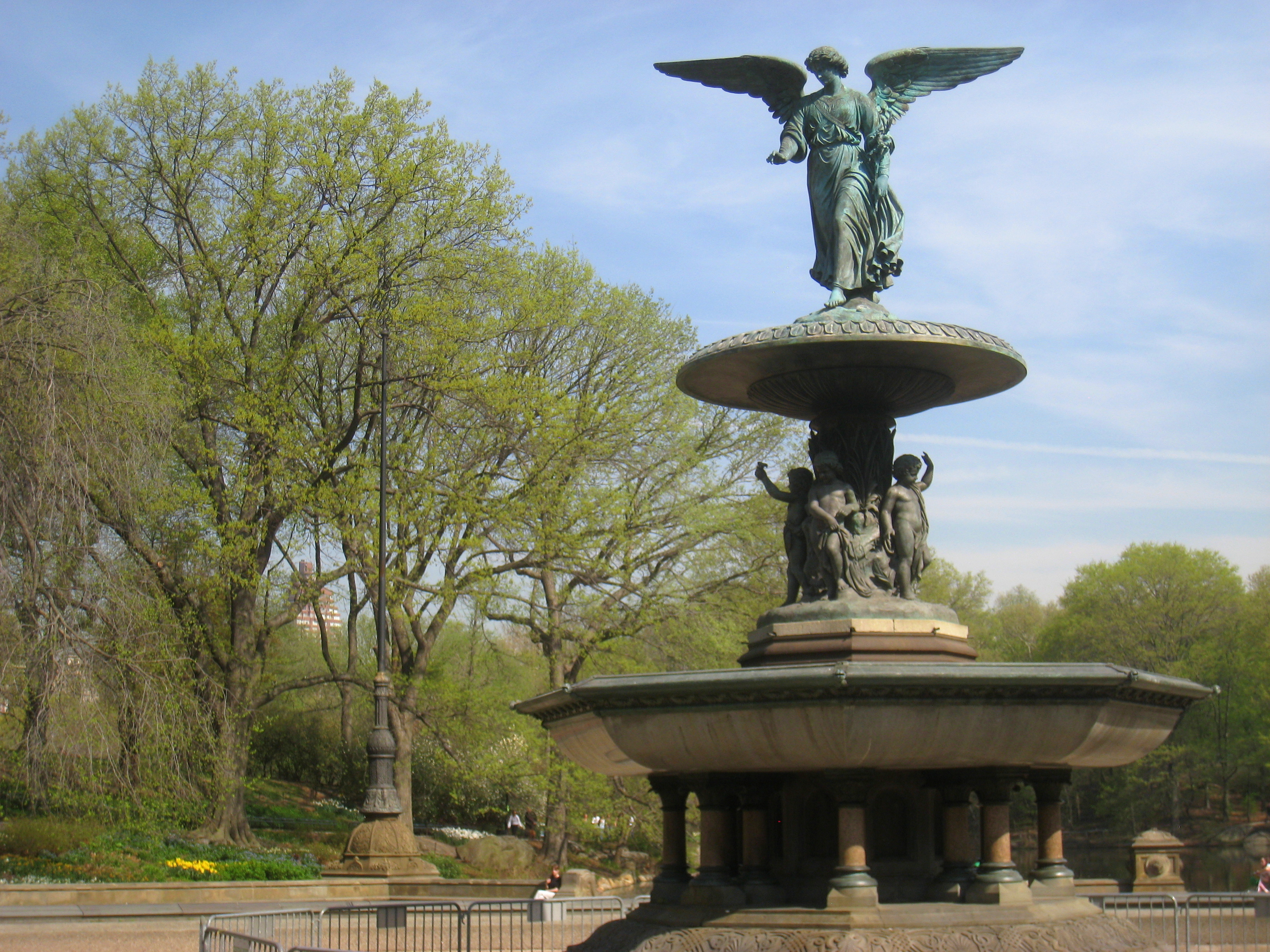
Angel of the Waters (1873) in Central Park.

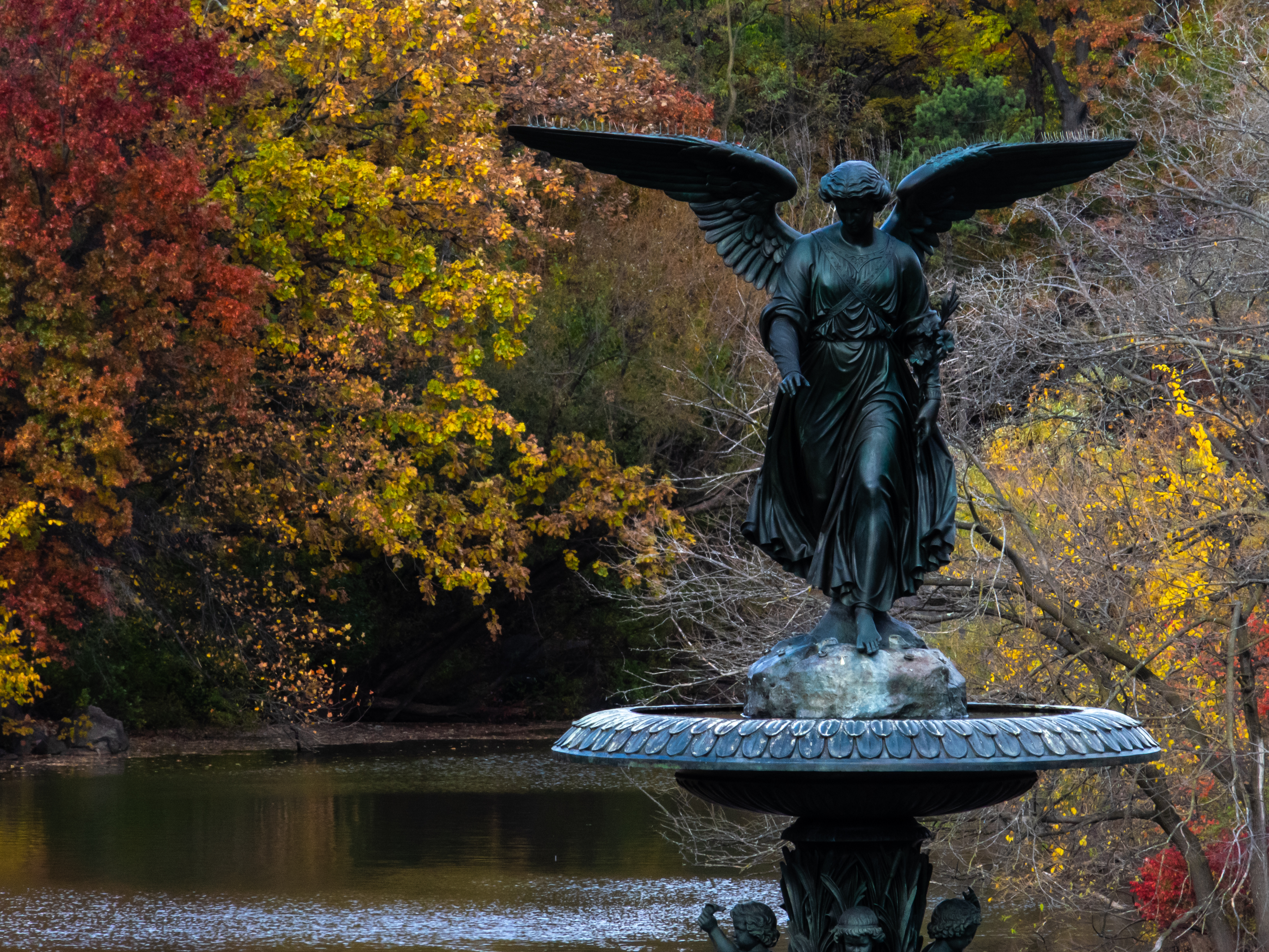
Angel of the Waters (1873) in autumn.

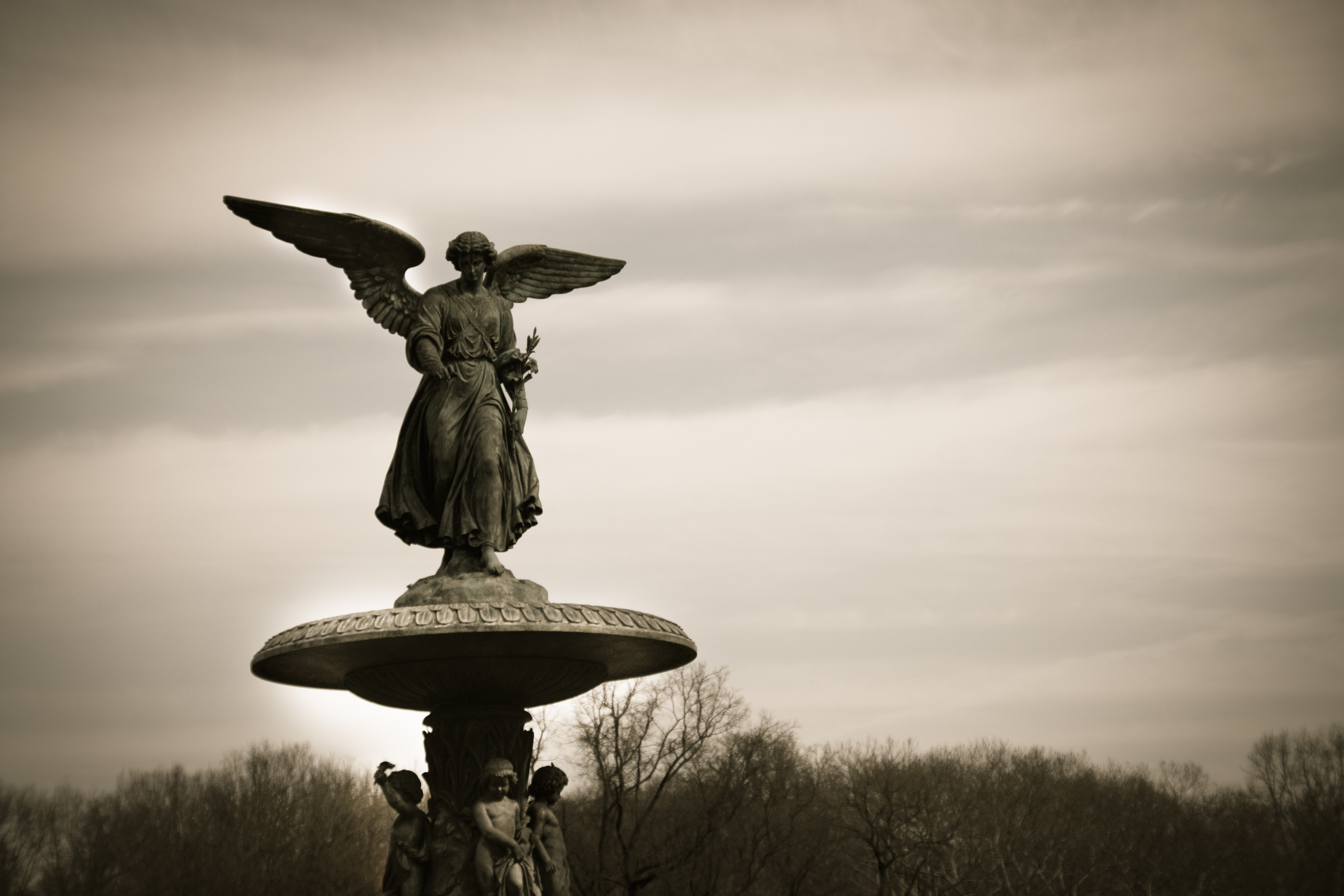
Angel of the Waters at Bethesda Fountain

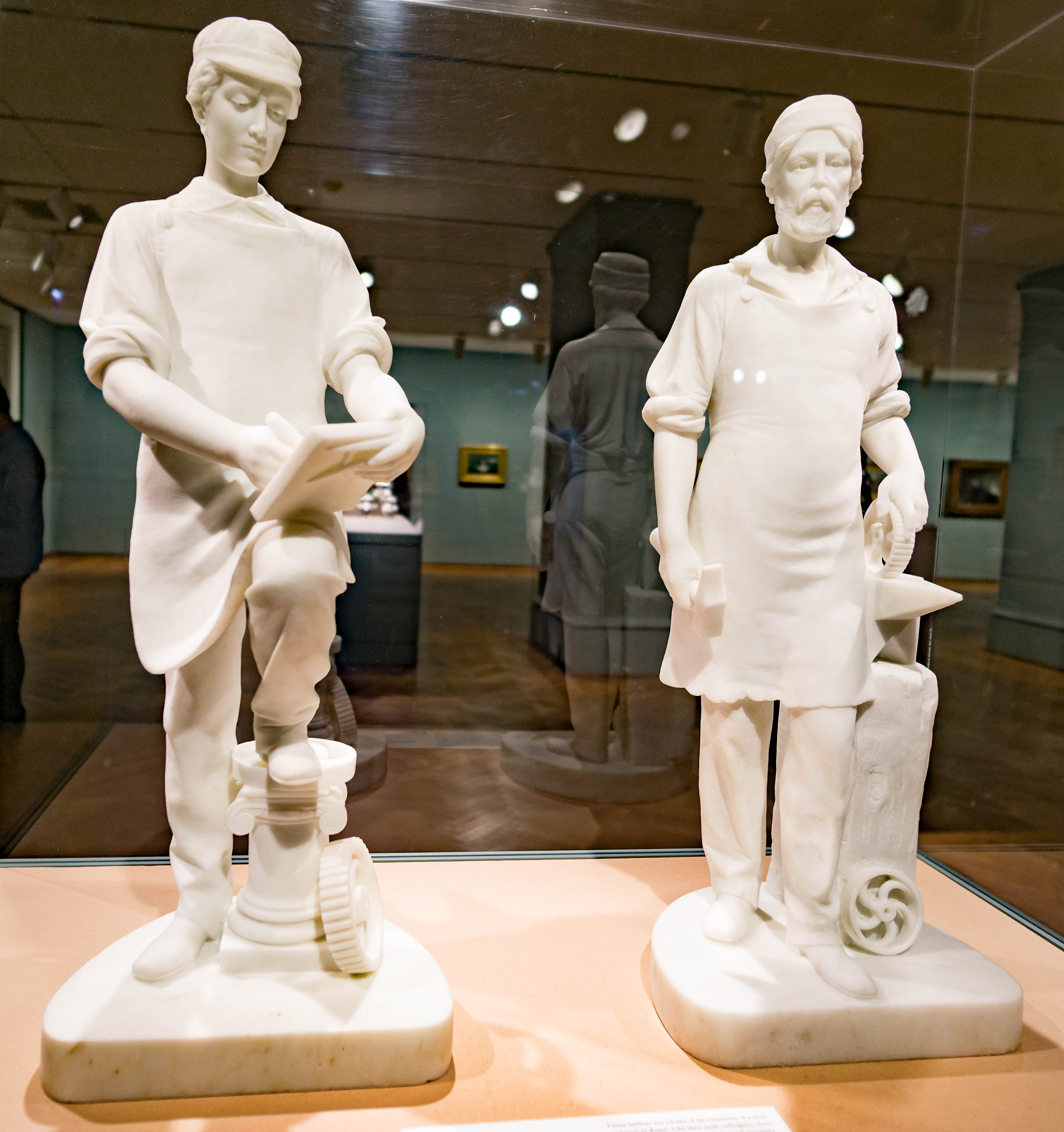
Industry (1859) and Commerce (1859)

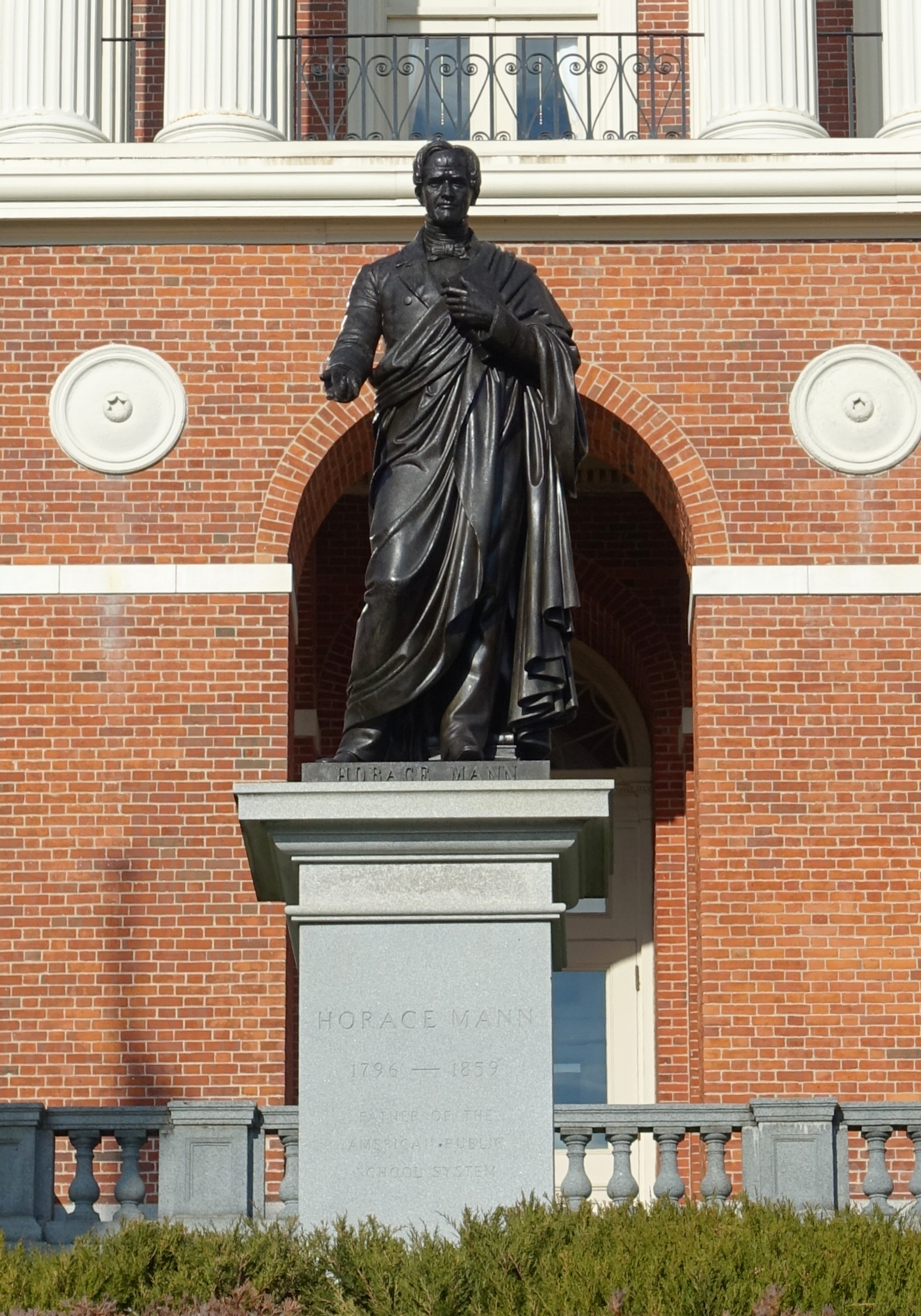
The Horace Mann (1865) statue outside the Massachusetts State House.

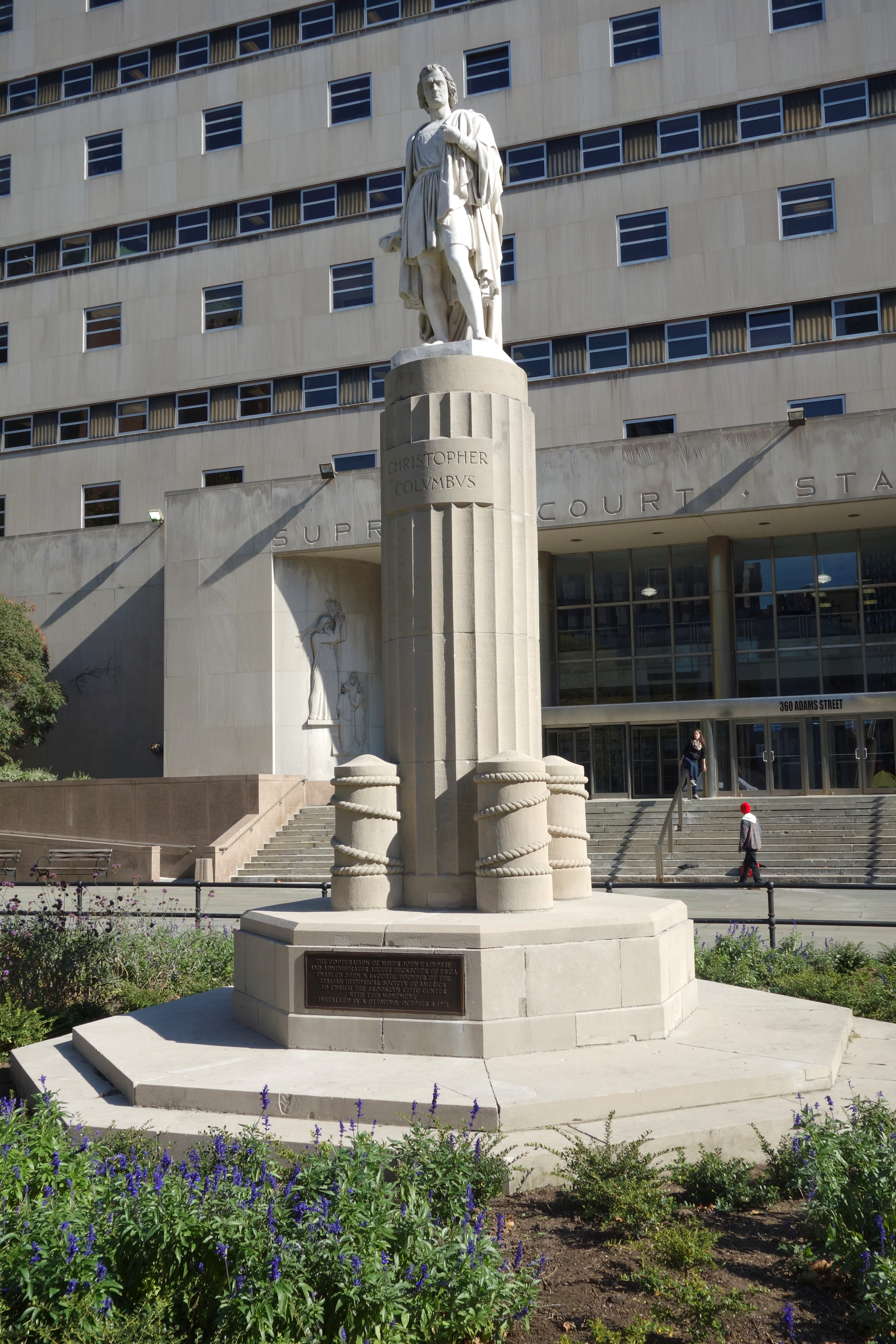
Christopher Columbus (1867)

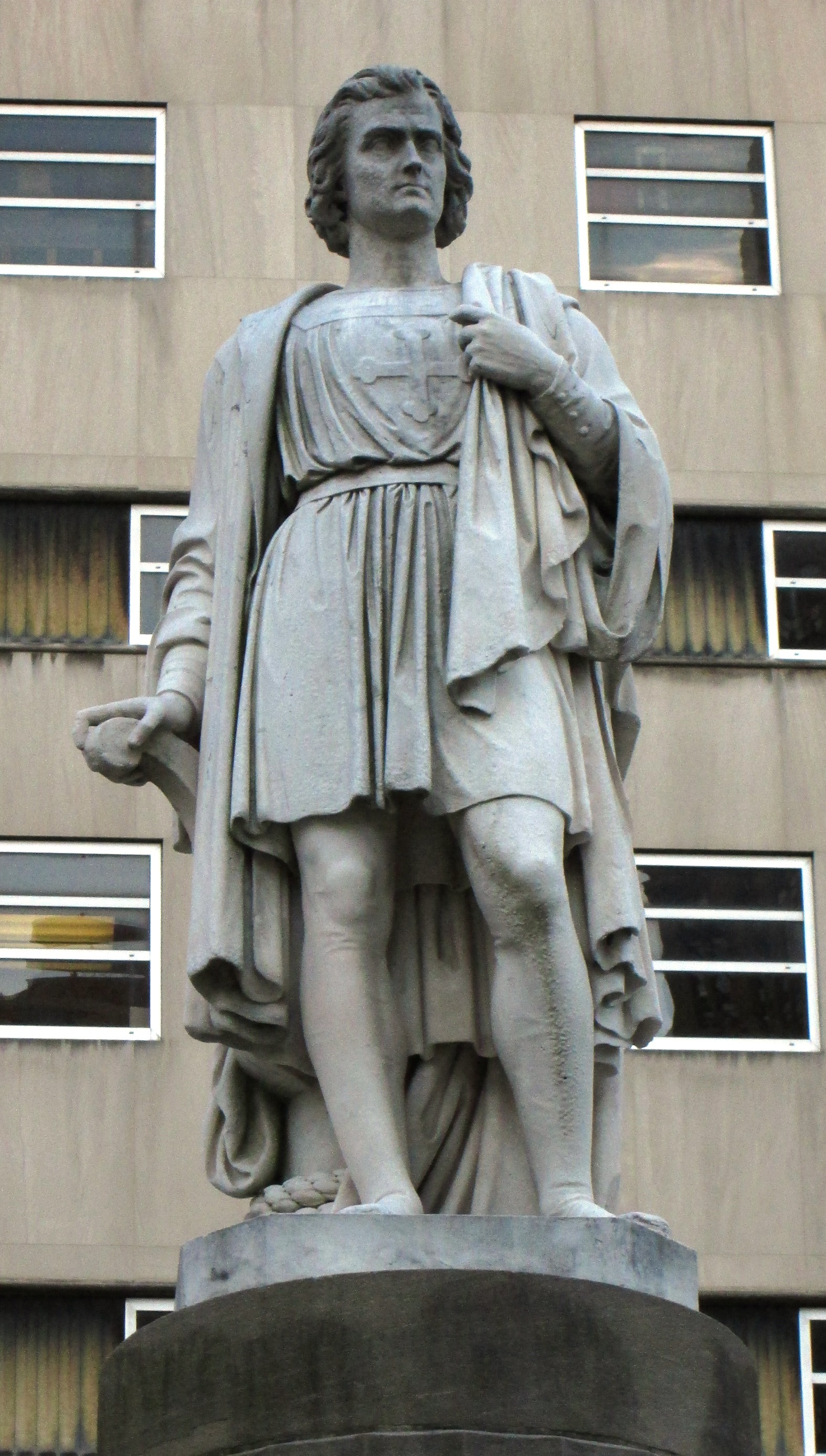
Christopher Columbus (1867)
