= Clinical Research Bureau =

Historic birth control clinic in New York City, U.S. (1930–73)

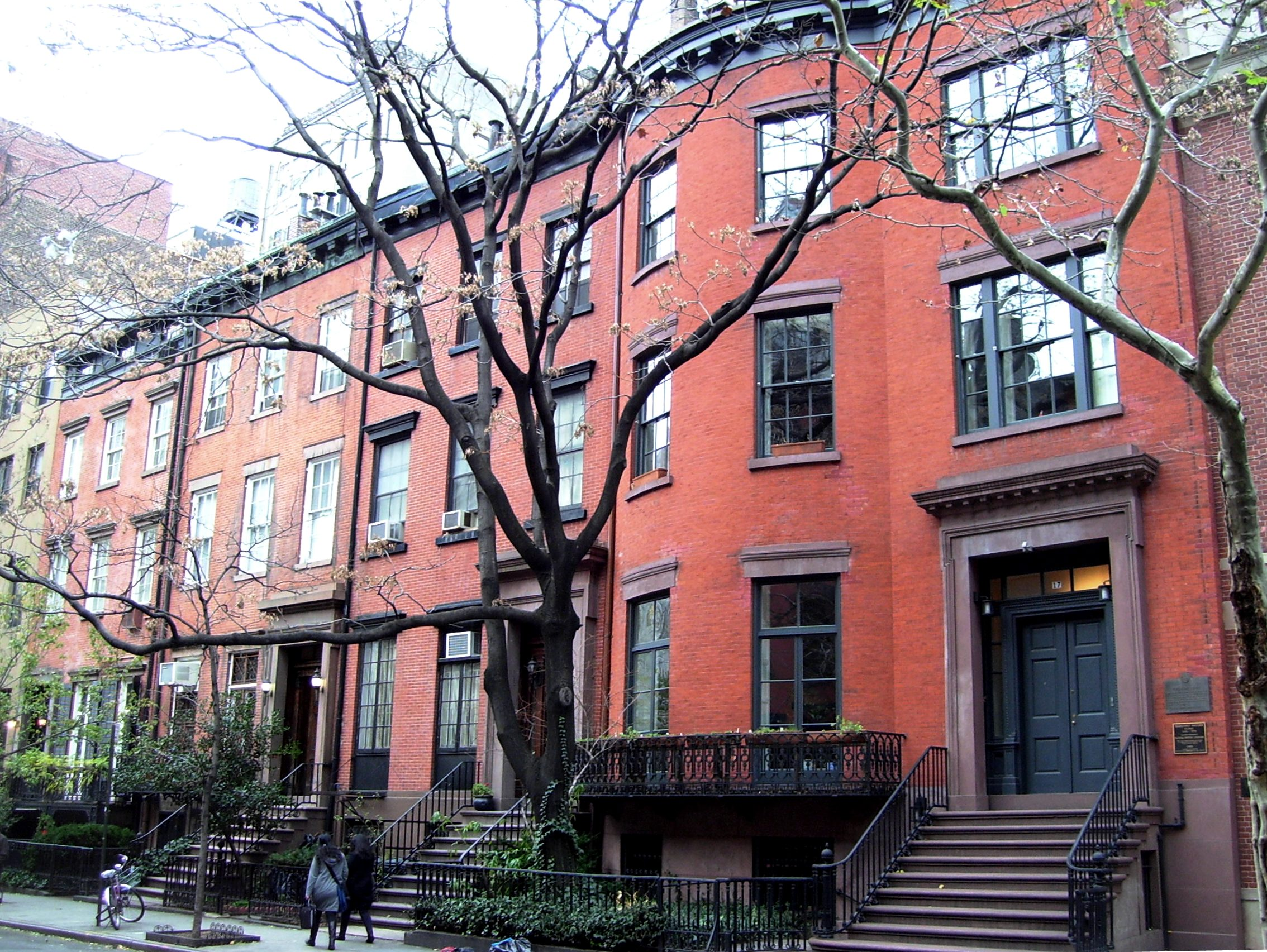
The Clinical Research Bureau operated from this New York building from 1930 to 1973.

The Clinical Research Bureau was the first legal birth control clinic in the United States, and quickly grew into the leading contraceptive research center in the world. The CRB operated under numerous names and parent organizations from 1923 to 1974, providing birth control and infertility clinical services to thousands of patients, and serving as a site for medical research and education on these topics.

== Founding ==
Founded by Margaret Sanger, the CRB opened in 1923 in New York City and operated under the direction of the American Birth Control League (ABCL). In 1928, Sanger resigned as president of the ABCL and assumed full control of the clinic, renaming it the Birth Control Clinical Research Bureau (BCCRB). The BCCRB and the ABCL merged in 1939 and became the Birth Control Federation of America (it became Planned Parenthood Federation of America (PPFA) in 1942 with the clinic retaining much of its independence). In 1940, it was renamed the Margaret Sanger Research Bureau in honor of its founder.

== Personnel and services ==
In 1925, Sanger hired Hannah Mayer Stone as the Medical Director of the CRB. After Hannah Stone's death in 1941, Abraham Stone, her husband and successor, altered and expanded the MSRB to accommodate his growing interest in infertility. In 1945, Stone inaugurated a Fertility Service that offered counseling, testing, and treatment for infertile couples. He expanded the Bureau's Marriage Consultation Service and steered the Research Department into a greater emphasis on infertility studies. While the Bureau continued to offer contraceptive services, the number of patients dropped as contraception became more widely available through private physicians. However, the Bureau grew as a teaching center, offering seminars, research projects and clinical work for visiting doctors, nurses, and medical students. The Bureau also offered a fellowship program for gynecologists and obstetricians for intensive training in birth control techniques.

== Dissolution and merge with Planned Parenthood ==
Due to budget deficits, the Bureau shut down in 1974 and combined its staff with Planned Parenthood of New York.

== See also ==
- Birth control movement in the United States
- Margaret Sanger Clinic
