= Margaret Sanger Clinic =

- Margaret Sanger Clinic; House at 17 West 16th Street
- U.S. National Register of Historic Places
- U.S. National Historic Landmark
- New York State Register of Historic Places
- New York City Landmark
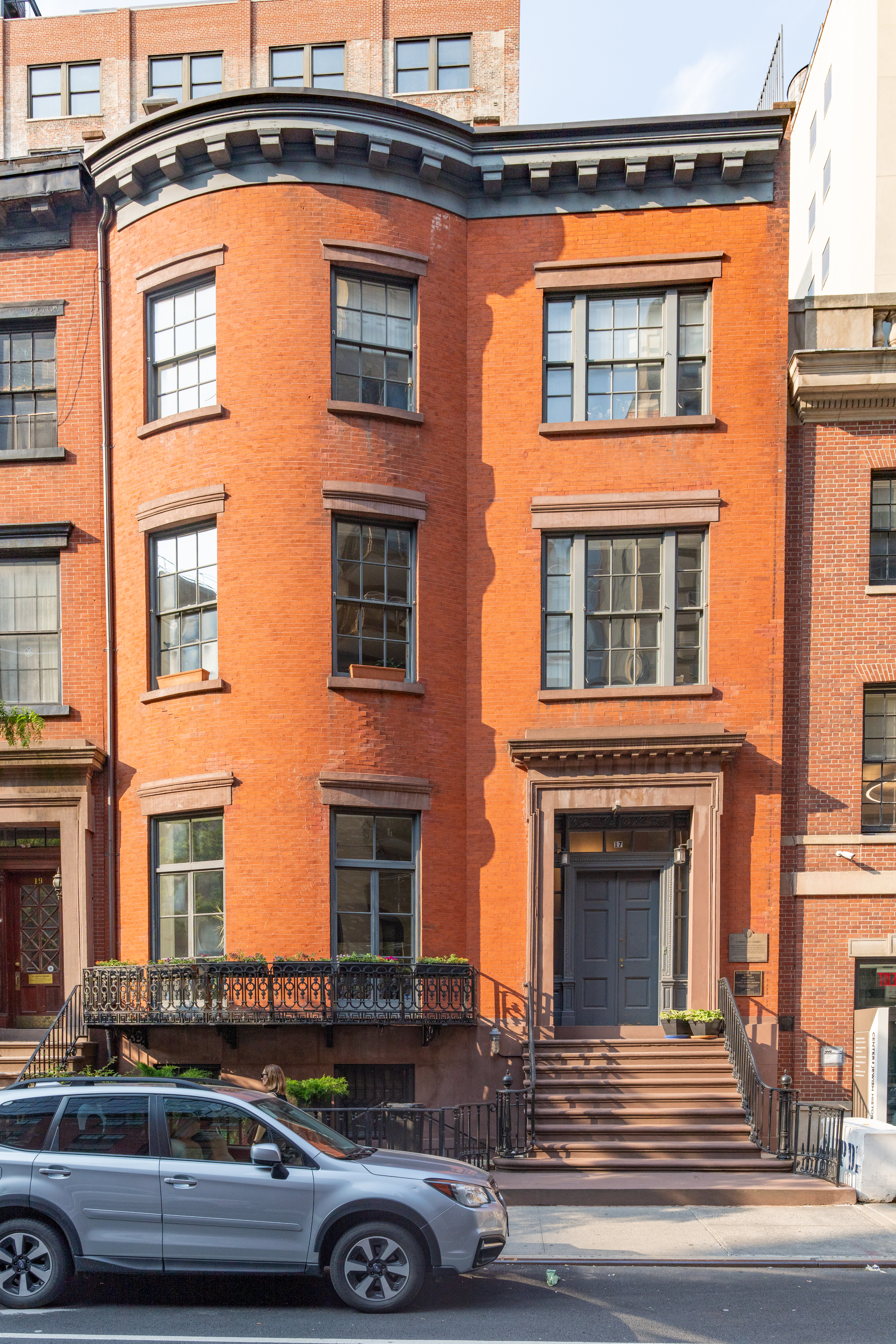
- (2025)

- Location within New York City Location within New York Location within the United States
- Location: 17 W. 16th St., New York, New York
- Coordinates: 40°44′17″N 73°59′39″W
- Area: less than one acre
- Built: 1846
- Architect: Edward Mesier
- Architectural style: Greek Revival
- NRHP reference No.: 83001730; 93001599 (National Historic Landmark designation)
- NYSRHP No.: 06101.001703
- NYCL No.: 0939

Significant dates
- Added to NRHP: May 26, 1983
- Designated NHL: September 14, 1993
- Designated NYSRHP: April 8, 1983
- Designated NYCL: November 9, 1976

The Margaret Sanger Clinic is a historic building at 17 West 16th Street in Manhattan, New York City. Built in 1846, it is notable as the location of the Clinical Research Bureau, where birth control pioneer Margaret Sanger and her successors provided contraceptive services and conducted research from 1930 to 1973. The building was designated a New York City Landmark in 1976 for its Greek Revival architecture, and was declared a National Historic Landmark in 1993 for its association with Sanger.

== Description and history ==
The former Margaret Sanger Clinic site is located between Manhattan's Chelsea neighborhood and Union Square, on the north side of West 16th Street between Fifth and Sixth Avenues. It is part of a series of Greek Revival rowhouses on the street's north side. 20 West 16th Street is across the street.

It is a 3 1/2-story brick structure, with a two-bay facade and dormered gable roof. The left bay is a locally rare example of a rounded projecting bay, with two sash windows on each level that have brownstone sills and lintels. The main entrance is in the right bay, recessed under a brownstone surround with a projecting modillioned cornice. The interior of the building retains many original Greek Revival features, including fireplace surrounds, marble floors, and a winding main staircase.

The house was built about 1846 to a design by Edward Mesier. Margaret Sanger opened her first birth control clinic, the Clinical Research Bureau, in 1916, in a building on Amboy Street in Brooklyn that is no longer standing. It was next quartered in rented rooms on West 15th Street, and purchased this building in 1930 as its first permanent home. Sanger and her clinic were instrumental in fundamentally altering how Americans talked about sex, venereal diseases, and contraception. The clinic housed in this building had the space not just to educate women on these matters, but also to provide education to medical professionals that was not widely taught in medical schools at the time.

The building is now privately owned. It became a New York City designated landmark in 1976.

== See also ==
- Birth control movement in the United States
- List of National Historic Landmarks in New York City
- List of New York City Designated Landmarks in Manhattan from 14th to 59th Streets
- National Register of Historic Places listings in Manhattan from 14th to 59th Streets
