= Donovan Benson =

British banker and chairman of the Royal Hong Kong Jockey Club (1896–1972)

- Born: 21 January 1896; London, United Kingdom
- Died: 17 November 1972 (aged 76); British Hong Kong
- Other name: 賓臣
- Occupation: Banker

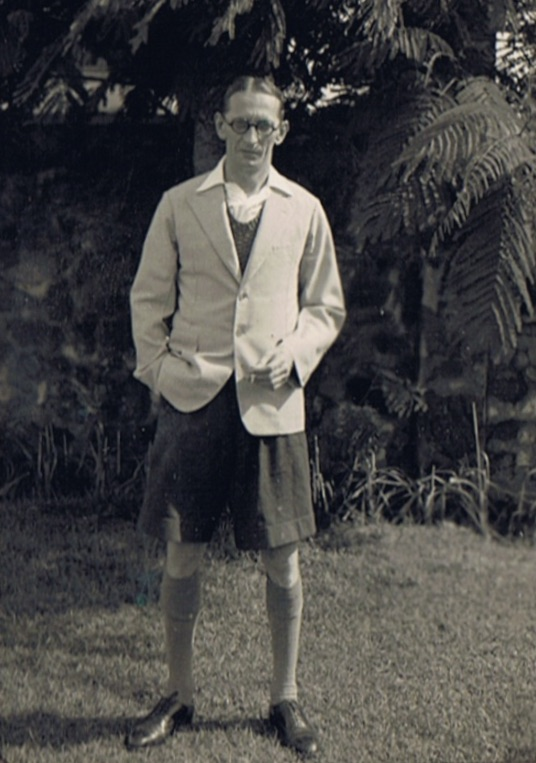
Donovan Benson c.1930

Donovan Benson OBE JP (Chinese: 賓臣; 21 January 1896—November 17, 1972) was a British colonial banker. From February 1937 to July 1952, he served as manager of the Mercantile Bank of India in Hong Kong. After retiring from banking, he served as chairman of the Royal Hong Kong Jockey Club from March 1953 to September 1967.

Benson joined the Mercantile Bank of India in 1919 and worked for 17 years in Malaya, Singapore and Penang before being transferred to Hong Kong as manager in February 1937. During his tenure, he lived through the Second World War. Although he was outside Hong Kong when the territory fell to Japanese forces in December 1941, he returned immediately after the British reoccupation in 1945 to reorganise the bank's operations. After the war, he planned the reconstruction of the bank's head office in Hong Kong, but the new building was not completed and opened until December 1953, after his retirement. During his time as manager, he was also appointed a non-official Justice of the Peace and twice served temporarily as an unofficial member of the Executive Council of Hong Kong.

After leaving the Mercantile Bank, Benson chose to make Hong Kong his home. In addition to holding chairmanships and directorships in various commercial organisations, he was active in public service, with a particular focus on child welfare. This included serving as a magistrate of the Hong Kong Juvenile Court from 1953 to 1964, where he often showed special leniency towards children from poor families who had committed offences. He also served as president of the Hong Kong Playground Association, a member of the executive committee of the Hong Kong Society for the Protection of Children, and was involved in the work of the Hong Kong Juvenile Placement Association and the Hong Kong Scouts Association. Benson had participated in the founding of the Hong Kong Anti-Tuberculosis Association as early as 1940, serving as its honorary treasurer. After the war, he became a director in 1948, vice-chairman of the board in 1949, and chairman in 1963, retiring from that position in June 1964. While serving with the association, he regularly visited the children's ward at the Ruttonjee Hospital on Sundays to see children suffering from respiratory diseases.

A keen enthusiast of horse racing and polo, Benson served as chairman of the Hong Kong Jockey Club for 14 years. During his term, he strongly promoted the club's charitable work, not only securing multiple donations but also establishing the Hong Kong Jockey Club (Charities) Limited in 1959 to systematise the club's donation programmes. In recognition of the club's charitable activities, the British Crown granted it the "Royal" prefix in 1960, elevating it to the Royal Hong Kong Jockey Club. At the same time, Benson's tenure witnessed the increasing popularisation of horse racing betting. Although the club's only racecourse at Happy Valley Racecourse was frequently full on race days, plans to expand the grandstand and build a new racecourse were only realised after he left office. On the other hand, despite the problem of illegal off-course betting, the Hong Kong Government rejected the club's proposal to open off-course betting centres, while Benson himself opposed the professionalisation of amateur racing. Both proposals were only implemented after he stepped down as chairman. During his term, three jockeys (Samarcq, Neel, and 何炜航) died in riding accidents at Happy Valley, each causing a sensation in racing circles.

== Early life ==
Benson was born on 21 January 1896 in Hornsey, Middlesex (later part of the London Borough of Haringey), London. His father, William Tyler Benson, was a branch manager of the London and Provincial Bank. His mother was May Gertrude Gwyn. He was the second of four brothers. His eldest brother, William Roy Gwyn Benson (1895–1916), worked at the Standard Bank of South Africa and the Bank of Montreal before enlisting in the South Staffordshire Regiment at the outbreak of the First World War. He was killed in action at Vimy, France, in July 1916 at the age of 21 and is buried at the Cabaret-Rouge British Cemetery, Souchez.

His third brother, Wilfred Benson (1899–1963), graduated from Jesus College, Cambridge, and worked for the International Labour Organization and the United Nations. In 1942, he was the first to use the term "underdevelopment" to describe backward countries. His youngest brother, Gwyn Benson (1904–1977), also graduated from Jesus College, Cambridge, and later emigrated to Canada, where he worked in chemical research and the chemical industry in Shawinigan Falls.

Benson attended Hackney Downs School in London with his elder brother. While at school, he took a military signalling course in 1909. When the First World War broke out in 1914, he enlisted as a private in B Squadron of the Westminster Dragoons. He initially served in Egypt before being transferred in 1915 to the Gallipoli peninsula to take part in the Battle of Gallipoli. He was wounded when a bullet passed through several layers of sandbags and struck him in the jaw. He was evacuated to Exeter, England, on 9 September and underwent surgery on 27 September. After recovering in Honiton, he was commissioned as a second lieutenant in the South Staffordshire Regiment in 1916 (the same regiment in which his elder brother had served) and later served in France and elsewhere until the end of the war in 1918.

=== Mercantile Bank of India ===
After the war, Benson joined the Mercantile Bank of India in 1919. The bank had an extensive network in India and British Malaya. He was first posted to the Singapore branch, starting from the bottom. In 1920 he was transferred to Kuala Lumpur in the Federated Malay States, and in 1922 to Kelantan in the Unfederated Malay States. Apart from a short period on secondment to New York, he worked mainly in Malaya, Penang and Singapore. He later became manager of the Penang branch. In June 1935, he was appointed an unofficial Justice of the Peace for Penang in the King's Birthday Honours. After 17 years with the bank, Benson was appointed to succeed Robert Kennedy as manager of the Hong Kong branch and took up the post in February 1937. In May 1938, he was appointed an unofficial Justice of the Peace in Hong Kong.

Although the Mercantile Bank's main business was concentrated in India and Malaya, it had opened a branch in Hong Kong as early as 1857, making it the second bank to do so in the territory. Before the Second World War, it was one of the three note-issuing banks in Hong Kong, and Benson signed banknotes on behalf of the bank during his tenure. However, the circulation of Mercantile Bank notes was much smaller than that of the Hongkong and Shanghai Banking Corporation and Chartered Bank.

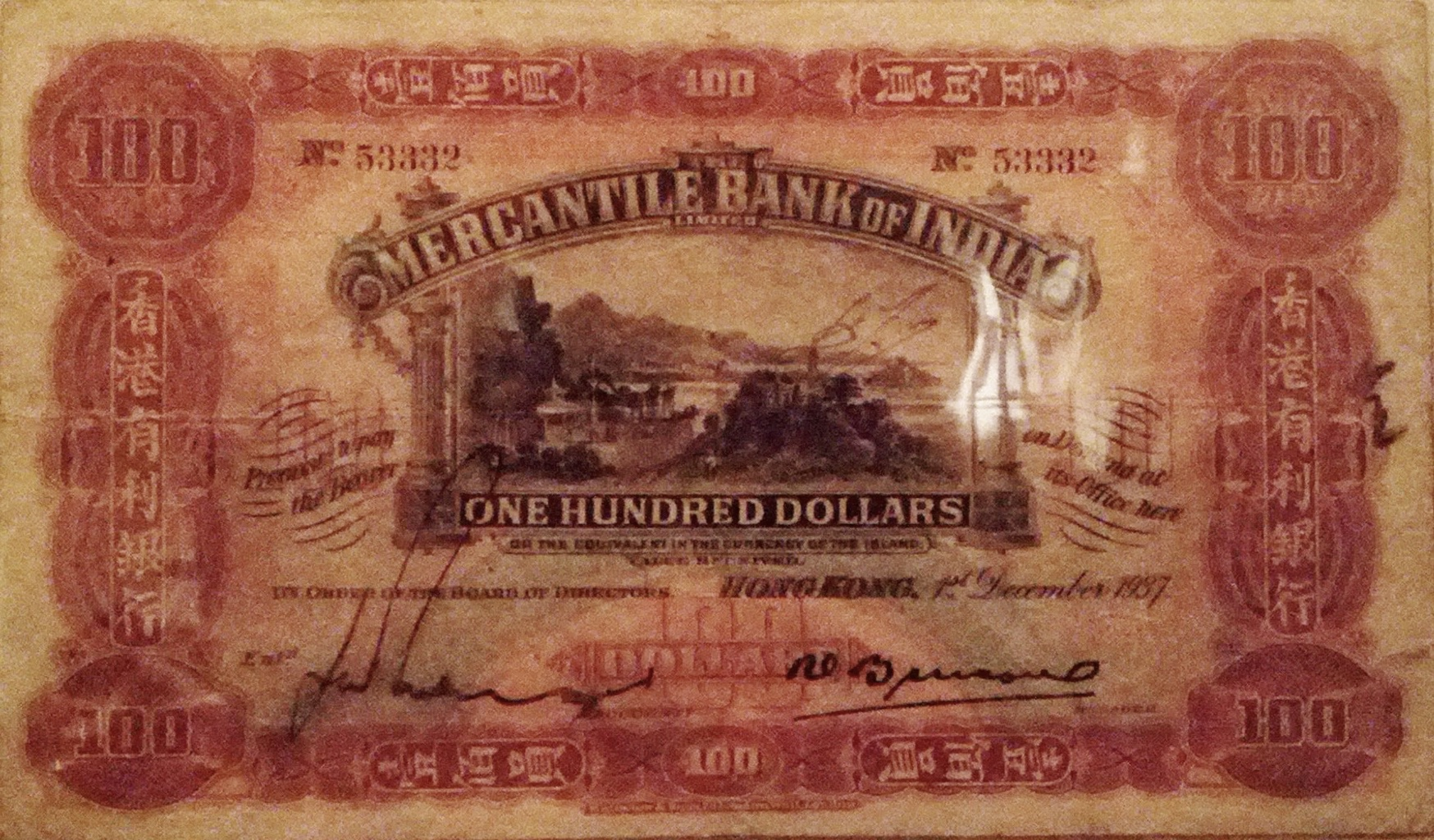
A 100-dollar note issued by the Mercantile Bank of India in Hong Kong in 1937, signed by manager Donovan Benson (signature at bottom right)

In December 1941, Japan invaded Hong Kong and the Battle of Hong Kong began. The territory fell on 25 December, marking the start of three years and eight months of Japanese occupation, during which banking operations were suspended. Benson was outside Hong Kong when Japanese forces advanced, so he was not interned after the fall. During the occupation, he remained in Australia and elsewhere. After Japan's unconditional surrender and the British reoccupation of Hong Kong in August 1945, he returned within three weeks. Mine-clearing operations were still underway on the route back. The bank's head office at 7 Queen's Road Central had been occupied by Mitsui & Co. during the Japanese occupation and was only recovered after reoccupation. Fortunately, all pre-war records and securities were found intact, enabling Benson to resume operations immediately upon his return in October 1945.

In the immediate post-war period, the bank faced multiple challenges. Severe shortages of goods led to heavy reliance on imports from the United States, causing a shortage of US dollars in circulation and creating difficulties for the bank. The problem gradually eased as local production recovered and new currency was issued. The bank introduced special measures to support its commercial and individual clients, including immediate overdraft facilities for major commercial clients. Other individual depositors who could prove they had held deposits before the war were allowed to overdraw up to 60% of their reported balance. These facilities did not apply to accounts involving questionable assets, especially those suspected of having been acquired through improper means during the war. The bank also faced staff shortages and recruitment difficulties. Although Benson wrote repeatedly to head office requesting additional staff from Britain, the response was slow, forcing him to scale back operations to some extent. As a result, the Mercantile Bank was unable to expand rapidly amid Hong Kong's post-war economic recovery.

Benson served as manager of the Mercantile Bank of India in Hong Kong for 15 years until his retirement in July 1952. He was succeeded by Alexander Godfrey Donn. After retirement, he chose to remain in Hong Kong. Before leaving, he planned the reconstruction of the Hong Kong head office. The old building, constructed during the First World War and over 30 years old, was demolished starting in August 1952. The new 10-storey head office building was completed and opened in December 1953, after his retirement. In the years after the Second World War, newly independent countries such as India and Pakistan introduced strict regulations and high tax rates that severely restricted the Mercantile Bank's traditional markets. This limited the bank's development. A few years after Benson's retirement, the bank was acquired by the Hongkong and Shanghai Banking Corporation in 1959, although the Hong Kong branch continued to issue notes until 1974 before gradually withdrawing from banking.

=== Public service ===
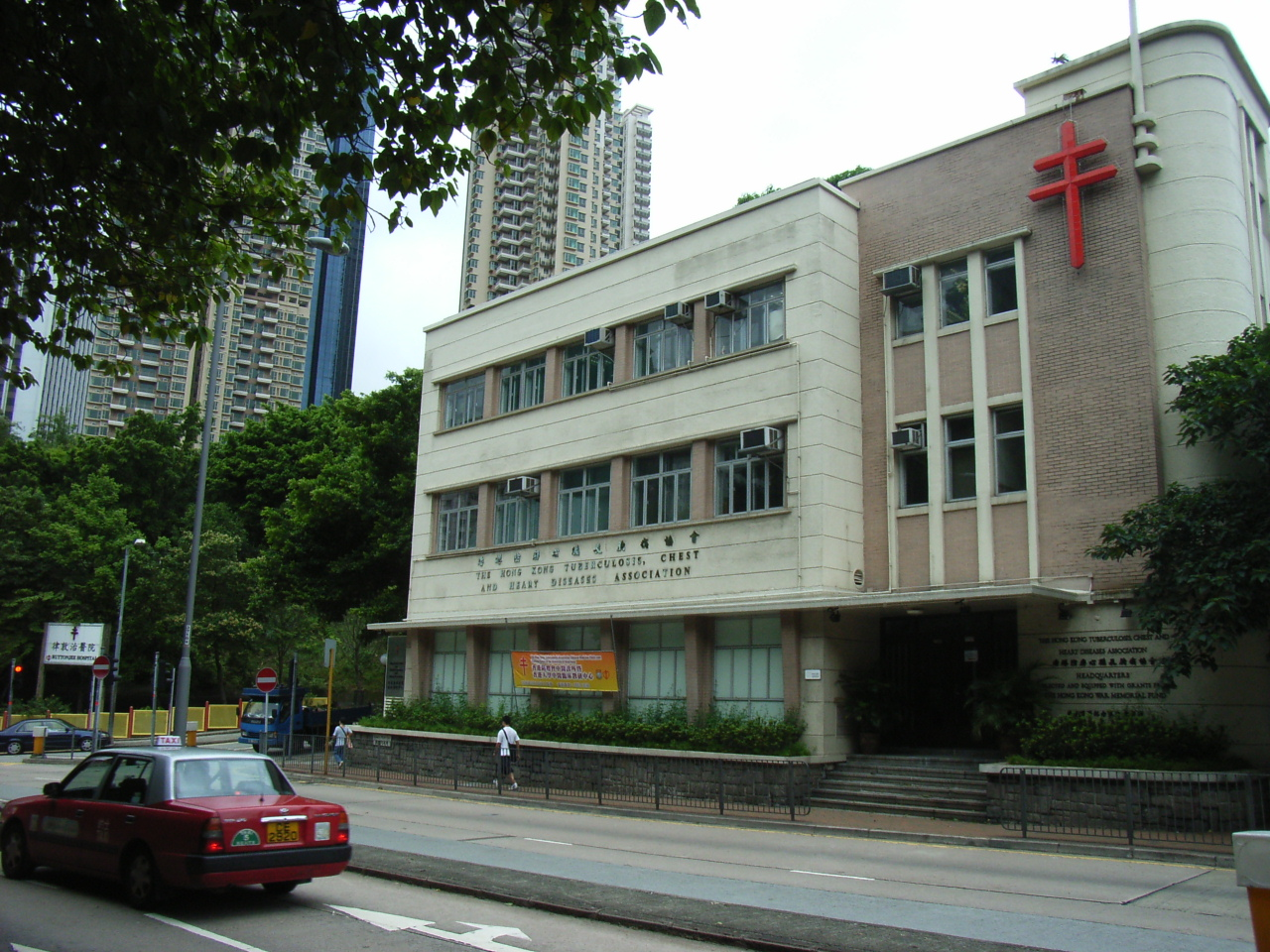
Benson helped found the Hong Kong Anti-Tuberculosis Association and served as its chairman from 1963 to 1964

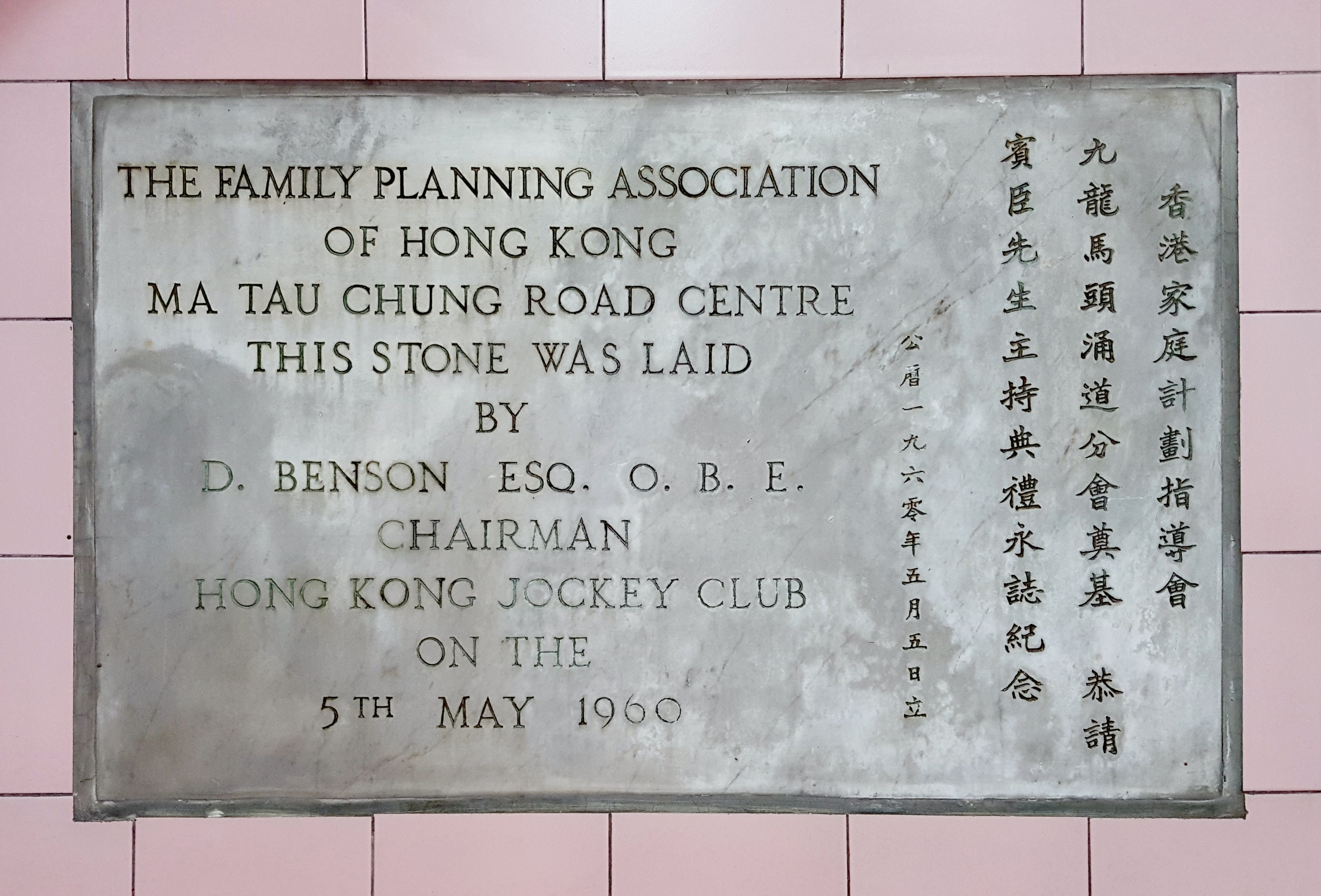
Benson laid the foundation stone for the Kowloon Ma Tau Chung branch of the Family Planning Association of Hong Kong on 5 May 1960

Before the war, Benson served as a member of the Hong Kong Exchange Fund Advisory Committee from November 1937 to November 1941 and as a member of the War Revenue Ordinance Review Committee from July 1940 to December 1941. After the war, he was appointed chairman of the Requisitioned Property and Allocation Committee, chairman of the Causeway Bay Reclamation Committee, and a member of the Education Committee. Between 1946 and 1953, he twice temporarily replaced Sir Arthur Morse as an unofficial member of the Executive Council while the latter was on leave. As a non-official Justice of the Peace, he also served as a magistrate in the Justices of the Peace Court. In March 1953, he was appointed a special magistrate. After retiring from the Mercantile Bank, his concern for child welfare led him to serve as a magistrate of the Hong Kong Juvenile's Court from 1953 to 1964, where he frequently showed special leniency towards children from poor families who had committed offences.

In addition to government appointments, Benson held important positions in many Hong Kong charitable organisations after the war. These included president of the Hong Kong Playground Association, a member of the executive committee of the Hong Kong Society for the Protection of Children, and chairman of the Voluntary Welfare Committee for the Services. He was also involved in the Hong Kong Juvenile Placement Association, the Hong Kong Society for the Prevention of Cruelty to Animals, and the Family Planning Association of Hong Kong. He served as a governor of Diocesan Girls' School and as president of the Hong Kong Scouts Association from 1959 to 1964. He was also active in the St. John Ambulance Brigade, serving as a council member and as chairman of the council from 1953 to 1954.

Benson took a particular interest in the problem of tuberculosis in Hong Kong. As early as February 1940, he helped found the Hong Kong Anti-Tuberculosis Association and was elected its honorary treasurer. Although the association's work was suspended during the Japanese occupation, he helped re-establish it after the war. In October 1948, together with Sir Chau Sik-nin, J. H. Ruttonjee, Ngan Shing-kwan, Shum Wai-yau and Lee Lu-cheung, he formally re-founded the association. He served as a director, became vice-chairman of the board in 1949, and chairman in 1963, retiring in June 1964. Over the years, he was actively involved in the association's work, making frequent radio appeals for donations and visiting the children's ward at Ruttonjee Hospital every Sunday to see children suffering from tuberculosis. In recognition of his public service, he was awarded the OBE in the 1952 Queen's Birthday Honours.

Benson's public service was not without minor controversies. In June 1956, on the recommendation of former Hong Kong Football Association president Kwok Chan, he was elected the new president of the association. However, the association was embroiled in controversy when executive committee member Chin Ning was accused of making remarks that allegedly offended the chairman of the Malayan Football Association, Tunku Abdul Rahman. Because reporters had been present when Chin made the remarks, they were widely reported, causing embarrassment to the association. Several executive committee members subsequently proposed banning reporters from attending future meetings, but the proposals were rejected on grounds that they infringed press freedom. Although Benson had not yet formally taken office and had not voted on the proposals, he had publicly expressed support for banning reporters. After the proposals were rejected twice, he announced in August 1956 that he would not take up the presidency. The position was eventually filled by Louey.

== Chairman of the Jockey Club ==
=== Charitable work ===
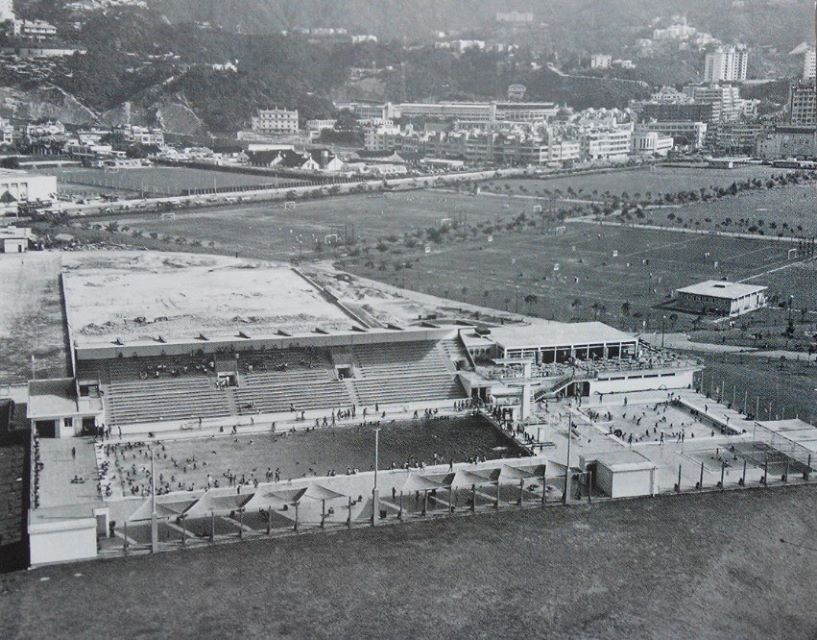
The Victoria Park Swimming Pool shortly after opening (later rebuilt)

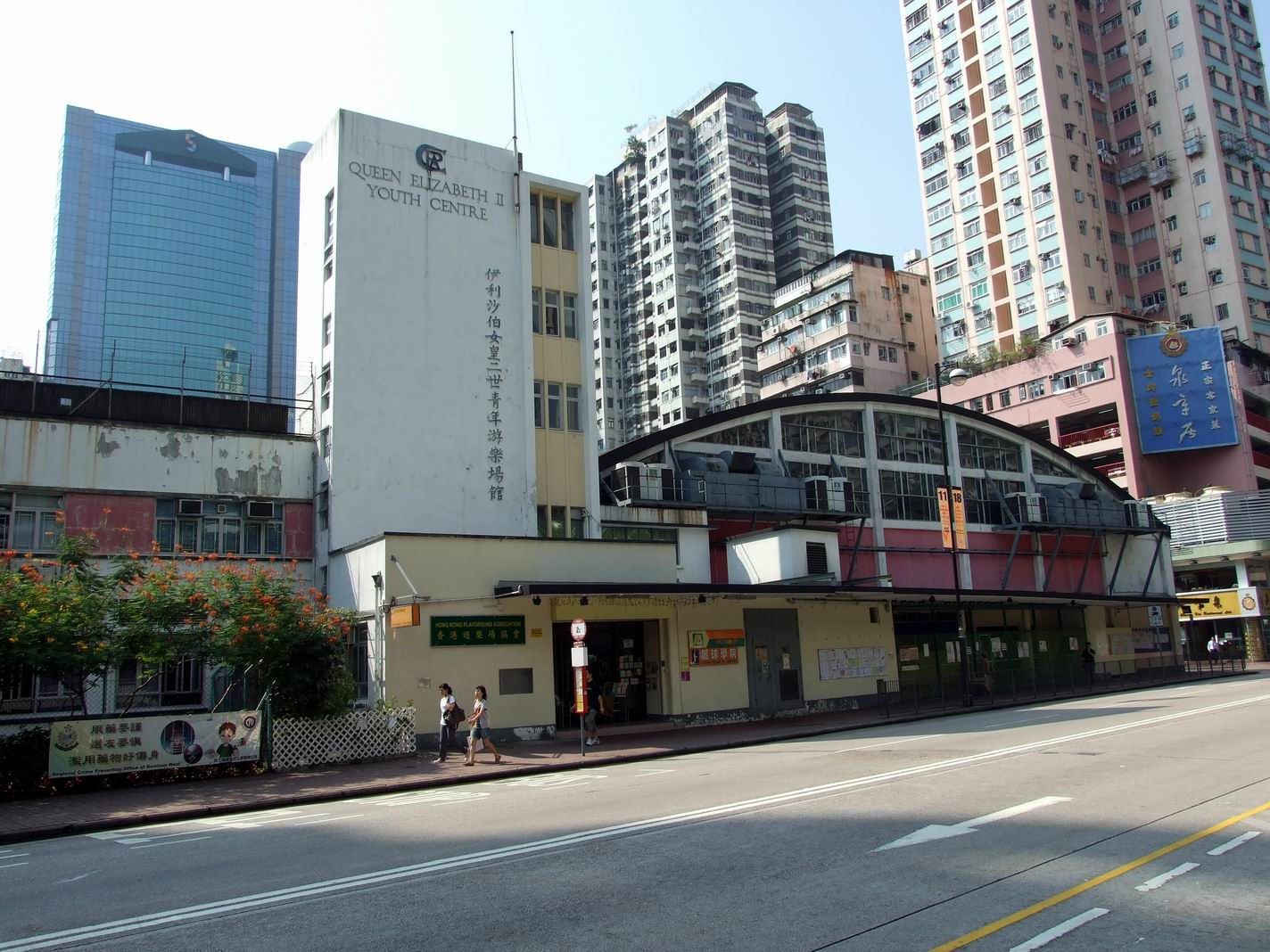
The Elizabeth II Youth Recreation Centre (now demolished)

Benson was a keen enthusiast of horse racing and equestrian sports. While in Malaya, he was active in polo, captaining polo teams in both Singapore and Penang. He also rode as an amateur jockey and was a member of the Penang Turf Club. Upon his transfer to Hong Kong in 1937 as manager of the Mercantile Bank, he immediately joined the Hong Kong Jockey Club as a member. After the Second World War, he was elected a steward of the club in 1947. Following his retirement from the bank in 1952, he was elected chairman in March 1953, succeeding Sir Arthur Morse.

After the war, the Jockey Club earned substantial revenue from horse racing betting and sweepstakes. With Benson's close connections to many charitable organisations, the club became increasingly active in philanthropy. In 1955, it formally decided to donate its annual surplus to charitable causes. During his chairmanship, Benson secured several major donations. One of the most significant was over one million Hong Kong dollars for the construction of the Victoria Park Swimming Pool, which opened in 1957. The pool was opened by then Governor Sir Alexander Grantham and was Hong Kong's first public swimming pool as well as its first public pool meeting Olympic standards. Benson and the other stewards made clear that the pool was intended for use by children from lower-income families, and entrance fees were set at affordable levels—50 cents for adults and 30 cents for children. The pool operated for over fifty years before being demolished and rebuilt in 2013.

Other major donations during his term included the Elizabeth II Youth Recreation Centre (commonly known as the Kowloon Indoor Stadium) in Mong Kok, whose foundation stone was laid in 1952 by Princess Marina, Duchess of Kent; the new clubhouse of the Kowloon branch of the St. John Ambulance Brigade, opened by Benson in May 1953 (with the club contributing half the construction cost of $25,000); and the new campus of the Chun Tok School for the Deaf in Diamond Hill, whose foundation stone was laid by Benson in June 1953 (with a donation of $60,000 from the club). Other facilities funded by the club included the new campus of the Hong Kong Sea School (foundation stone laid by Benson in December 1958), the Kowloon branch of the Family Planning Association of Hong Kong (foundation stone laid by Benson in May 1960), the Aberdeen Jockey Club Clinic (opened in December 1960), and the Shau Kei Wan Jockey Club Clinic (opened by Benson in July 1964). In the later years of his chairmanship, Benson secured a donation of $513,000 from the club to help the University of Hong Kong's Faculty of Medicine build the Lee Hysan Medical Library, which opened in January 1966. Benson was one of the guests of honour at the opening ceremony.

To make donations more systematic, Benson established the Hong Kong Jockey Club (Charities) Limited in 1959 to formulate donation policies and discuss uses with the government to ensure funds were used appropriately. Many years later, in 1993, the company was reorganised as the non-profit Hong Kong Jockey Club Charities Trust, which continues to work with the government and charitable organisations. During Benson's term, the club's charitable role in Hong Kong society was increasingly recognised. With the assistance of Governor Sir Robin Black and Colonial Office Assistant Secretary W. I. J. Wallace, the club was granted the "Royal" prefix by Queen Elizabeth II in 1960, becoming the Royal Hong Kong Jockey Club. The name remained until 1996, when, in anticipation of the 1997 handover, it reverted to the Hong Kong Jockey Club.

=== Racing matters ===
With the growing popularisation of horse racing betting, the club's only racecourse at Happy Valley frequently displayed the "red flag" indicating full capacity on race days from the mid-1960s. Although the club had considered building a new racecourse as early as 1964 during Benson's term, expansion of the grandstand and other facilities at Happy Valley only took place after he left office in 1969. The government only gave in-principle approval in October 1971 for a new racecourse at Sha Tin. Construction of Sha Tin Racecourse began in December 1973 and it opened in October 1978.

To cope with increasing betting turnover, Benson introduced new payout machines in 1966 that shortened payout times. He also proposed that the government allow the club to open off-course betting centres so that the public could place bets legally outside the racecourse, thereby combating illegal off-course betting. The government rejected the proposal on the grounds that the club's racing had not yet been professionalised. Illegal off-course betting was rampant at the time, and underground syndicates occasionally attempted to influence race outcomes. For example, in early May 1965, rumours spread that Benson had died and that the final race day of the season on 15 May would be abandoned after the third race. Because Benson had not appeared publicly for some time, the rumours gained traction. Even Sir Chau Sik-nin, who had just returned from abroad on the Friday evening, could not confirm their falsity. The rumours were finally dispelled on race day when Benson appeared at the racecourse to present trophies and personally conduct the sweepstake draw, and all races proceeded as scheduled. Public opinion afterwards speculated that off-course syndicates might have spread the rumours because they feared that favourites would win all races on Derby Day and did not want to accept too many bets, or because they had already taken on too many bets and hoped to reduce betting volume to avoid heavy payout liabilities.

Although faced with the problem of illegal betting, Benson, who had himself been an amateur rider, wanted to keep club racing amateur and opposed the introduction of professional jockeys. Throughout his term, the Hong Kong Jockey Club remained an amateur organisation. Only after his retirement, following the sensational "poisoned horse" scandal of 1969–1970, did the club decide in 1971 to turn amateur racing professional and recruit General Sir Bernard Penfold (then known as Major-General Penfold in some contexts) as general manager to drive reforms. Off-course betting centres were finally approved by the government in 1973.

Benson's term also saw several fatal riding accidents. On 2 January 1960, champion jockey Marcel Samarcq was riding "满堂春" in the fourth race at Happy Valley when he fell after completing four-fifths of the course. He was trampled on the head by a following horse and died on the spot. In mourning, the club cancelled the remaining races and refunded tickets—an unprecedented move after the war. In September that year, Benson established the Samarcq Memorial Scholarship Fund and the Jockeys' Welfare Fund to assist jockeys injured in racing accidents. However, another accident occurred on 21 January 1961 during the first race at Happy Valley. Three jockeys fell, and J. S. C. Neel, riding "花木兰", died of his injuries after being taken to hospital. "花木兰" was humanely destroyed, and the club cancelled races after the fifth and flew flags at half-mast. Finally, on 17 April 1965 (Easter Monday), local jockey He Weihang fell while riding "尽我所能" in the third race at Happy Valley, at the same spot where Samarcq had died. He was taken to hospital and pronounced dead. The club again cancelled races after the fifth and flew flags at half-mast. When Ho's funeral was held on 20 April, Benson led the club's stewards in paying respects.

=== The Poon Wah case ===
During Benson's term, the "Poon Wah case" (潘华案) occurred. Poon Wah was invited by the club in 1961 to become an apprentice jockey (commonly known as a "red badge" rider) and was also admitted as a club member. Later, however, the club discovered that he had falsified his occupation and date of birth when applying for membership. Although he claimed to be a merchant, he was in fact a fireman, and his real age was 36, not the 30 he had declared. Consequently, the club proposed to expel him from membership in October 1962, and the proposal was approved by the stewards in November. Although Poon retained his apprentice jockey status, when he applied in November 1962 to ride "Dictator" (独裁者) and "Powerful Rider" (力骑), Benson refused permission. The main reason was that, according to custom, "red badge" riders should not be over 30 when first admitted, but Poon was already over 30 when he became one. In addition, he had misled the club in his membership application, so he was considered unsuitable to ride.

Poon subsequently sued the club in the High Court over both his expulsion from membership and the ban on him riding. He sought restoration of his membership and riding rights, as well as damages. The case was heard in the civil division of the High Court in early February 1965. Several senior club officials testified, including Benson, who stated that the matter was so serious that the club had decided to expel Poon. He also noted that it was not uncommon to bar "red badge" riders from riding. The plaintiff argued, however, that the stewards' meeting to discuss Poon's expulsion had lasted only 15 minutes, with no inquiry held and Poon never given the opportunity to explain or appeal, which was unfair to him. The plaintiff also pointed out that although the club later realised the procedural error and nominally restored Poon's membership in June 1963, it continued to ban him from riding, causing him loss.

After several days of hearings, Mr Justice Ivo Rigby delivered judgment on 25 February 1965. He held that when the club invited Poon to join, it was not entirely unaware of his background, and the expulsion procedure had been flawed, causing injustice to Poon. He ruled in Poon's favour, ordering the club to fully restore his membership and associated rights and to pay him damages of $1,100. However, he refused Poon's request for an order compelling the club to allow him to ride.

== Later years ==
After retiring from the Mercantile Bank, Benson continued as chairman of the Jockey Club and held many other public positions. He was also appointed to the boards of several private companies, including Watson & Co. Ltd, Mandarin Oriental Hotel Group Ltd (City Hotels Ltd), Hong Kong Telephone Co. Ltd, Nanyang Cotton Mill Ltd, Hongkong Land Investment and Agency Co. Ltd, the Local Printing Press Ltd and the Ye Olde Printing Co. Ltd. He also served as chairman of the Green Island Cement Co. Ltd and chairman of Rediffusion (Hong Kong) Ltd, and from January 1963 to 1968 as chairman of the board of South China Morning Post Ltd. In the business world, he advocated increasing Hong Kong's textile export quotas and promoted the establishment of an industrial federation to protect the interests of the manufacturing sector, which contributed to the government's creation of the Hong Kong General Chamber of Commerce's industrial section and eventually the Federation of Hong Kong Industries in 1960.

However, Benson's health deteriorated in later years. In September 1967, he stepped down as chairman of the Jockey Club after 14 years, succeeded by Jake Saunders of the Hongkong and Shanghai Banking Corporation. The following year, he resigned from the position of steward, which he had held continuously for 21 years, and successively relinquished all his business and public appointments. Although he suffered from chronic illness in his later years, he continued to visit the racecourse regularly to watch the horse racing he loved. Benson died in Hong Kong on 17 November 1972 at the age of 76. His funeral was held at 2:30 pm on 21 November at St. John's Cathedral in Central. Both his sons travelled from Britain to attend, along with his adopted daughter, many close friends, business figures and senior government officials. The pallbearers included the then Jockey Club chairman Sir Douglas Clague, the businessman Noel Croucher, former University of Hong Kong Vice-Chancellor Sir Lindsay Ride, and club steward Dr. Douglas Laing. His body was later cremated at the Cape Collinson Crematorium, and, in accordance with his wishes, his ashes were scattered over the sea at Junk Bay. After his death, the Jockey Club organised the Benson Cup race in his memory. The race continued until 1997, after the handover of Hong Kong.

== Personal life ==
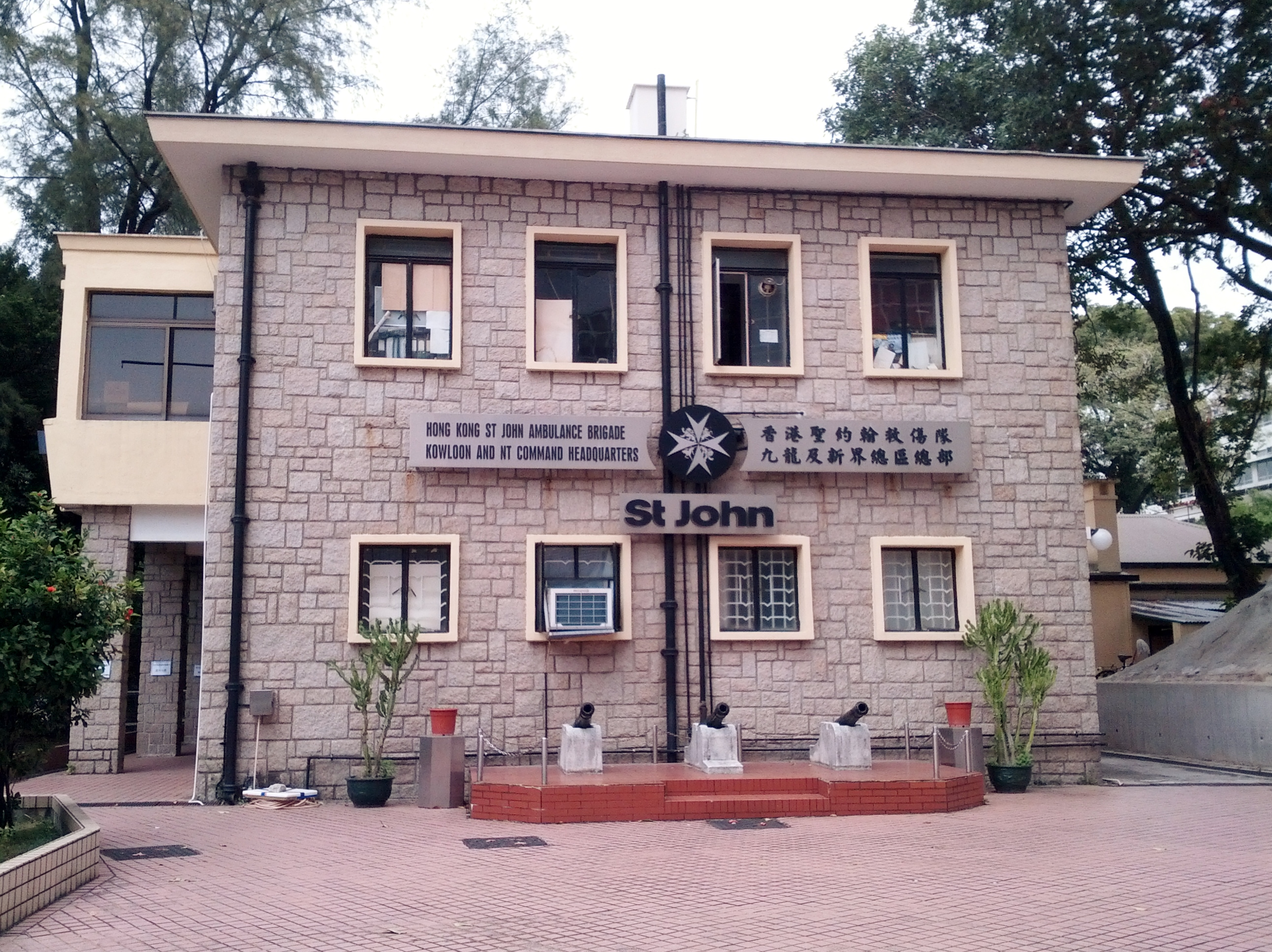
Benson officiated at the opening of the Kowloon branch clubhouse of the St. John Ambulance Brigade on 7 May 1953

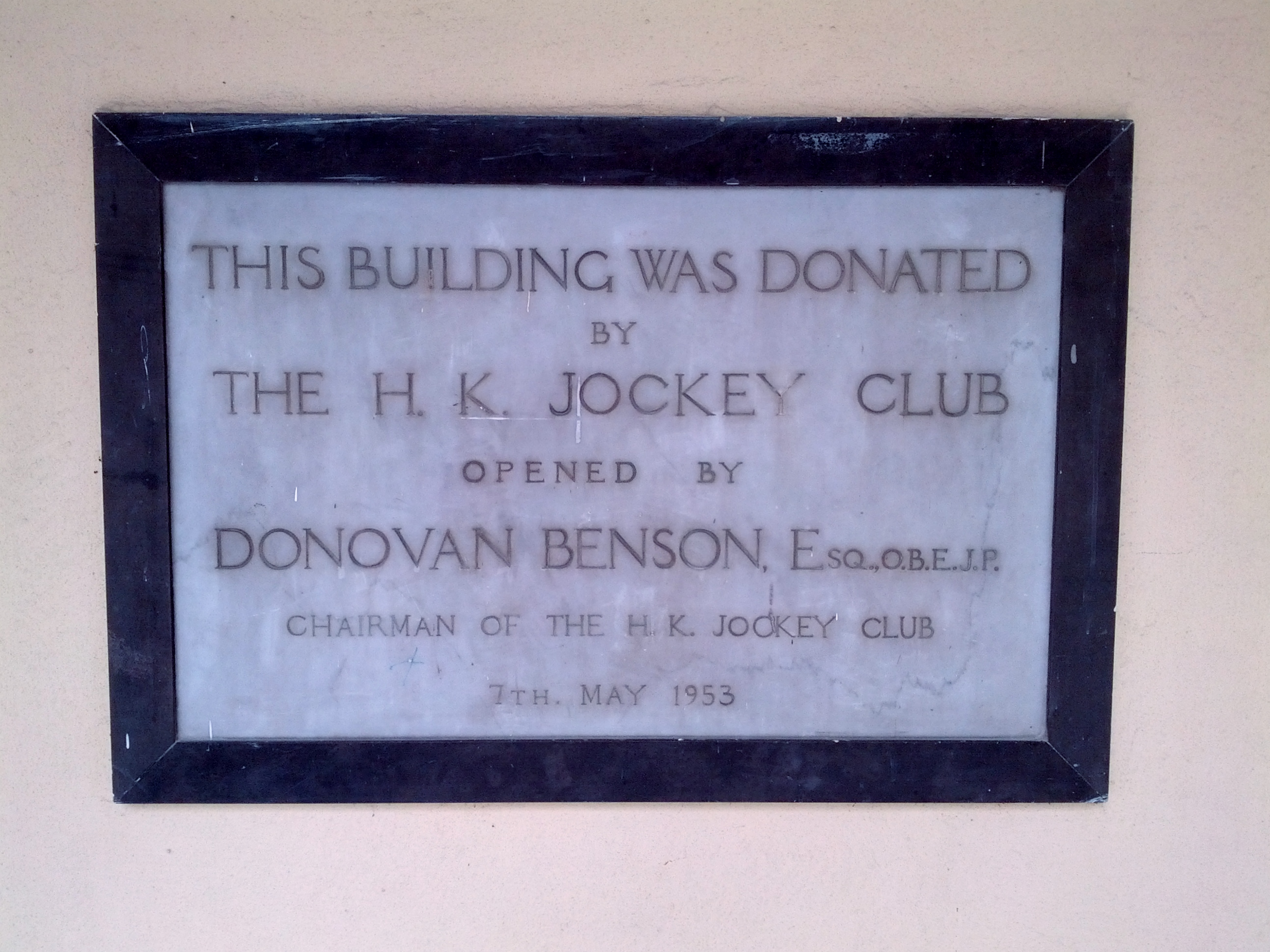
Foundation plaque at the St. John Ambulance Brigade Kowloon branch clubhouse

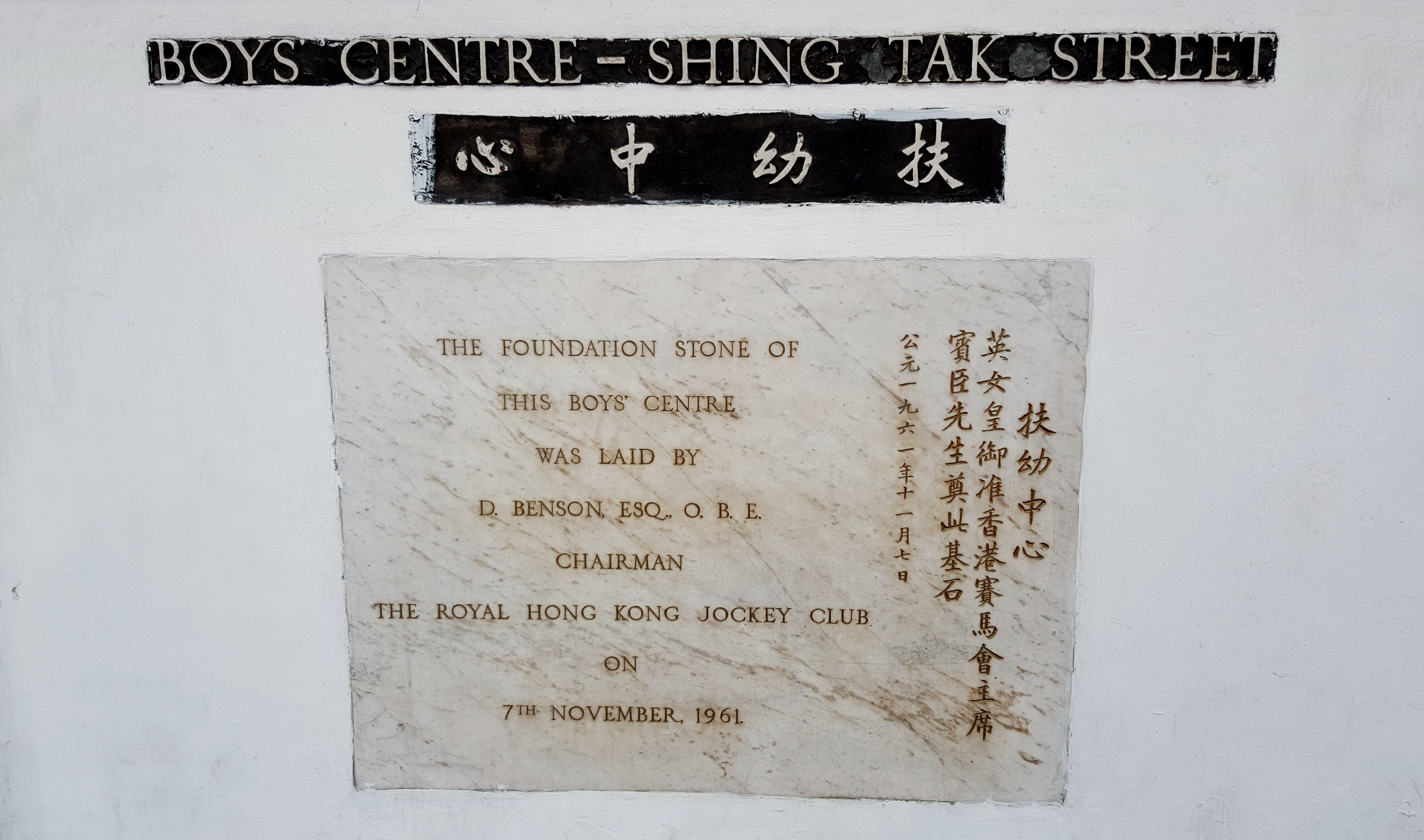
Benson laid the foundation stone for the Boys Centre (Shing Tak Street) on 7 November 1961

Benson was a member of the Church of England. He married Mary Elizabeth Benson in Singapore in 1923. They had two sons. The elder, Donovan Roy Benson (1925–2009), served in the Royal Navy as a hydrographic surveyor and reached the rank of lieutenant commander. The younger, Dr. William Geoffrey Benson (1928–2010), was a specialist physician. In addition to his two sons, Benson had an adopted daughter, Patricia Lee. His wife died in 1956, so in his later years, when he was chronically ill, he was cared for by his adopted daughter.

Benson's hobbies included horse racing, polo and hunting. He was a member of the Penang Turf Club and the (Royal) Hong Kong Jockey Club, and served as chairman and steward of the latter. He owned several racehorses in Hong Kong, including "Same Again", "Say When" and "Wodonga" in his earlier years, and "Paddy", "Bunkum" and "Irish Holiday" in later years.

While living in Hong Kong, Benson resided for many years on the top floor of St. John's Building at 1 Garden Road, Mid-Levels, Hong Kong Island. The flat employed a maid and a cook. On 26 December 1962, while the household was out celebrating Christmas, they returned to find the flat in disarray and signs of burglary. Cash and jewellery worth over $4,000 were stolen. In the early morning of 26 April 1963, the flat was burgled again. Jewellery and cash worth over $3,000 were taken, including several hundred dollars in cash, a diamond wristwatch, diamond rings, a diamond-set gold bracelet and diamond earrings. Neither case was solved.

== Honours ==
=== Awards ===
- The following is a full list of honours with post-nominal letters:
  - Unofficial Justice of the Peace for Penang (J.P.) (King's Official Birthday, 1935)
  - Unofficial Justice of the Peace for Hong Kong (J.P.) (20 May 1938)
  - Officer of the Order of the British Empire (O.B.E.) (Queen's Official Birthday, 1952)
- Benson Cup: A horse racing event organised by the (Royal) Hong Kong Jockey Club in memory of Benson and named after him. It was discontinued after the 1997 handover of Hong Kong.

== See also ==
- Mercantile Bank of India, London and China
- Hong Kong Jockey Club
- Arthur Morse
- Jake Saunders
- Bernard Penfold
- Dhun Jehangir Ruttonjee
- Bernard Penfold
- Dhun Jehangir Ruttonjee
- Chau Sik-nin

== Bibliography ==
=== English sources ===
- "Marriage-BENSON-GWYN", Western Mail, May 1894.
- "Social and Personal", The Straits Times, 16 July 1920, p. 8.
- "Mr. D. Benson", The Singapore Free Press and Mercantile Advertiser, 19 October 1922, p. 6.
- "Certificates Of Honour For Straits Settlements", The Singapore Free Press and Mercantile Advertiser, 4 June 1935, p. 1.
- "Penang Turf Club Sued", The Singapore Free Press and Mercantile Advertiser, 10 October 1935, p. 10.
- Merchant Taylors' School register, 1561-1934. London: Merchant Taylors' School, 1936.
- "Mr. D. Benson", The Singapore Free Press and Mercantile Advertiser, 12 February 1937, p. 6.
- "No. 863", The Hong Kong Government Gazette, 26 November 1937, p. 889.
- "No. 401", The Hong Kong Government Gazette, 20 May 1938, p. 385.
- "No. 865", The Hong Kong Government Gazette, 2 August 1940, p. 1243.
- "No. 1384", The Hong Kong Government Gazette, 21 November 1941, p. 1773.
- "No. 1449 ", The Hong Kong Government Gazette, 5 December 1941, p. 1884.
- Dickerman, Marion, and Taylor, Ruth, Who's who in Labor. Dryden Press, 1946.
- Burckel, Christian E., Who's who in the United Nations. New York: C. E. Burckel & Associates, 1951.
- "Supplement to Issue 39555 Archived 2021-04-22 at the Wayback Machine", London Gazette, 30 May 1952, p. 3030.
- Fabian News. Fabian Society, 1964.
- Lee, P. C., Hongkong Album. Hong Kong: P.C. Lee, 1966.
- "Death of Mr D. Benson", Sunday Post-Herald Vol. 23 No. 47, 19 November 1972, p. 2.
- "Tribute to Mr Donovan Benson", The South China Morning Post Vol. XXVIII No. 277, 22 November 1972, p. 8.
- "Deaths Archived 2021-05-04 at the Wayback Machine", The Montreal Gazette, 3 October 1977, p. 39.
- Families. Ontario Genealogical Society, 1981.
- Coates, Austin, China Races. Hong Kong: Oxford University Press, 1983. ISBN 978-0-19581-541-2
- Evans, Dafydd Emrys, Constancy of Purpose: An Account of the Foundation and History of the Hong Kong College of Medicine and the Faculty of Medicine of The University of Hong Kong, 1887-1987 Archived 2012-02-10 at the Wayback Machine. Hong Kong: Hong Kong University Press, 1987. ISBN 978-9-88220-086-9
- Green, Edwin, and Kinsey, Sara, The Paradise Bank: The Mercantile Bank of India, 1893-1984. Ashgate, 1999.
- "Issue 59367 Archived 2021-04-20 at the Wayback Machine", London Gazette, 19 March 2010, p. 4930.
- "BENSON, Dr. William Geoffrey (Bill) Archived 2021-05-04 at the Wayback Machine", Telegraph Announcement, August 2010.
- Kua, Paul, Scouting in Hong Kong, 1910-2010. Hong Kong: Scout Association of Hong Kong, 2011. ISBN 978-9-62783-569-1
- Kuntz, Joëlle, and Murray, Edmundo, "Leaders, Artists and Spies Archived 2021-03-21 at the Wayback Machine", Centre William Rappard: Home of the World Trade Organization. Geneva: World Trade Organization, 2011. ISBN 978-9-28703-758-9
- The HSBC Group: Our Story Archived 2015-09-08 at the Wayback Machine. UK: HSBC Holdings plc., 2013.
- Hackney Downs School Roll of Honour 1914-1918 In Memoriam. UK: The Clove Club, 2013.
- "The Hong Kong Jockey Club Archives: Charities & community Archived 2019-12-04 at the Wayback Machine", Hong Kong Memory.
- "The Charities Trust: Overview", The Hong Kong Jockey Club.

=== Chinese sources ===
- "Fáng láo huì yǐ chénglì" 防癆會已成立 [The Anti-Tuberculosis Association Has Been Established]. 香港華字日報 (in Chinese). 25 March 1940. p. 3 (second sheet).
- "Jiǎngshǎng yǒugōng, shǔ huá mín sī hè jiànshì huò CMG, běn bào dǒngshì lǐ yào xiáng huò OBE" 獎賞有功，署華民司鶴健士獲CMG，本報董事李耀祥獲OBE [For Meritorious Service: He Jianshi Awarded CMG, Newspaper Director Li Yaoxiang Awarded OBE]. 華僑日報 (in Chinese). 5 June 1952. p. 1 (second sheet).
- "Yà lì shān dà dàshà luòchéng, shāng háng fēn fēn qiān rù, yǒu lì yín háng jí jiāng chāi xiè" 亞力山大大廈落成，商行紛紛遷入，有利銀行即將拆卸 [Alexander Building Completed, Businesses Moving In; Mercantile Bank About to Be Demolished]. 香港工商日報 (in Chinese). 29 June 1952. p. 5.
- "Yǒu lì yín háng zǒng lǐ bīn chén xíng jiāng tuì xiū" 有利銀行總理賓臣行將退休 [Mercantile Bank General Manager Benson Is About to Retire]. 香港工商日報 (in Chinese). 25 July 1952. p. 6.
- "Yǒu lì yín háng xíng zhǐ gǎi jiàn shí céng dàshà, xiàn qiān wǎng zhōng tiān xíng yíng yè" 有利銀行行址改建十層大廈，現遷往中天行營業 [Mercantile Bank Site Rebuilt into Ten-Storey Building, Now Relocated to Zhongtian for Business]. 華僑日報 (in Chinese). 4 August 1952. p. 1 (second sheet).
- "Qián yǒu lì yín háng zǒng lǐ bīn chén jì mó shì rèn gǎng mǎ huì zhǔ xí" 前有利銀行總理賓臣繼摩士任港馬會主席 [Former Mercantile Bank General Manager Benson Succeeds Morse as Chairman of the Hong Kong Jockey Club]. 華僑日報 (in Chinese). 5 March 1953. p. 2 (second sheet).
- "Wàng jiǎo yī lì shā bó qīng nián guǎn, quán bù xīn xíng jiàn zhù" 旺角伊利沙伯青年館，全部新型建築 [Queen Elizabeth Youth Centre in Mong Kok – All New Construction]. 華僑日報 (in Chinese). 9 April 1953. p. 4 (second sheet).
- "Xīn huì suǒ jiē mù" 新會所揭幕 [New Clubhouse Officially Opened]. 華僑日報 (in Chinese). 8 May 1953. p. 1 (second sheet).
- "Zhēn duó lóng yǎ xué xiào, xīn xiào shè bīn chén qǐ yào, mǎ huì zhù liù wàn kuò jiàn chéng gōng" 真鐸聾啞學校，新校舍賓臣啟鑰，馬會助六萬擴建成功 [Chen Duo School for the Deaf: New Campus Opened by Benson with HK$60,000 Contribution from the Jockey Club]. 華僑日報 (in Chinese). 7 June 1953. p. 1 (second sheet).
- "Ér tóng fǎ tíng fǎ guān, bīn chén fǎn yīng dù jiǎ" 兒童法庭法官，賓臣返英渡假 [Children's Court Magistrate Benson Returns to England for Vacation]. 華僑日報 (in Chinese). 21 June 1953. p. 1 (second sheet).
- "Gé liàng hóng zǒng dū cān guān mǎ zhī huàn yǎng jí xùn liàn" 葛量洪總督參觀馬之豢養及訓練 [Governor Grantham Visits Horse Breeding and Training Facilities]. 華僑日報 (in Chinese). 12 November 1953. p. 2 (second sheet).
- "Yǒu lì yín háng xīn shà kāi mù" 有利銀行新廈開幕 [Mercantile Bank New Building Officially Opened]. 香港工商日報 (in Chinese). 12 December 1953. p. 5.
- "Bīn chén jí lǐ yào xiáng guǎng bò hū yù juān zhù fáng láo huì" 賓臣及李耀祥廣播呼籲捐助防癆會 [Benson and Li Yaoxiang Broadcast Appeal for Donations to the Anti-Tuberculosis Association]. 香港工商日報 (in Chinese). 13 April 1954. p. 6.
- "Bīn chén dāng huì zhǎng tiáo jiàn, yào bù zhǔn jì zhě páng tīng, jié guǒ yīn bèi zhí wěi fǒu jué zhǐ hǎo cí zhí" 賓臣當會長條件，要不准記者旁聽，結果因被執委否決只好辭職 [Benson's Condition for Chairmanship Was to Ban Reporters from Meetings – Rejected by Executive Committee, Forcing His Resignation]. 香港工商日報 (in Chinese). 25 August 1956. p. 7.
- "Xiū dùn ér tóng fú lì huì zuó rì jǔ xíng nián huì, bīn chén chán lián huì zhǎng" 修頓兒童福利會昨日舉行年會，賓臣蟬聯會長 [Shum Tak Children's Welfare Association Held Annual Meeting Yesterday, Benson Re-elected Chairman]. 香港工商日報 (in Chinese). 24 April 1958. p. 8.
- "Nán yáng shā chǎng gǔ dōng nián huì, bīn chén pàn néng zǎo rì zǔ shè gōng zǒng lián huì" 南洋紗廠股東年會，賓臣盼能早日組設工總聯會 [Nanyang Cotton Mill Shareholders' Annual Meeting – Benson Hopes for Early Establishment of Industrial Federation]. 香港工商日報 (in Chinese). 19 June 1958. p. 5.
- "Mǎ huì zī zhù háng hǎi xué xiào xīng jiàn xīn táng, bīn chén zhǔ chí diàn jī lǐ" 馬會資助航海學校興建新堂，賓臣主持奠基禮 [Jockey Club Funds New Building for Nautical School, Benson Presides Over Foundation Stone Laying]. 香港工商日報 (in Chinese). 13 December 1958. p. 7.
- "Guàn jūn qí shī sī mǎ kè duò mǎ sàng shēng" 冠軍騎師司馬克墮馬喪生 [Champion Jockey Samarcq Dies After Fall]. 大公報 (in Chinese). 3 January 1960. p. 5 (second sheet).
- "Jiā tíng jì huà huì jiǔ lóng zhī huì dìng qī jǔ xíng diàn jī lǐ" 家庭計劃會九龍支會定期舉行奠基禮 [Family Planning Association Kowloon Branch Holds Foundation Stone Laying Ceremony]. 香港工商日報 (in Chinese). 4 May 1960. p. 7.
- "Mǎ huì bō shí wàn yuán zuò jì niàn sī mǎ kè jiǎng xué jī jīn" 馬會撥十萬元作紀念司馬克獎學基金 [Jockey Club Allocates HK$100,000 for Samarcq Memorial Scholarship Fund]. 香港工商日報 (in Chinese). 24 September 1960. p. 5.
- "Mǎ huì kǎi juān jiǔ shí wǔ wàn yuán xīng jiàn, xiāng gǎng zǐ zhěn suǒ kāi mù" 馬會慨捐九十五萬元興建，香港仔診所開幕 [Jockey Club Donates HK$950,000 for Aberdeen Clinic Opening]. 香港工商日報 (in Chinese). 15 December 1960. p. 5.
- "Qí shī lǐ lù duò mǎ cǎn sǐ" 騎師李路墮馬慘死 [Jockey Li Lu Dies After Fall]. 香港工商日報 (in Chinese). 22 January 1961. p. 5.
- "Mǎ huì zhǔ xí bīn chén zhù zhái bèi qiè sǔn shī sì qiān yú yuán" 馬會主席賓臣住宅被竊損失四千餘元 [Jockey Club Chairman Benson's Residence Burglarized, Loss Over HK$4,000]. 香港工商日報 (in Chinese). 28 December 1962. p. 6.
- "Mǎ huì zhǔ xí bīn chén zhù zhái zuó chén dì èr cì shī qiè, sǔn shī cái wù shù qiān yuán" 馬會主席賓臣住宅昨晨第二次失竊，損失財物數千元 [Benson's Residence Burglarized Again, Loss of Several Thousand Dollars]. 香港工商日報 (in Chinese). 27 April 1963. p. 5.
- "Fáng láo huì chóu mù jīng fèi jìn quán lì pū miè fèi láo" 防癆會籌募經費盡全力撲滅肺癆 [Anti-Tuberculosis Association Raises Funds to Eradicate Tuberculosis]. 華僑日報 (in Chinese). 7 May 1963. p. 4 (third sheet).
- "Shāo jī wān fēn kē zhěn suǒ jīn rì kāi mù lǐ" 筲箕灣分科診所今日開幕禮 [Shau Kei Wan Specialist Clinic Officially Opened Today]. 香港工商日報 (in Chinese). 15 July 1964. p. 5.
- "Xiāng gǎng fáng láo huì huān yàn qián zhǔ xí bīn chén tuì xiū, sì dǒng shì huò pān xūn xián" 香港防癆會歡宴前主席賓臣退休，四董事獲頒勳銜 [Hong Kong Anti-TB Association Banquet Honours Retiring Chairman Benson, Four Directors Awarded Honours]. 香港工商日報 (in Chinese). 4 September 1964. p. 5.
- "Mǎ huì zhǔ xí bīn chén tán pān huá bèi gé shì" 馬會主席賓臣談潘華被革事 [Jockey Club Chairman Benson Discusses Poon Wah's Expulsion]. 大公報 (in Chinese). 17 February 1965. p. 5 (second sheet).
- "Mǎ huì zhǔ xí bīn chén gòng rèn zǎo yǐ jué dìng gé chú pān huá huì jí, wèi yǒu gěi yǔ shàng sù jiě shì jī huì" 馬會主席賓臣供認早已決定革除潘華會籍，未有給予上訴解釋機會 [Chairman Benson Admits Decision to Expel Poon Wah Was Made Early, No Appeal Opportunity Given]. 香港工商日報 (in Chinese). 17 February 1965. p. 6.
- "Dá fù shī wén dà lǜ shī pán wèn shí, chéng rèn pān huá shì yōu yuè qí shī" 答覆施文大律師盤問時，承認潘華是優越騎師 [In Reply to Counsel's Questioning, Admits Poon Wah Is a Superior Jockey]. 香港工商日報 (in Chinese). 17 February 1965. p. 6.
- "Sài mǎ huì zhǔ xí bīn chén zuò zhèng, pān huá xū bào shì shí, gù yǔ gé chú huì jí" 賽馬會主席賓臣作證，潘華虛報事實，故予革除會籍 [Jockey Club Chairman Benson Testifies: Poon Wah Falsified Facts, Hence Expelled]. 華僑日報 (in Chinese). 17 February 1965. p. 2 (second sheet).
- "Pān huá shì jiàn yīn zǎo yǒu jué dìng, kāi huì lì shí jǐn shí wǔ fēn zhōng" 潘華事件因早有決定，開會歷時僅十五分鐘 [Poon Wah Case Decided Early, Meeting Lasted Only 15 Minutes]. 香港工商日報 (in Chinese). 18 February 1965. p. 5.
- "Bù zhǔn pān huá chū sài yǒu cuò wù, qǐng fǎ tíng pān lìng yǔ yǐ gān yù" 不准潘華出賽有錯誤，請法庭頒令予以干預 [Ban on Poon Wah Riding Was Wrongful, Court Asked to Intervene]. 華僑日報 (in Chinese). 19 February 1965. p. 2 (second sheet).
- "Hóng pái qí shī kòng gào mǎ huì dé zhí huò péi cháng qiān yī bǎi yuán, yào qí mǎ shàng dài pī zhǔn" 紅牌騎師控吿馬會得直獲賠償千一百元，要騎馬尚待批准 [Red Badge Jockey Wins Lawsuit Against Jockey Club, Awarded HK$1,100; Riding Rights Still Pending Approval]. 南洋商報 (in Chinese). 2 March 1965. p. 8. Archived from the original on 4 March 2016.
- "Hé wěi háng duò mǎ cǎn sǐ" 何煒航墮馬慘死 [Jockey Ho Wai-hang Dies After Fall]. 香港工商日報 (in Chinese). 18 April 1965. p. 4.
- "Qí shī hé wěi háng zuó chū bìn" 騎師何煒航昨出殯 [Jockey Ho Wai-hang's Funeral Yesterday]. 大公報 (in Chinese). 21 April 1965. p. 5 (second sheet).
- "Yǒu lì rén shì hū yù shì mín bǎo chí lěng jìng, qiè wù qīng xìn yáo yán" 有力人士呼籲市民保持冷靜，切勿輕信謠言 [Prominent Figures Urge Public to Stay Calm and Not Believe Rumours]. 華僑日報 (in Chinese). 18 May 1965. p. 1 (second sheet).
- "Dǎ pǐ sài wài wéi dǔ mǎ jí tuán dǎo guǐ bō yáo yán jìng shuō mǎ huì zhǔ xí sǐ le" 打吡賽外圍賭馬集團搗鬼播謠言竟說馬會主席死了 [Derby Off-Course Betting Syndicate Spreads Rumour That Jockey Club Chairman Has Died]. 南洋商報 (in Chinese). 20 May 1965. p. 17. Archived from the original on 4 March 2016.
- "Mǎ huì zhǔ xí qīn lín jiǎo zhū yáo yán shǐ xíng bù gōng zì pò" 馬會主席親臨攪珠謠言始行不攻自破 [Chairman Benson Personally Attends Draw, Rumour Collapses]. 南洋商報 (in Chinese). 20 May 1965. p. 17.
- "Mián zhī yè qù nián hěn kùn nán, jīn nián bìng wèi xiǎn zhù hǎo zhuǎn" 綿織業去年很困難，今年並未顯著好轉 [Cotton Weaving Industry Faced Difficulties Last Year, No Significant Improvement This Year]. 大公報 (in Chinese). 5 July 1966. p. 4 (first sheet).
- "Xià jiè mǎ jì jié shù hòu, zhǔ xí bīn chén tuì xiū" 下屆馬季結束後，主席賓臣退休 [After Next Racing Season, Chairman Benson Will Retire]. 香港工商日報 (in Chinese). 7 October 1966. p. 4.
- "Sài mǎ jì rú qī xià yuè kāi luó, yù liào běn jiè dìng bì shèng kuàng kōng qián" 賽馬季如期下月開鑼，預料本屆定必盛況空前 [Horse Racing Season to Open as Scheduled Next Month, Expected to Be Unprecedentedly Grand]. 華僑日報 (in Chinese). 4 September 1967. p. 4 (first sheet).
- "Sài mǎ huì zhōu nián dà huì, sāng dá shì chán lián zhǔ xí" 賽馬會週年大會，桑達士蟬聯主席 [Jockey Club Annual General Meeting – Sandberg Re-elected Chairman]. 香港工商日報 (in Chinese). 28 September 1968. p. 7.
- "Péng fú jiāng jūn tuì xiū zhēn yīn" 彭福將軍退休真因 [Real Reason Behind General Penfold’s Retirement]. 香港工商日報 (in Chinese). 1 May 1979. p. 3.
- Lì shǐ jí qū nèi gòng xiàn 歷史及區內貢獻 [History and Contributions to the District] (in Chinese). Hong Kong: 香港賽馬會 - 沙田馬場與我共成長. 2003. Archived from the original on 10 March 2005.
- 60 zhōu nián jì niàn tè kān 60周年紀念特刊 [60th Anniversary Commemorative Special Issue] (PDF) (in Chinese). Hong Kong: 香港防癆心臟及胸病協會. 2008. Archived from the original (PDF) on 16 January 2014.
- Zhèng Bǎo hóng (2014). Mò mò xiàng shàng yóu: Xiāng gǎng wǔ shí nián dài shè huì yǐng xiàng 默默向上游：香港五十年代社會影像 [Quietly Moving Upstream: Social Images of Hong Kong in the 1950s] (in Chinese). Hong Kong: 商務印書館. ISBN 978-962-07-5626-9. Archived from the original on 4 May 2021.
- 劳家乐 (1 August 2015). "Xiāng gǎng yǒu lì yín háng zhǐ bì fā xíng zī liào chū tàn" 香港有利銀行紙幣發行資料初探 [Preliminary Study on the Note Issuance of the Mercantile Bank of Hong Kong] (in Chinese). Archived from the original on 2 July 2021.
- "Lì shǐ" 歷史 [History]. 香港賽馬會. 1 August 2015. Archived from the original on 5 March 2016.
- "Sài shì rì qī: 24/11/1996 – Shā tián: Dì 8 chǎng" 賽事日期:24/11/1996－沙田：第8場 [Race Date: 24/11/1996 – Sha Tin: Race 8]. 香港賽馬會. 1 August 2015. Archived from the original on 11 November 2017.
- "Bīn chén (zhǔ xí) 1953-1967" 賓臣 (主席) 1953-1967 [Benson (Chairman) 1953–1967]. 講馬港歷史 (in Chinese). 4 October 2015. Archived from the original on 4 May 2021.

Business positions
Preceded by Robert Kennedy	Manager, Mercantile Bank of India, London and China; 1937–1952	Succeeded by Alexander Godfrey Donn
Other offices
Preceded by Sir Arthur Morse	Chairman, Hong Kong Jockey Club; 1953–1960	Succeeded by Chairman, Royal Hong Kong Jockey Club
Preceded by Chairman, Hong Kong Jockey Club	Chairman, Royal Hong Kong Jockey Club; 1960–1967	Succeeded by Sir Jake Saunders
Non-profit organization positions
Preceded by Duncan Macintosh	Chairman, St. John Ambulance Brigade Council, Hong Kong; 1953–1954	Succeeded by F. S. Coote
Preceded by John L. Marden	President, Hong Kong Boy Scouts Association; 1959–1964	Succeeded by George Ronald Ross
Preceded by Sir Chau Sik-nin	Chairman, The Hong Kong Tuberculosis, Chest and Heart Diseases Association; 1963–1964	Succeeded by Dhun Jehangir Ruttonjee
