= Ruttonjee =

Ruttonjee is a Parsi surname. Notable people with the surname include:

- Jehangir Hormusjee Ruttonjee (1880–1960), Hong Kong businessman and philanthropist
- Dhun Jehangir Ruttonjee (1903–1974), Hong Kong businessman and philanthropist, son of Jehangir

== See also ==
- Ruttonjee Hospital, a government hospital in Wan Chai, Hong Kong
