= HKPA =

HKPA may refer to:

- Hong Kong Playground Association, a not for profit organisation
- Hong Kong Progressive Alliance, was a political party of Hong Kong
- Howell Killick Partridge and Amis, British architectural firm
