= Seamen's Hospital =

Former hospital in Wan Chai, Hong Kong

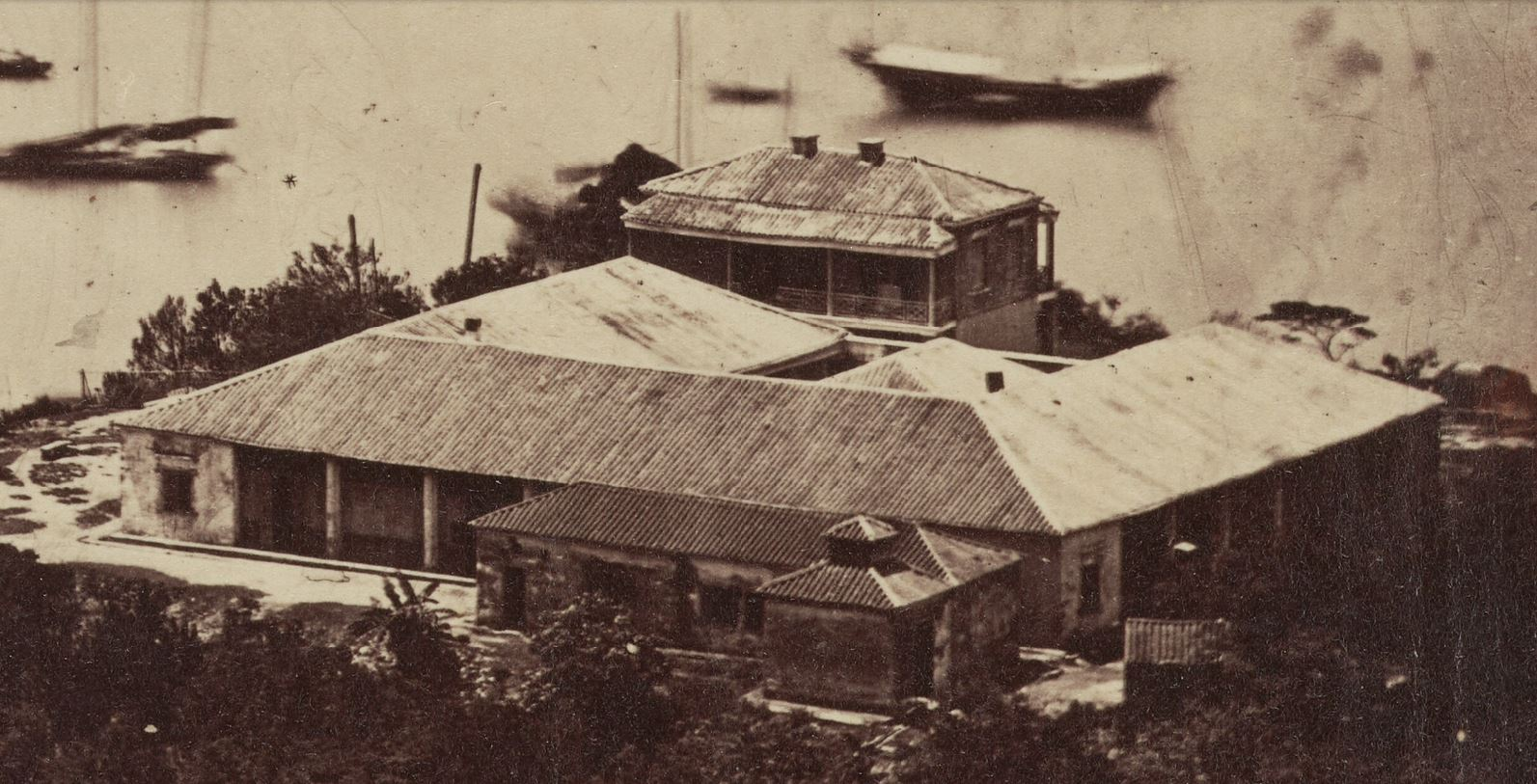
- Seamen's Hospital in c. 1860

- Location within Hong Kong

Geography
- Location: Wan Chai, Hong Kong
- Coordinates: 22.2759°N 114.1753°E

History
- Founded: 1843
- Closed: 1873

Links
- Lists: Hospitals in Hong Kong

Seamen's Hospital was originally opened by Peter Young, a surgeon of the Honourable East India Company in 1843 during the First Opium War.

== History ==
The hospital was financially supported by Jardine Matheson and Company in Wan Chai, colonial Hong Kong under the British Royal Navy. The facility was closed in 1873 due to financial difficulties.

The hospital buildings were purchased by the Royal Navy and reopened that same year as a Royal Naval Hospital (RNH Hong Kong). During the Second World War the buildings were severely damaged. After the war, a new Royal Naval Hospital was opened on the Peak; the original site in Wan Chai was converted into the Ruttonjee Hospital in late 1940s.

== See also ==
- HMS Minden
- HMS Tamar
- Tung Wah Hospital
