= Royal Naval Hospital (Hong Kong) =

Former hospital in Hong Kong Island, Hong Kong

- Royal Navy
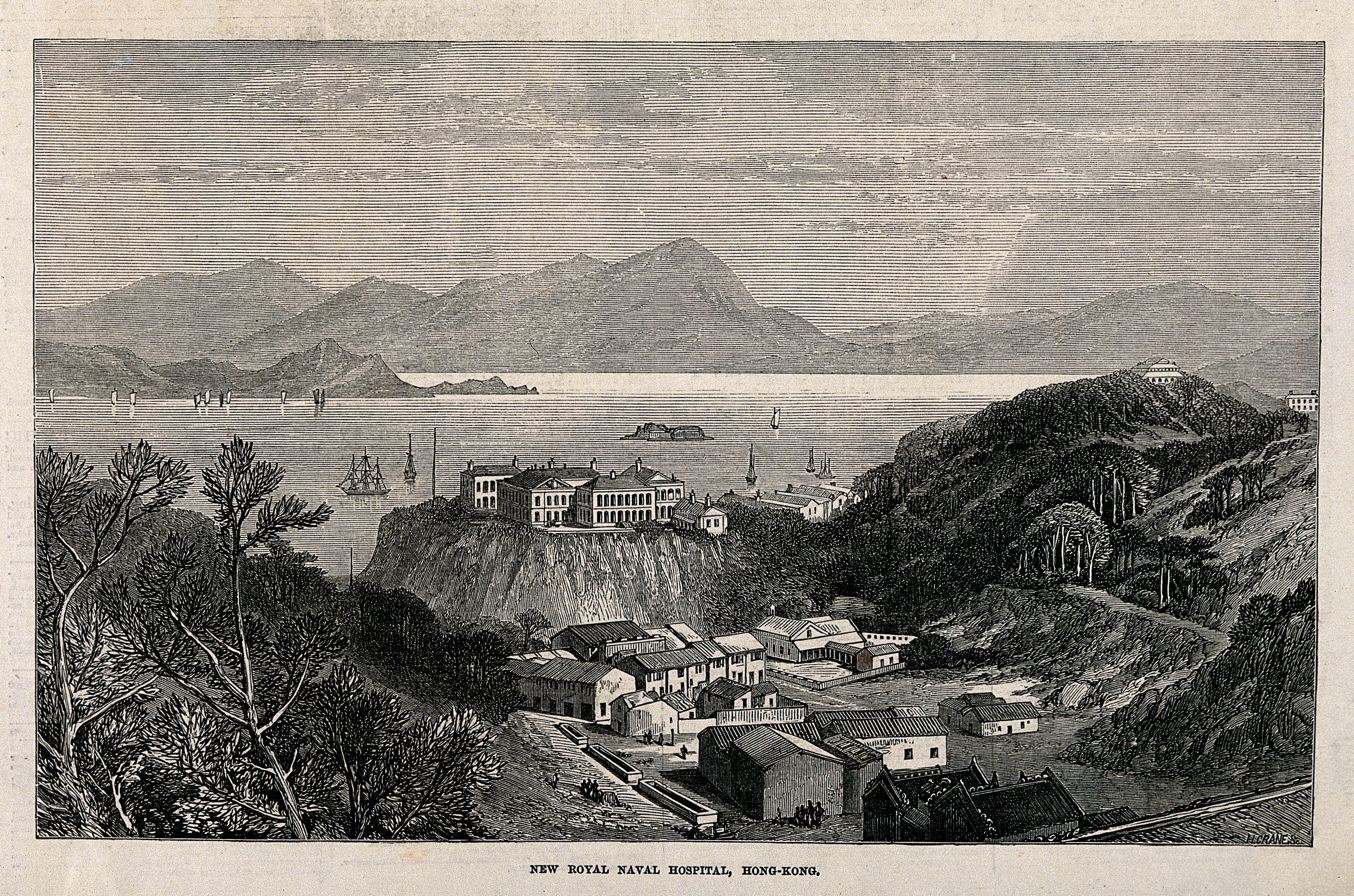
- The Royal Naval Hospital on Mount Shadwell

- Location within Hong Kong

Geography
- Location: Wan Chai, Hong Kong Island, Hong Kong
- Coordinates: 22.2784°N 114.1661°E

Organisation
- Type: Military

History
- Founded: 1841; 185 years ago
- Closed: 1956; 70 years ago

Links
- Lists: Hospitals in Hong Kong

Royal Naval Hospital (Hong Kong) was a Royal Naval Hospital, established in the 19th century on Hong Kong Island in British Hong Kong.

== Origins ==
In early 1841, Hong Kong was occupied for the first time by British. However, a plague, likely malaria, spread throughout men with at least 1100 fell sick, claiming even the life of captain Humphrey Fleming Senhouse. During the same month, the Navy constructed makeshift structures, such as store sheds and a naval hospital, to serve their needs. Months later, in July, a typhoon destroyed the hospital, and Wellington Barracks was afterwards built on the site. By 1843, the disease had killed 24% of the men.

Subsequently, a succession of naval vessels served as hospital ships: first HMS Minden, a third-rate sailing ship, then HMS Alligator, a sixth-rate frigate, from 1846, which was later supplemented by HMS Melville, another third-rate sailing ship, from 1857.

== Mount Shadwell ==
In 1873, HMS Melville was sold, for HK$35,000, and the proceeds used to purchase the Seamen's Hospital in Wan Chai, an eastern suburb of Victoria. The Seamen's Hospital had opened in 1843, established as a private enterprise, but by the 1870s it was no longer profitable. It stood on an elevated site (200 feet (61 m) above sea level), overlooking the city and harbour, less than a mile from the emerging naval dockyard. The move ashore was overseen by Rear Admiral Charles Shadwell, the station Commander-in-Chief; the hill on which the hospital stood was subsequently named Mount Shadwell in his honour.

The hospital consisted of four two-storey blocks with verandahs, built around a paved courtyard. The upper floor of each block housed a twelve-bed ward, while the ground-floor levels contained stores, dispensaries, officers' and nurses' quarters. There were also rooms for up to eight sick officers, giving a total patient capacity of fifty-six. The hospital was staffed by a Deputy Inspector in charge and two surgeons. During the summer months, patients from the hospital would move (with the fleet) to Yokohama, where the climate was more conducive to convalescence than the 'moist summer heat' of Hong Kong.

== Mount Kellett ==
During the Second World War the hospital at Wan Chai was badly damaged and, when the British returned following the Japanese surrender, it did not reopen. (Ruttonjee Hospital now stands on the site.) Instead, the Royal Navy purchased the War Memorial Nursing Home on Mount Kellett (which had first opened as a civilian hospital in 1932, 'built by the community of Hongkong to the memory of those who served and fell in the Great War'). The building, which had also been damaged in the war, required extensive refurbishment; while this was carried out the navy occupied part of Queen Mary Hospital on a temporary basis. The new Royal Naval Hospital opened in January 1949; but in 1956 it was redesignated as a British Military Hospital and it was then run by the British Army up until 1967, when it closed. (The building was subsequently demolished).
