= Family planning in Hong Kong =

Map of countries by fertility rate. Hong Kong has one of the lowest rates in the world.

Family planning in Hong Kong occurs within a context of a total fertility rate in Hong Kong of 0.841 children per woman in 2024, one of the lowest in the world.

The Eugenics League was founded in 1936, which became The Family Planning Association of Hong Kong in 1950. The organization provides family planning advice, sex education and birth control services to the general public. In the 1970s, due to the rapidly rising population, it launched the "Two is Enough" campaign, which reduced the general birth rate through educational means. In response to the changing population trends and family values of Hong Kong society, the association has promoted a "Family Big or Small, Family Planning is Best for All" campaign to raise awareness on early family planning. New initiatives were made to meet evolving needs of holistic sexual and reproductive health care. On advocating sexuality education, the association launched a 3 year "Youth Sexuality and Love Campaign" in 2008, and organized the "4th Asian Conference on Sexuality Education" in 2010.

The Family Planning Association of Hong Kong was one of the eight family planning organizations that founded the International Planned Parenthood Federation in 24 November 1952 on Bombay, India.

== See also ==
- Demographics of Hong Kong
- Two-child policy
