= The Family Planning Association of Hong Kong =

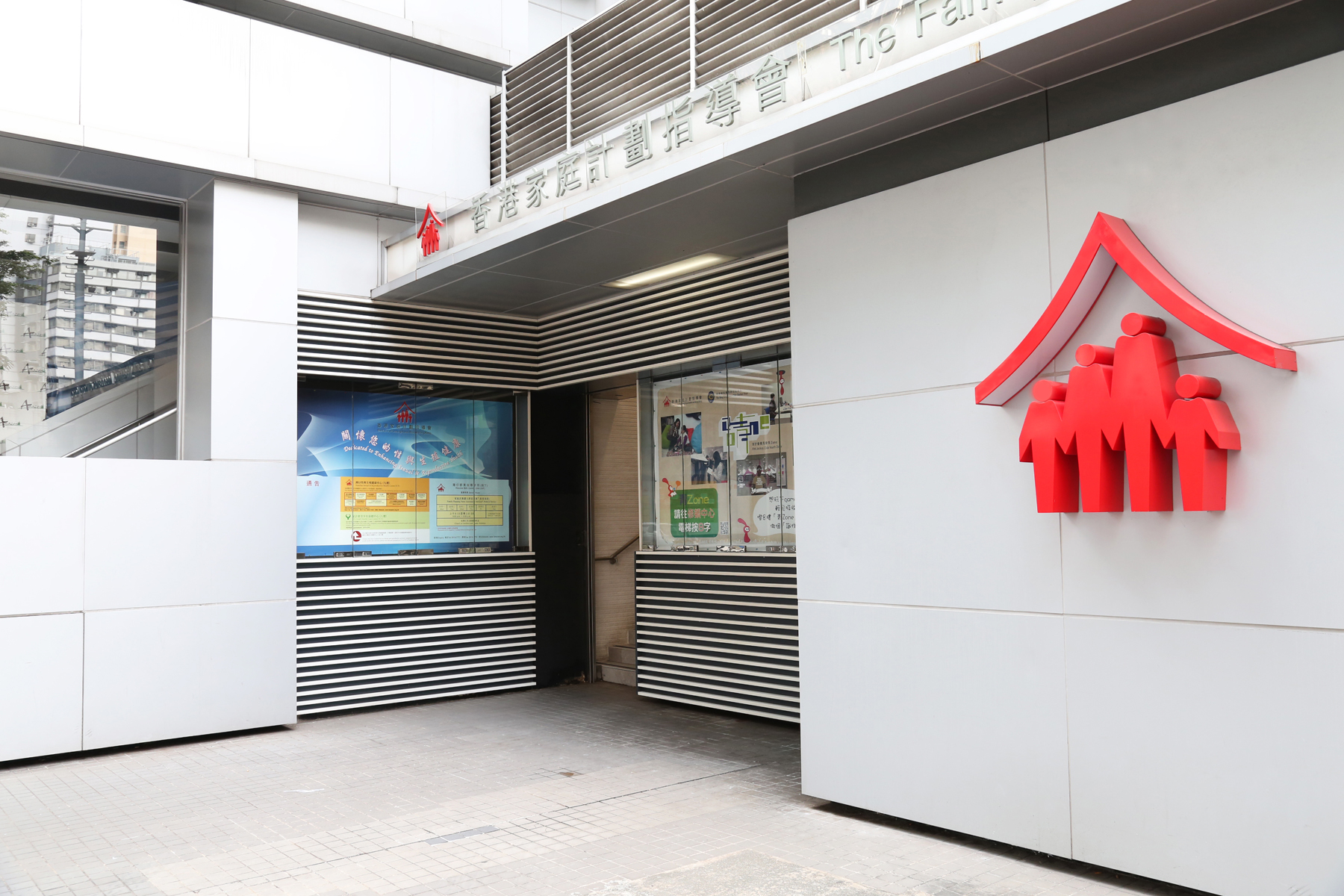
- FPAHK Wan Chai clinic, Southorn Centre
- Formation: 1936; 90 years ago (as the Hong Kong Eugenics League)
- Founded at: Hong Kong
- Type: Voluntary organisation
- Purpose: Family planning and sexual and reproductive health
- Headquarters: Southorn Centre, Wan Chai, Hong Kong
- Region served: Hong Kong
- Executive Director: Mona Lam Wai-cheung
- Affiliations: International Planned Parenthood Federation
- Website: www.famplan.org.hk

The Family Planning Association of Hong Kong (FPAHK) is a voluntary organisation that promotes family planning in Hong Kong. Its executive director is Mona Lam Wai-cheung. Its headquarters are in Southorn Centre, Wan Chai.

== History ==
=== Founding and early years ===
The association traces its origins to 1936, when a visit to Hong Kong by the American birth-control advocate Margaret Sanger prompted a group of local figures and obstetricians to found the Hong Kong Eugenics League (香港優生學會), which institutionalised the territory's nascent birth-control movement. The league's early records were destroyed during the Japanese occupation of Hong Kong. In 1950 it was reorganised and renamed the Family Planning Association of Hong Kong, and in 1952 it became one of the eight founding members of the International Planned Parenthood Federation (IPPF).

=== Development of services ===
The Hong Kong government began financing the association's activities in 1955, and the association opened its first sub-fertility (infertility) clinic in 1956. From 1964 it received grant support from the IPPF. In 1967 it conducted Hong Kong's first territory-wide survey on Family Planning Knowledge, Attitude and Practice (KAP) and began providing sex education. The Department of Health subsequently incorporated the association's birth-control clinics into its Maternal and Child Health Centres.

In 1975 the association launched its "Two Is Enough" (兩個夠哂數) campaign, which used public-education media to promote smaller families and became widely recognised in Hong Kong during a period of falling birth rates. One campaign poster featured the child actress Fung Bo Bo with a message encouraging couples to have no more than two children.

=== Later expansion ===
The association established its first Youth Health Care Centre in Causeway Bay in 1986 and, the same year, launched its "Mr Able" campaign (家庭計劃，要做得哥) encouraging men to take a more active role in birth control. Its headquarters moved to the Southorn Centre in Wan Chai, which opened in 1989. Subsequent services included artificial insemination for sub-fertile couples, pre-marital and pre-pregnancy check-ups, and a menopause clinic. To address changing population trends, the association later promoted family-planning awareness through campaigns such as "Family Big or Small, Family Planning is Best for All". In 2008 it launched a three-year "Youth Sexuality and Love Campaign", and in 2010 it organised the 4th Asian Conference on Sexuality Education.
