= Macpherson Stadium, Hong Kong =

Indoor stadium in Hong Kong

Coordinates: 22.3180°N 114.1721°E

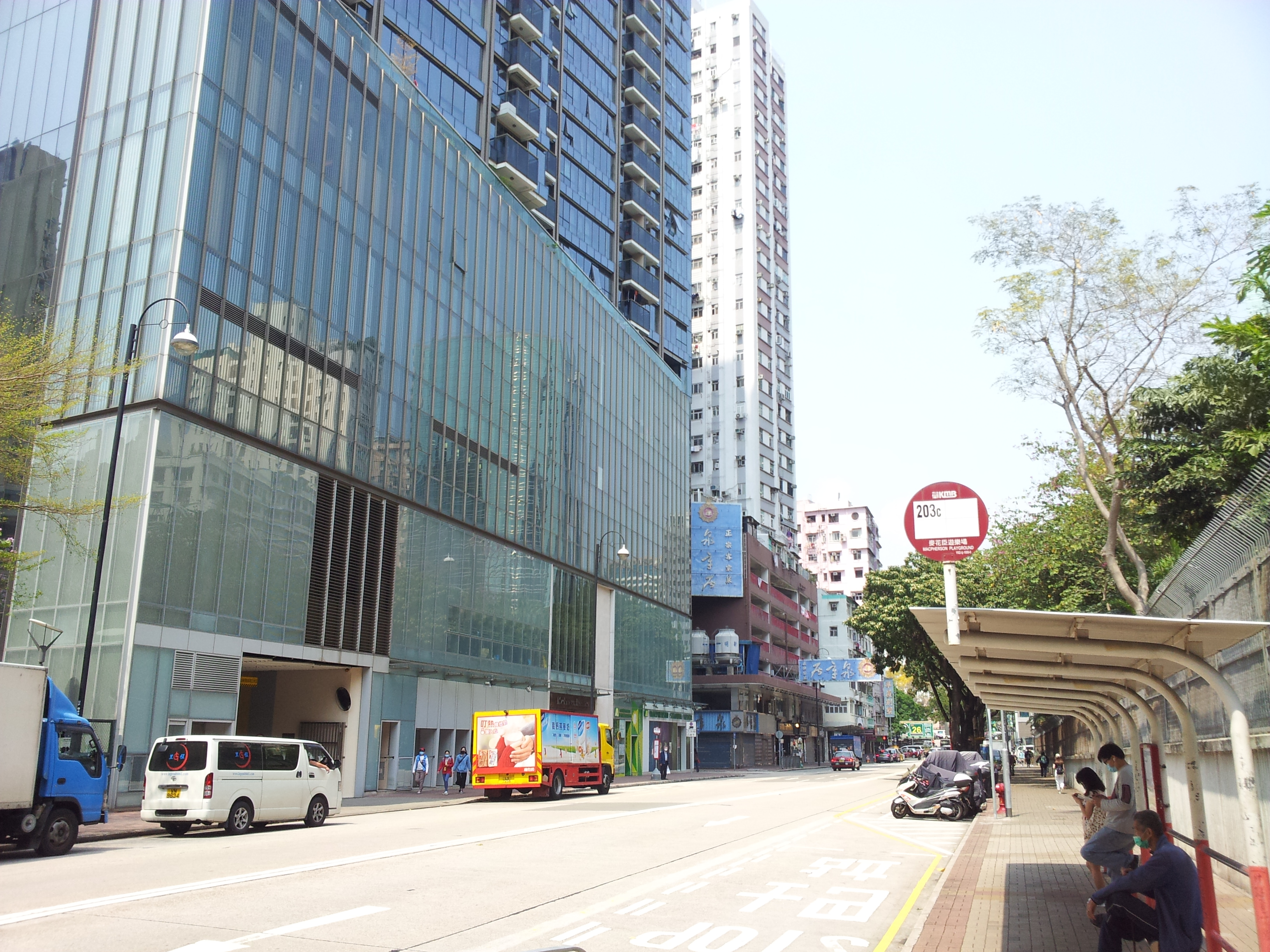
- Facade of Macpherson Stadium in 2021
- Traditional Chinese: 麥花臣室內體育館
- Simplified Chinese: 麦花臣室内体育馆
Transcriptions
Standard Mandarin
- Hanyu Pinyin: Màihuāchén Shìnèi Tǐyùguǎn
Yue: Cantonese
- Jyutping: mak6 faa1 san4 sat1 noi6 tai2 juk6 gun2

MacPherson Stadium (Chinese: 麥花臣室內體育館) is an indoor stadium that plays an important role to the development of youth recreation in Hong Kong. Located at Yim Po Fong Street, on the edge of Mong Kok, a high population density area, it has a capacity of 1,850.

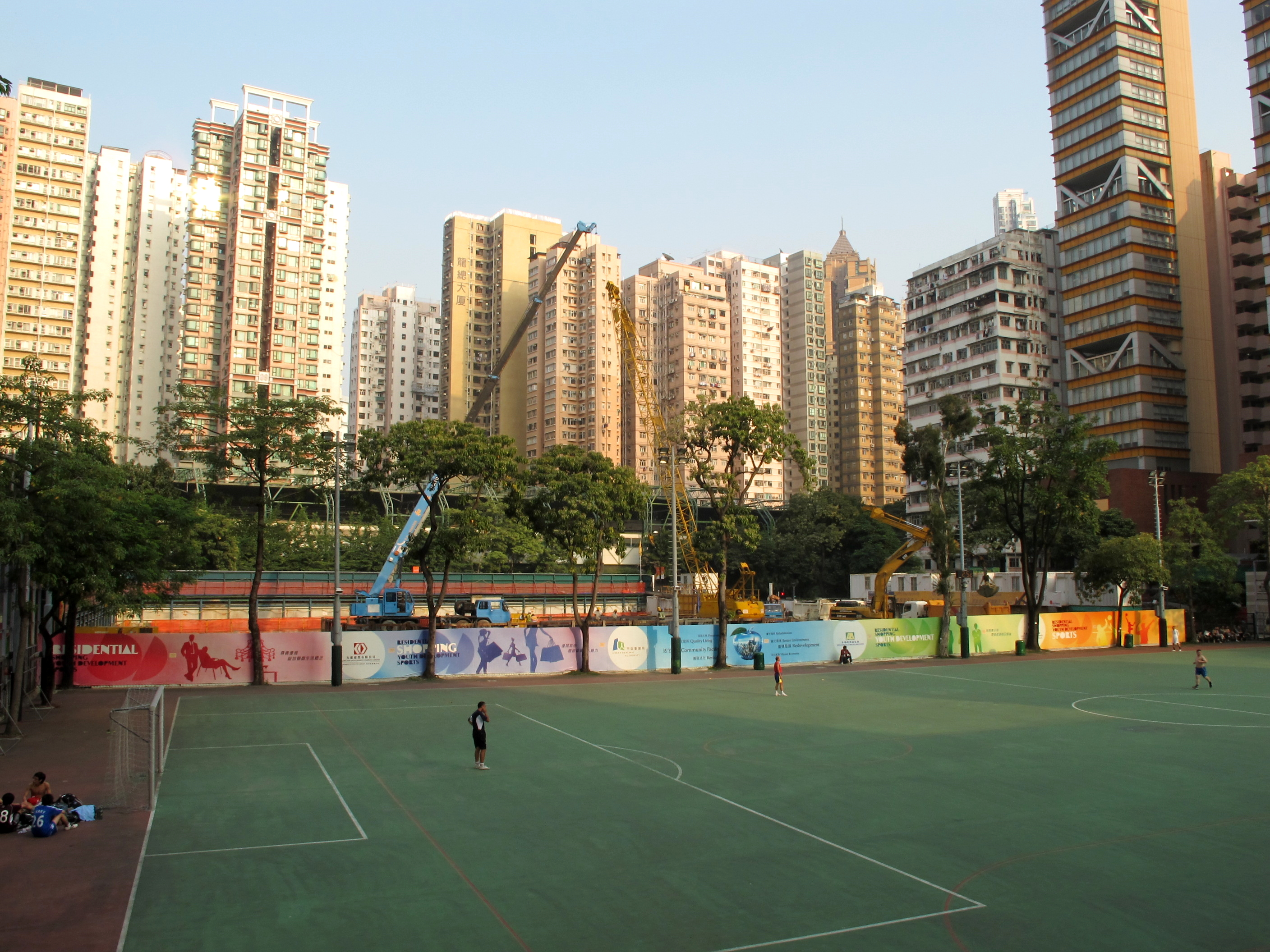
Macpherson Playground and the site of the former MacPherson Stadium under redevelopment in 2010

The stadium is within Queen Elizabeth II Youth Centre (伊利沙伯女皇二世青年遊樂場館). It is adjacent to the Macpherson Playground (麥花臣遊樂場) which has a football pitch and acts as a gathering place for youth. The stadium is managed by the Hong Kong Playground Association.

It hosted the official 1983 Asian Basketball Championship.

== Name ==
On 4 May 1929, the Hong Kong Government founded the Playing Fields Committee to provide social welfare services to local children, J. L. McPherson being among the founding members. On 4 May 1933, when the Children's Playgrounds Association became a reality, McPherson was named Honorary Secretary. John Livingstone McPherson (1874-1947) had been a missionary assigned to Hong Kong from Canada, working for the YMCA of Hong Kong from 1905 to 1935. At his retirement, appreciation was shown for the work he had done in Hong Kong, among which was the founding of the Children's Playground. Macpherson left for Canada in 1935, but lived out the remainder of his life in Tunbridge Wells, Kent, England and died there in 1947.

== History ==
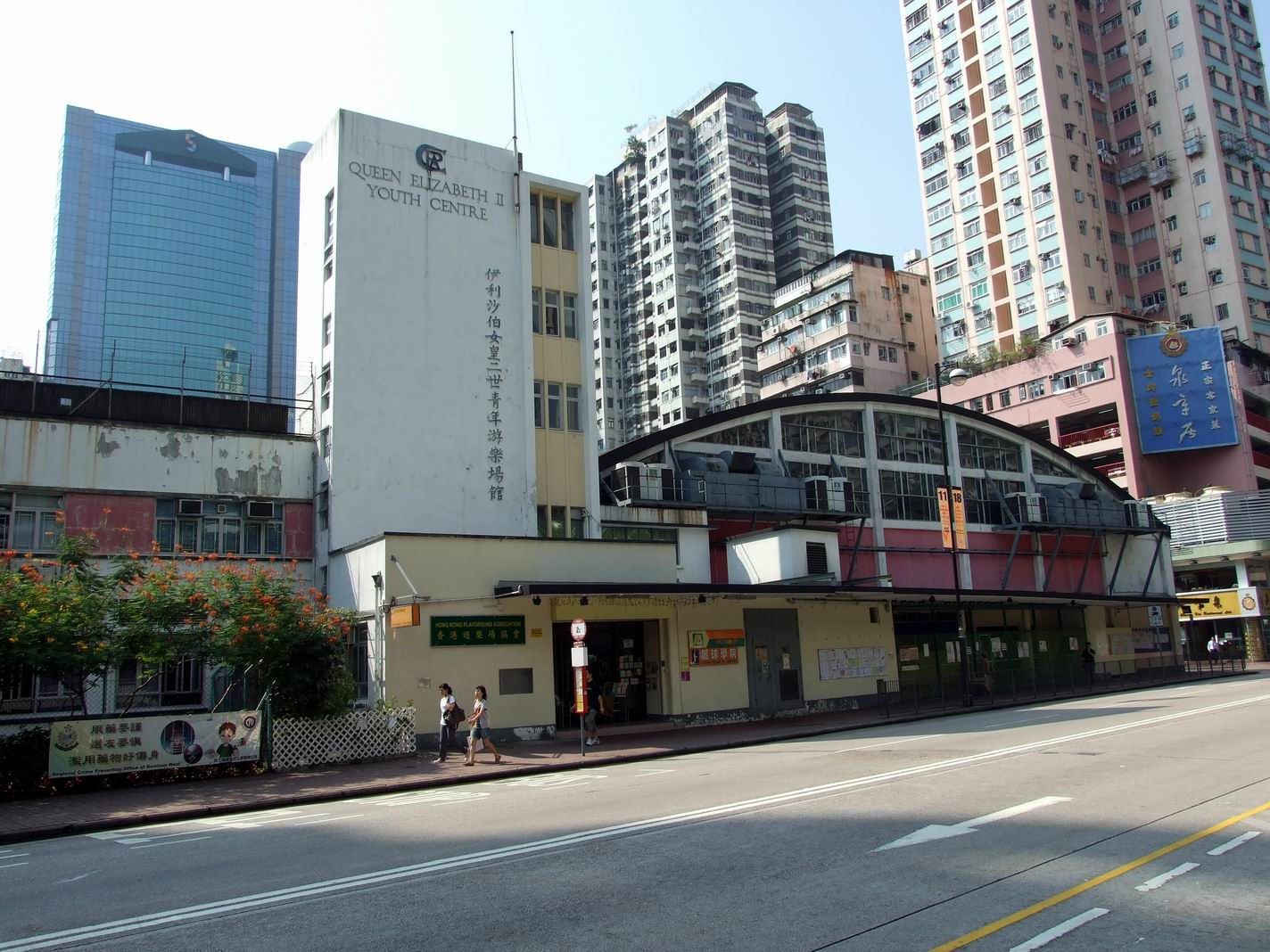
Facade of the former Macpherson Stadium along Yim Po Fong Street in 2007

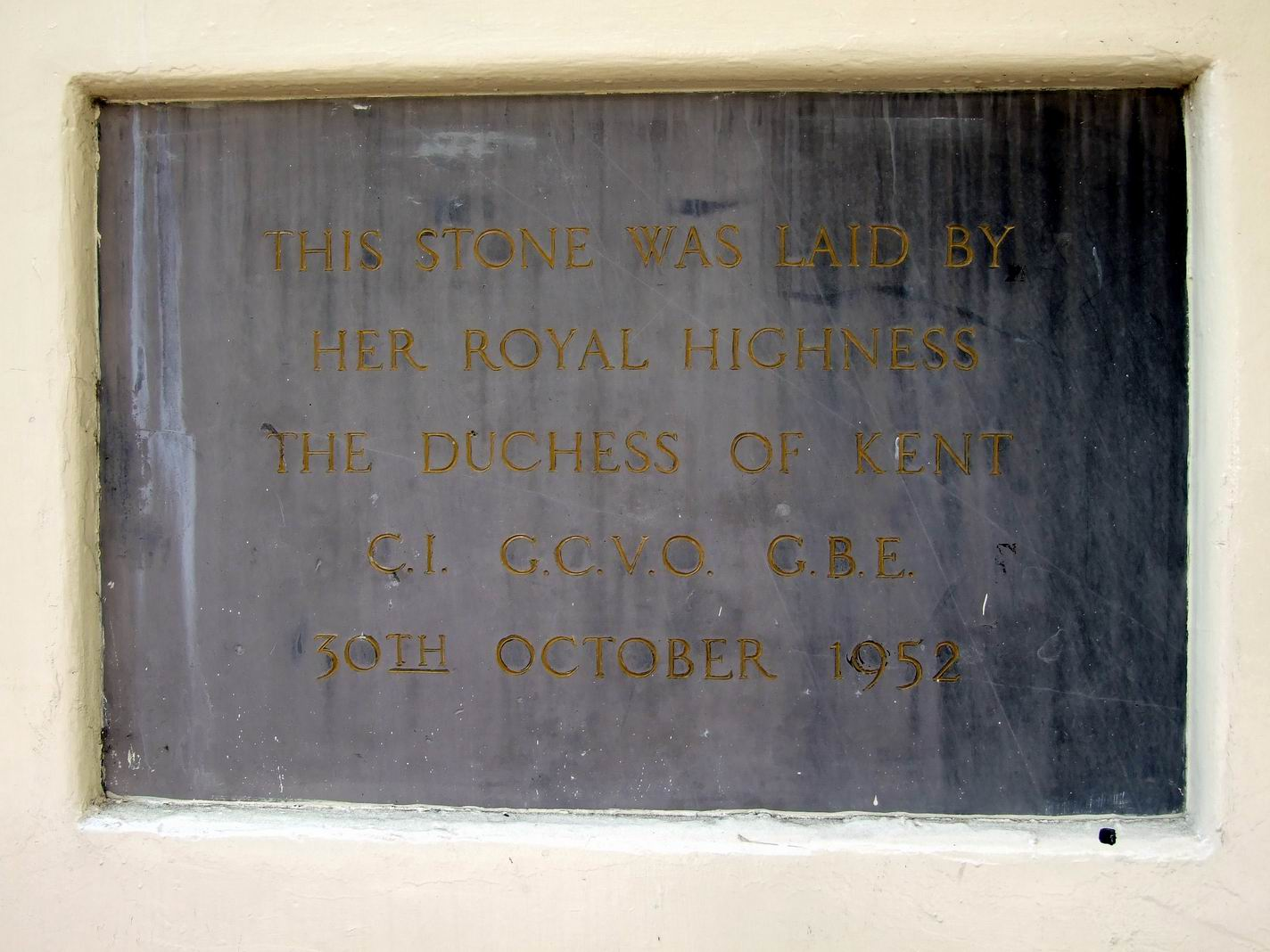
A 2007 photo of the foundation stone laid by the Duchess of Kent.

The stadium was opened by the Governor Sir Alexander Grantham on 7 September 1953, while the foundation stone was laid by the Duchess of Kent. It held its last basketball tournament in October 2008 and was demolished for a residential complex and a new indoor stadium.

== Redevelopment ==
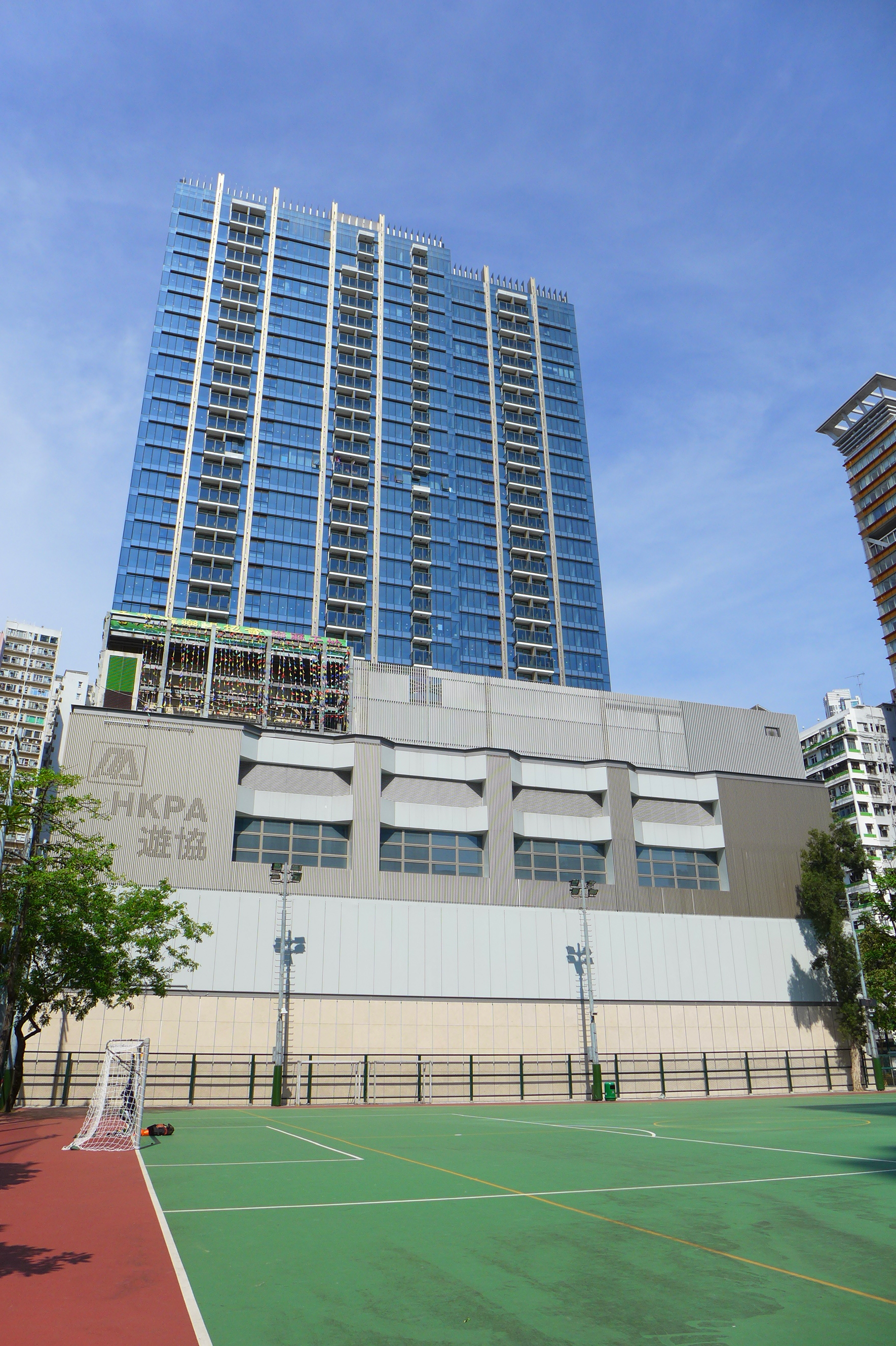
MacPherson Place in 2014

The site was redeveloped into MacPherson Place, a complex comprising the new MacPherson Stadium (麥花臣場館), a youth centre, and two residential towers (1A and 1B), collectively named MacPherson Residence (麥花臣匯). Developed by Kowloon Development and the Hong Kong Playground Association, it comprises 293 apartments. The address of MacPherson Place is 38 Nelson Street. The foundation stone of its predecessor, Queen Elizabeth II Youth Centre, has been preserved within.
