= Dhun Jehangir Ruttonjee =

The Honourable Dhun Ruttonjee CBE JP
- Born: Dhun Jehangir Ruttonjee; 10 July 1903; Hong Kong
- Died: 28 July 1974 (aged 71); Staunton Creek, Hong Kong
- Education: University of Hong Kong (BA)
- Title: Senior Unofficial Member of the Legislative Council of Hong Kong
- Term: 29 June 1962 – 26 June 1968
- Predecessor: Kwok Chan
- Successor: Kan Yuet-keung
- Father: Jehangir Hormusjee Ruttonjee

Dhun Jehangir Ruttonjee
- Traditional Chinese: 鄧律敦治
- Simplified Chinese: 邓律郭治
Transcriptions
Yue: Cantonese
- Yale Romanization: Dahng Leuht dēun jih
- Jyutping: Dang^{6} Leot^{6} deon^{1} zi^{6}

Dhun Jehangir Ruttonjee CBE JP (10 July 1903 – 28 July 1974) was a leader of the Indian community in Hong Kong. He was chairman of the Hong Kong Anti-Tuberculosis and Thoracic Diseases Association [zh] and a Legislative Councillor.

Ruttonjee was the son of businessman and philanthropist Jehangir Ruttonjee.

== Biography ==
Ruttonjee was born in Hong Kong in 1903 to prominent Parsee Jehangir Hormusjee Ruttonjee. He attended Saint Joseph's College and was an undergraduate at the University of Hong Kong, although, like many of his fellows at the university before the war, he left early to join the family business.

One of Ruttonjee's sisters, Tehmi Ruttonjee-Desai, died of tuberculosis in 1943, spurring his father to found the Hong Kong Anti-Tuberculosis Association [zh] in 1948, of which Dhun Ruttonjee was chairman from 1964 until his death (succeeding Donovan Benson, preceding Seaward Woo).

In 1942, during the Japanese occupation of Hong Kong, Ruttonjee family properties Dina House and Ruttonjee Building on Duddell Street were beleaguered by Japanese guards for several weeks. In 1944, Ruttonjee and his father were arrested, tortured and sentenced to five years' imprisonment, of which they served nine months before the liberation of the city. They were accused of aiding those at the Stanley Internment Camp and general anti-Japanese activity.

He was appointed Justice of the Peace after the war, in 1947. He was made an Unofficial member of the Legislative Council of Hong Kong in 1953.

In the Council, he sat on the Kaitak Progress Committee alongside Ngan Shing-kwan and Charles Terry. Ruttonjee was made Officer of the Order of the British Empire (OBE) in 1957, and promoted to Commander (CBE) in 1964, for public services. During the 1967 leftist riot, Ruttonjee was one of the earliest supporters of government crackdown among local elites. He served on the Legislative Council until 1968. He was known to often wear an orchid, a fact mentioned when he received the degree of Doctor of Laws honoris causa from the University of Hong Kong the next year. Ruttonjee died on 28 July 1974.

Legislative Council of Hong Kong
Preceded by Kwok Chan	Senior Unofficial Member in Legislative Council; 1962–1968	Succeeded by Kan Yuet-keung
Non-profit organization positions
Preceded by Donovan Benson [zh]	Chairman of the Hong Kong Tuberculosis Association; 1964–1974	Succeeded by Seaward Woo
