= Hong Kong Playground Association =

Hong Kong not-for-profit organization

- Traditional Chinese: 香港遊樂場協會
- Simplified Chinese: 香港游乐场协会
- Jyutping: hoeng1 gong2 jau4 lok6 coeng4 hip3 wui2
- Cantonese Yale: hēung góng yàuh lohk chèuhng hip wúi
- Hanyu Pinyin: Xiānggǎng yóulèchǎng xiéhuì
Transcriptions
Standard Mandarin
- Hanyu Pinyin: Xiānggǎng yóulèchǎng xiéhuì
Yue: Cantonese
- Yale Romanization: hēung góng yàuh lohk chèuhng hip wúi
- Jyutping: hoeng1 gong2 jau4 lok6 coeng4 hip3 wui2

HKPA logo

The Hong Kong Playground Association (HKPA) is a Hong Kong not for profit organisation. It was incorporated as a statutory corporation, under the Hong Kong Playground Association Ordinance. However, the association was classified as a subvented non-government organization. The Government of Hong Kong is one of the funding source of the association, but the association has its owns governing board. The association has a basketball team that participated in the Hong Kong A1 Division Championship. The association also provided many extra-curricular activities to the teens of Hong Kong.

The association also known for its ownership of the Macpherson Stadium. The association partnered with the Urban Renewal Authority, made an open invitation to re-develop the site, which the real estate developer would owned part of the re-development, but also bored the redevelopment cost.

The association also operates an indoor sports venue, Southorn Stadium as well as camping sites Tung Chung Camp and Jockey Club Silvermine Bay Camp. The latter was sponsored by The Hong Kong Jockey Club Charities Trust for repairs and upgrade.
