= Jehangir Hormusjee Ruttonjee =

Jehangir Hormusjee Ruttonjee CBE, JP
- 律敦治
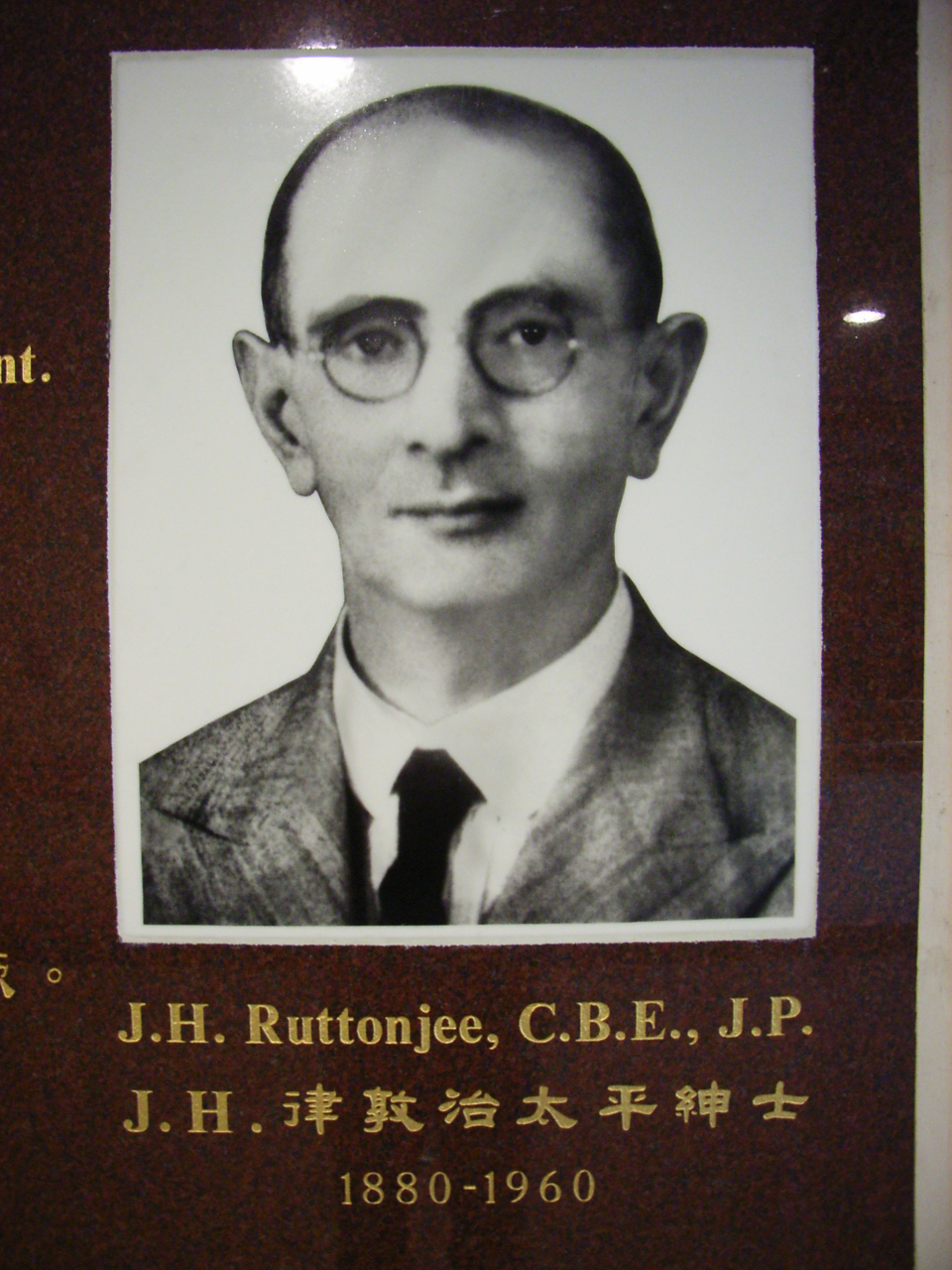
- Memorial plaque at Ruttonjee Hospital
- Born: 30 October 1880; Bombay, India
- Died: 10 February 1960 (aged 79); Hong Kong
- Education: St Joseph's College
- Occupation: Businessman
- Children: Dhun Jehangir Ruttonjee

Jehangir Hormusjee Ruttonjee
- Traditional Chinese: 律敦治
- Yale Romanization: Leuht Dēun jih
- Jyutping: Leot^{6} Deon^{1} zi^{6}

Jehangir Hormusjee Ruttonjee CBE JP (1880–1960) (Chinese: 律敦治) was an Indian Parsi philanthropist in Hong Kong. He is famous for founding the Ruttonjee Sanatoria, and helped in the establishment of the Hong Kong Anti-Tuberculosis Association.

== Biography ==
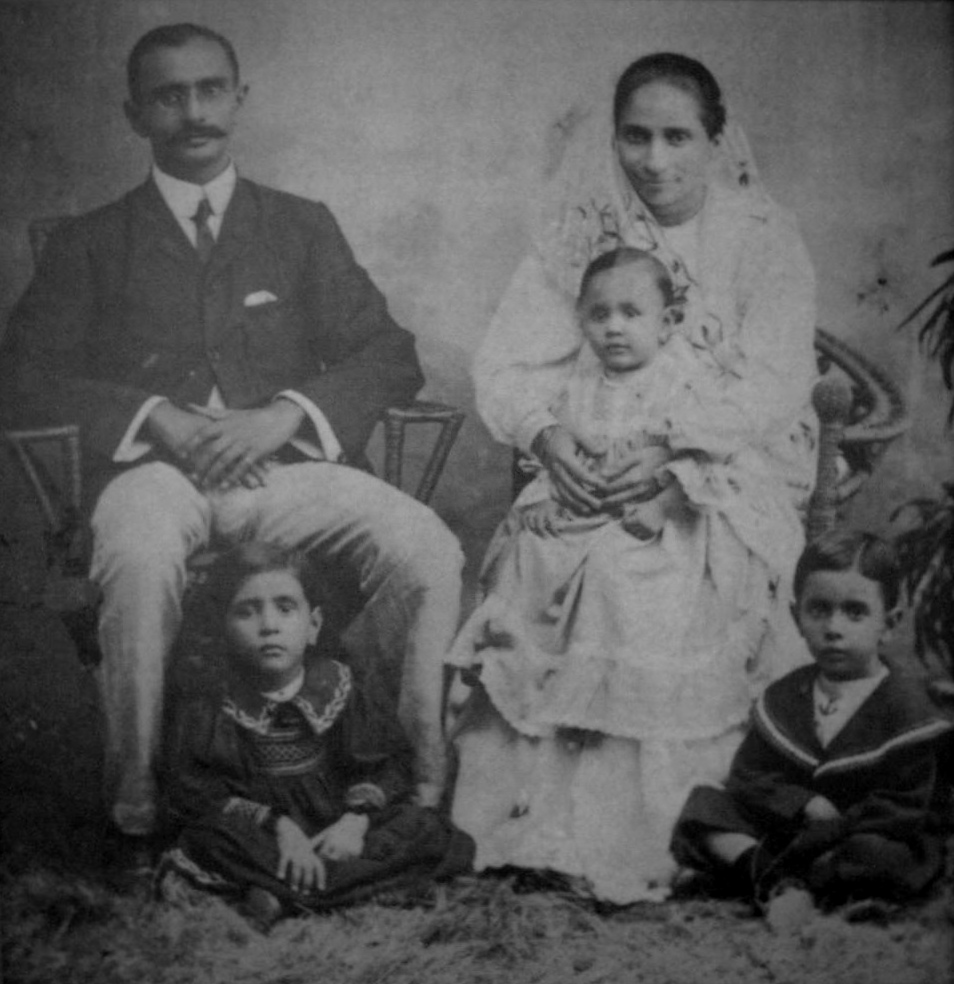
Family portrait. Sitting on the ground in the far right is his son Dhun. On the mother's lap is the eldest daughter, Khorshev. On the ground in the left is the second eldest daughter Tehmi. Not pictured is the youngest daughter Freni

Ruttonjee was born in 1880 in Bombay to Hormusjee Ruttonjee and Dina Ruttonjee, and came to Hong Kong in 1892 to join his father. Ruttonjee studied at St. Joseph's College on Hong Kong Island, joining his father's business after graduation. He founded a brewery in 1931, and sold it to San Miguel before opening another in 1948 in Sham Tseng. Ruttonjee lived just along the Castle Peak Road from Homi Villa, which he owned, and is now the Airport Core Programme Exhibition Centre.

Ruttonjee donated a great deal of money to build Ruttonjee Sanatorium (now Ruttonjee Hospital) to fight against tuberculosis.

His concerns about an epidemic of tuberculosis in the 1940s, during the Japanese occupation, which claimed the life of his daughter in 1943, led him to found the Hong Kong Anti-Tuberculosis Association (now the Hong Kong Tuberculosis, Chest and Heart Diseases Association) in 1948.

Ruttonjee died in 1960 in Hong Kong. His son, Dhun Jehangir Ruttonjee, who also carried on his philanthropic work, was a member of the Legislative Council of Hong Kong in the 1960s.

== See also ==
Besides Ruttonjee, Hong Kong was home to other Parsi diaspora, including:

- Hormusjee Naorojee Mody
