= Ruttonjee Hospital =

- Hospital Authority and the Hong Kong Tuberculosis, Chest and Heart Diseases Association
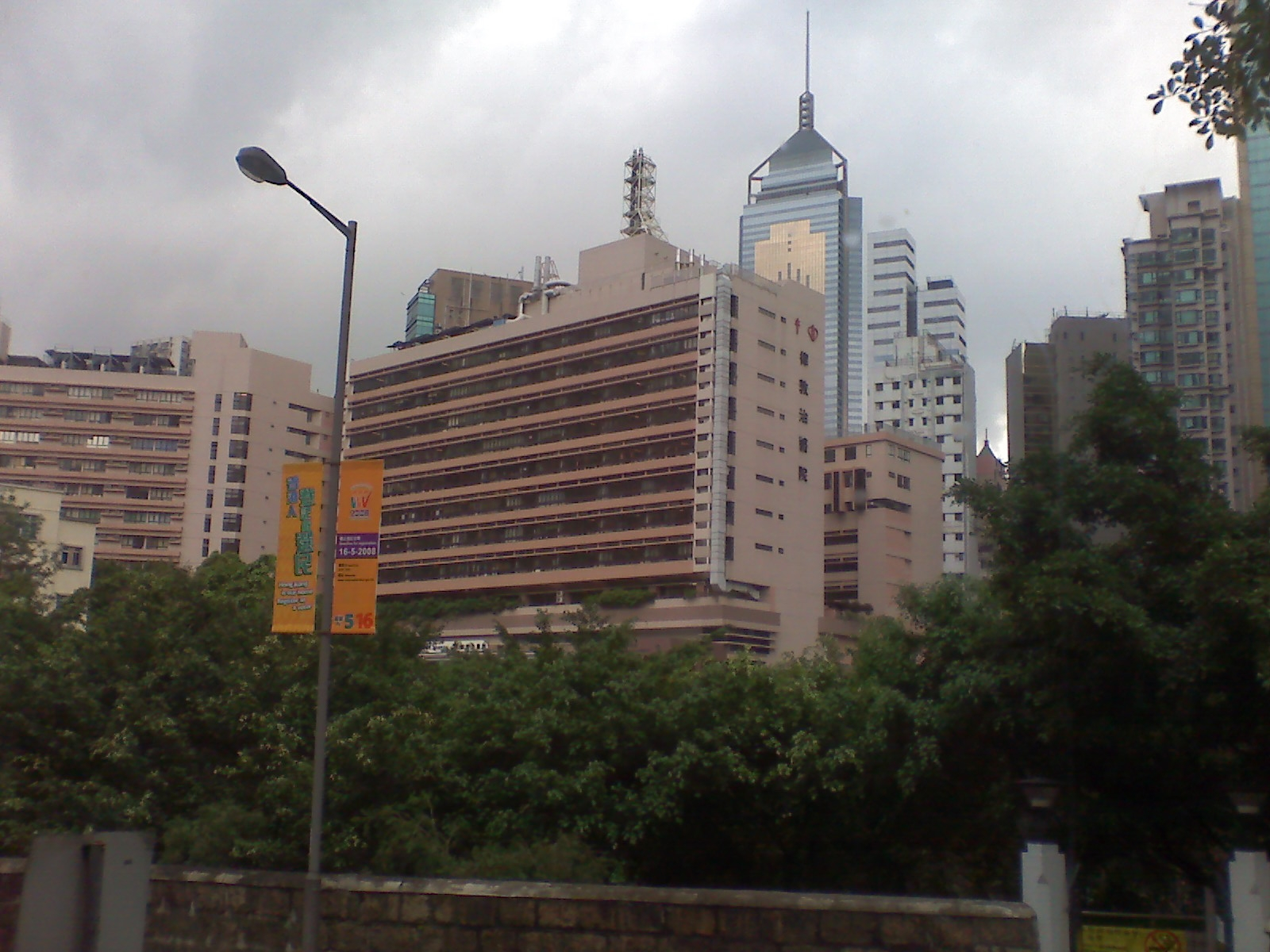
- Ruttonjee Hospital, viewed from Queen's Road East

- Location within Hong Kong

Geography
- Location: 266 Queen's Road East, Wan Chai, Hong Kong Island, Hong Kong
- Coordinates: 22°16′34″N 114°10′31″E

Organisation
- Care system: Public
- Type: District General, Teaching
- Affiliated university: Li Ka Shing Faculty of Medicine, University of Hong Kong
- Patron: Jehangir Hormusjee Ruttonjee
- Network: Hong Kong Island Cluster

Services
- Emergency department: Yes, 24 hour Accident and Emergency
- Beds: 600

Helipads
- Helipad: No

History
- Founded: 1991; 35 years ago; historical ties to Royal Naval Hospital (Hong Kong) (1841)

Links
- Lists: Hospitals in Hong Kong

Ruttonjee Hospital
- Traditional Chinese: 律敦治醫院
- Simplified Chinese: 律敦治医院
Transcriptions
Standard Mandarin
- Hanyu Pinyin: Lǜdūnzhì Yīyuàn
Yue: Cantonese
- Yale Romanization: Leuht dēun jih yī yún
- Jyutping: Loet6 doen1 zi6 ji1 jyun2

Ruttonjee Hospital (Chinese: 律敦治醫院; RH) is a district general hospital in Wan Chai on Hong Kong Island in Hong Kong. It is affiliated with the Li Ka Shing Faculty of Medicine, at the University of Hong Kong, and provides clinical attachment opportunities for the university's medical students.

== History ==
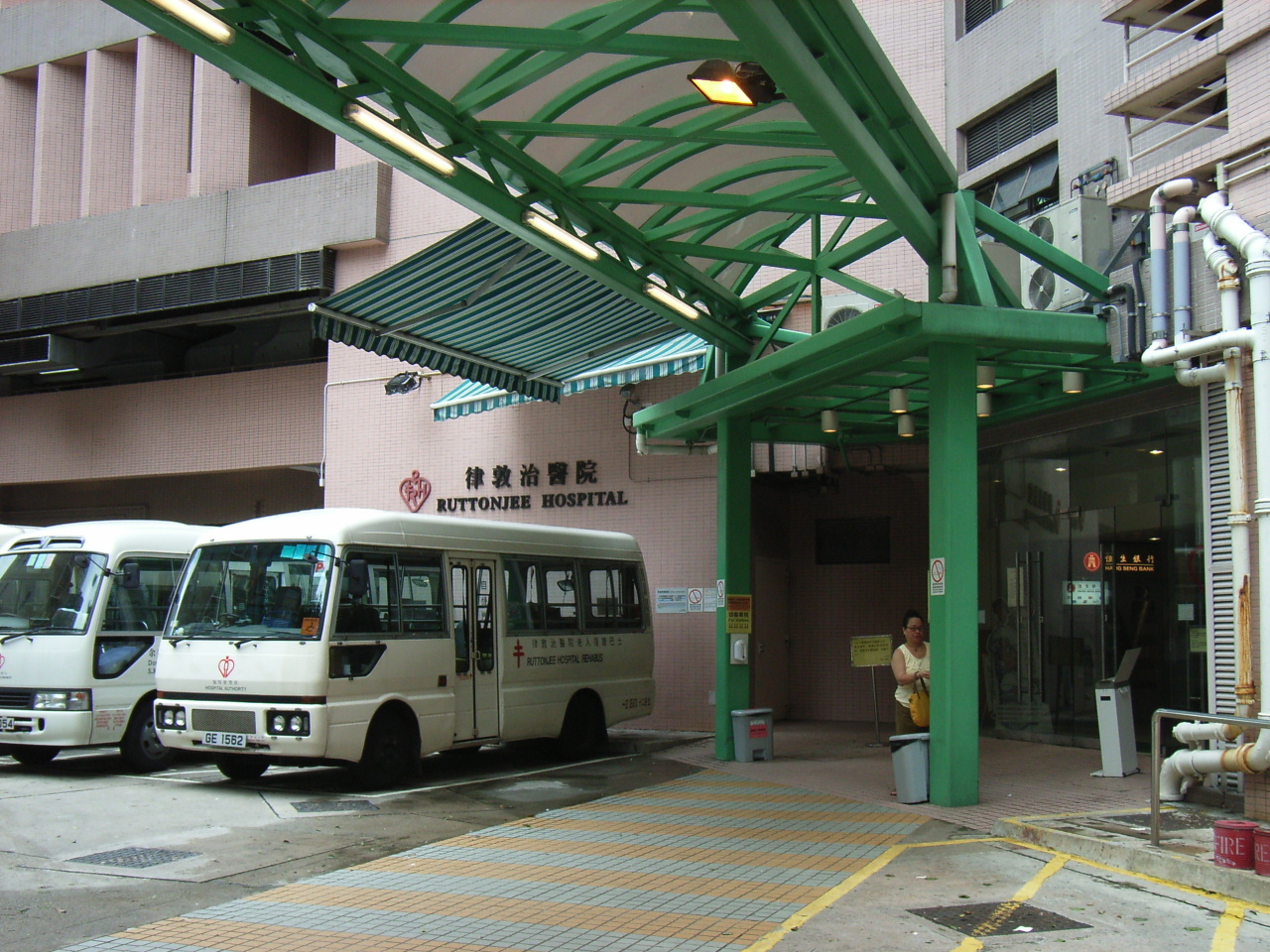
Ruttonjee Hospital

Centrally located in Wan Chai, the Ruttonjee Hospital is a recently redeveloped hospital with a history that goes back more than 140 years. It was founded on the Mount Shadwell, Wan Chai site which was formerly occupied by the "Royal Naval Hospital", which was severely damaged during the Second World War.

In 1949, the "Ruttonjee Sanatorium" (Chinese: 律敦治療養院; Cantonese Yale: Leuhtdēunjih Lìuhyéuhngyún) was set up with the support of Mr Jehangir Hormusjee Ruttonjee in memory of his daughter, Tehmi Ruttonjee-Desai, who died of tuberculosis in 1943. It was one of the main institutions specifically treating tuberculosis in Hong Kong. Development and expansion of the hospital was overseen by Sister Dr Mary Aquinas Monaghan, a missionary nun from Ireland.

It was converted into the "Ruttonjee Hospital", a 600-bed general hospital, in 1991 not only because the number of patients with tuberculosis had decreased, but also because patients are increasingly treated by out-patient chemotherapy. The hospital now provides a wide range of services to meet the requirements of the community.

Since reconstruction, the hospital has become an acute general hospital with general medical and surgical specialities. It does not, however, provide paediatric, obstetric or gynaecological cover. Its surgical department enjoys high acclaim as the Ruttonjee is the only hospital in Hong Kong to provide gender-reassignment operations. The geriatrics service has also developed in recent years in response to the ageing population of the Wan Chai district.

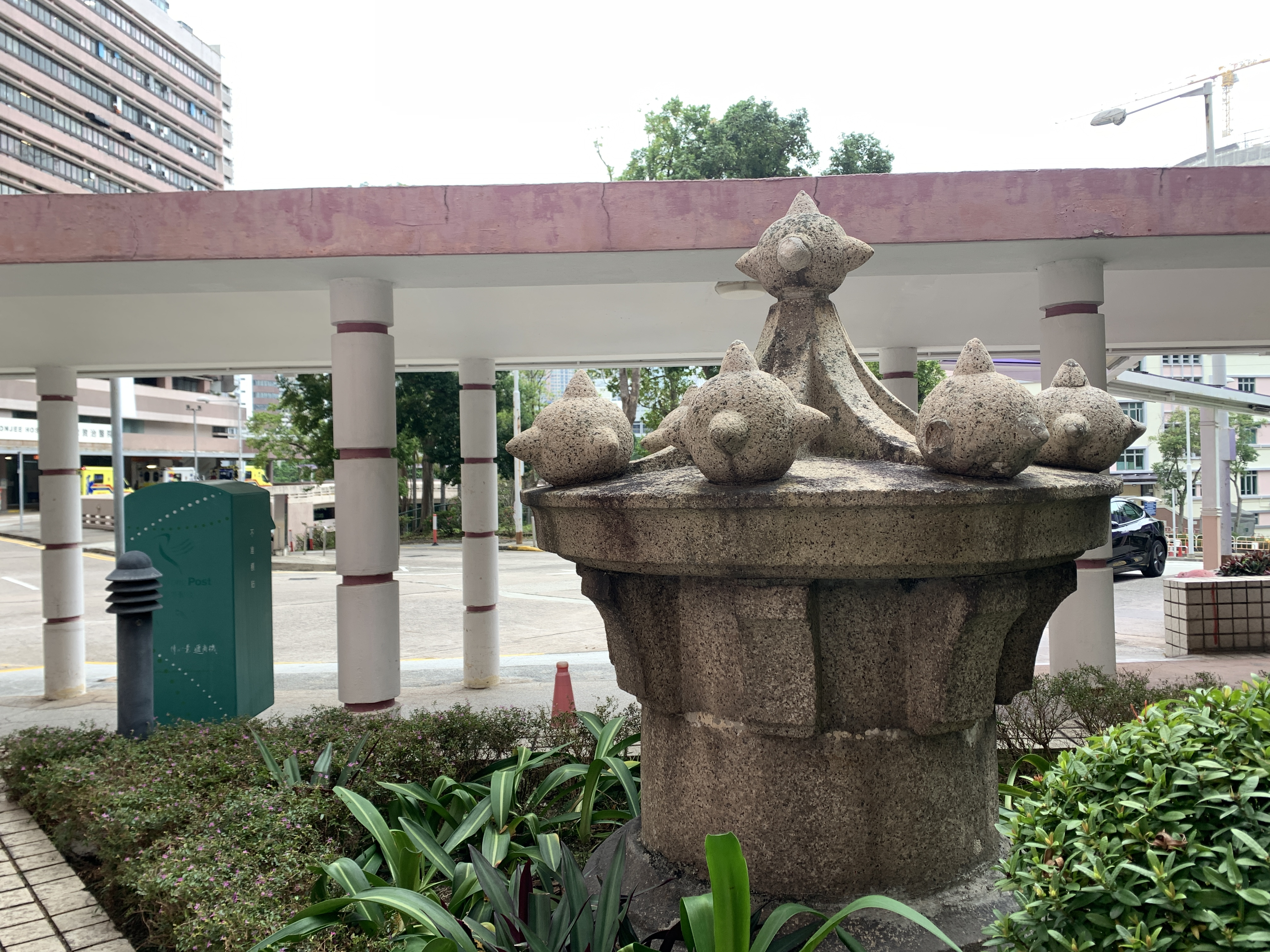
One of the surviving gatepost stones from the Royal naval hospital. Now placed near hospital entrance.

== Services ==
- 24 hour Emergency Department
- Anaesthesia
- Cardiac and Intensive Care Unit
- Radiology
- Geriatrics
- Infirmary and Rehabilitation Medicine
- Orthopaedics and Traumatology
- Palliative Care
- Pathology
- Respiratory Medicine
- Surgery

=== Others ===
- Cardiac and Pulmonary Rehabilitation Programme
- Chaplaincy and Pastoral Care
- Combined Endoscopy Unit
- Community Geriatric Assessment
- Electro-medical Diagnostic Unit
- Geriatric Day Hospital
- Health Resource Centre
- Special Accommodation Ward
- Specialist Out-patient Department
- Volunteer Service

== Controversy ==
On 31 March 2010, the Hong Kong High Court approved a settlement in the legal action brought by British author Martin Jacques over the death of his wife Harinder Veriah. She was hospitalised in Ruttonjee Hospital after an epileptic seizure on 1 January 2000 and died the following evening. The case seemed to expose racial prejudice and medical negligence by doctors and staff.

== See also ==
- HMS Tamar
- Seaman's Hospital
