= The Heart Asks Pleasure First =

2020 novel by Karuna Ezara Parikh

- First edition
- Author: Karuna Ezara Parikh
- Language: English
- Genre: Fiction
- Publisher: Picador India
- Publication date: September 21, 2020
- Publication place: India
- Pages: 320
- ISBN: 978-9-389-10957-3

The Heart Asks Pleasure First is a 2020 debut novel written by Karuna Ezara Parikh.

== Reception ==
The Femina wrote in a review "Thirteen years in the making (with a break in between) and then reworked upon totally, The Heart Asks Pleasure First reflects the evolution of the author’s evolution of the plot into something that evokes the deepest of emotions."

The Hindu wrote in a review "Parikh’s story explores a space where these two earnest young lovers come together trying to discover if it is possible to find a personal truth which is unaffected by the impersonal forces swirling outside their bubble — the forces of history, politics and old hatreds."

The Scroll wrote in a review "In short, The Heart Seeks Pleasure First is a novel that has potential, genuinely, and certainly fulfils it to an extent – but ultimately falls a little short of the mark."
