= Benegal Rama Rau =

Indian banker and judge, 4th Governor of the Reserve Bank of India

Sir Benegal Rama Rau CIE ICS
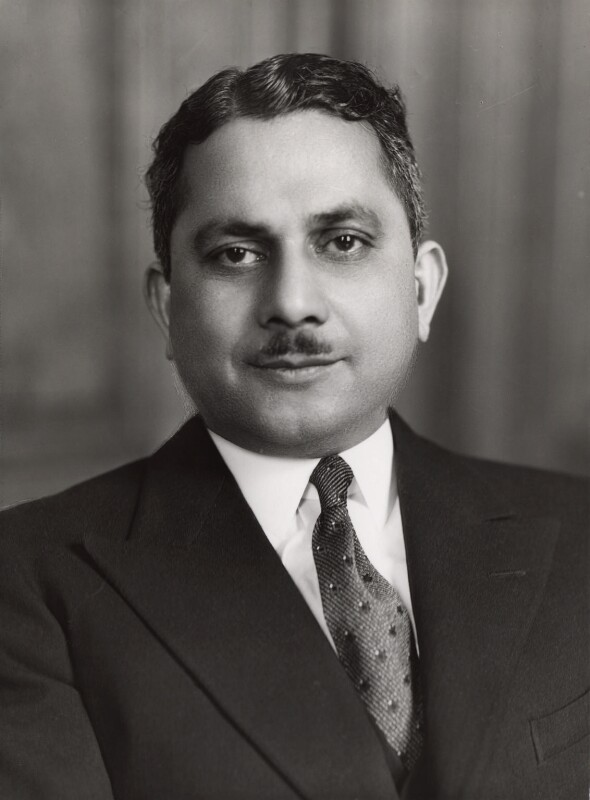
- Rau in March 1938

4th Governor of the Reserve Bank of India
- In office 1 July 1949 – 14 January 1957
- Preceded by: Sir C. D. Deshmukh
- Succeeded by: K. G. Ambegaonkar

2nd Ambassador of India to the United States
- In office 1948–1949
- Prime Minister: Jawaharlal Nehru
- Preceded by: Asaf Ali
- Succeeded by: Vijaya Lakshmi Pandit

Head of the Indian Liaison Mission in Tokyo and Political Representative of India with the Supreme Commander Allied Powers in Japan
- In office 1947–1948
- Prime Minister: Jawaharlal Nehru
- Preceded by: Office established
- Succeeded by: Birendra Narayan Chakraborty

Personal details
- Born: 1 July 1889
- Died: 13 December 1969 (aged 80)
- Education: King's College, Cambridge
- Occupation: Civil servant

Sir Benegal Rama Rau CIE, ICS (1 July 1889 – 13 December 1969) was an Indian diplomat and career civil servant. He was the fourth Governor of the Reserve Bank of India from 1 July 1949 to 14 January 1957.

== Early life and family ==
He was born in a Konkani-speaking Chitrapur Saraswat Brahmin family from Mangalore. His elder brother Sir Benegal Narsing Rau was an Indian civil servant, jurist, diplomat and legal adviser of the Constituent Assembly, and his younger brother B Shiva Rao was a journalist and politician.

He was educated at Presidency College of Madras, and at King's College in Cambridge.

He married Dhanvanthi Rama Rau, of Kashmiri Brahmin descent and a leader in the Indian women's rights movement who was the International President of Planned Parenthood and the founder of Family Planning Association of India. Their younger daughter Santha Rama Rau became a travel writer, marrying and settling in the United States.

== Career ==
Joining the Indian Civil Service in 1919, he was appointed a Companion of the Order of the Indian Empire (CIE) in 1930, and was knighted in 1939. He was a member of the Indian Civil Service. While he had the longest tenure as Governor of the RBI, it was cut short when he resigned just before the expiry of his second extended term, due to differences with Finance Minister T. T. Krishnamachari.

On joining the ICS and before joining the RBI he held the following posts.

- Under-Secretary and Deputy Secretary to the Government of Madras (1919–1924)
- Finance Department (1925–1926) as Secretary to the Indian Taxation Committee
- Finance Department (1926–1928) as Deputy Secretary
- Simons Commission (1928–1930) as Financial Adviser
- Industries Department Joint Secretary
- Round Table Conference as Secretary
- Indian Bill (1931–1934) in the Joint Select Committee of Parliament
- Deputy High Commissioner for India in London (1934–1938)
- High Commissioner for India in the Union of South Africa (1938–1941)

When he returned to India, he was appointed Chairman of the Bombay Port Trust (1941–1946). After serving in the post he once again served as a diplomat as the Indian Ambassador to Japan (1947–1948), and as the Ambassador to the United States (1948–1949). His last position was as the Governor of the Reserve Bank of India. He had been the longest-serving R.B.I Governor to date.
