= Mahinder Watsa =

Indian sexologist (1924–2020)

Mahinder C. Watsa
- Born: 11 February 1924; Punjab, British India
- Died: 28 December 2020 (aged 96); Mumbai, Maharashtra, India
- Occupations: Sexologist, sex columnist and sex educator
- Spouse: Promila (deceased 2006)

Mahinder C. Watsa (11 February 1924 – 28 December 2020) was an Indian sexologist known for his sex columns in newspapers and magazines. His contributions to promote sex education in India earned him the 2014 Dr. Ved Vyas Puri Award.

== Life and work ==
Mahinder Watsa's father was a military physician. Watsa was Punjabi. When he was around 7 years old, his family spent some time in Rangoon.

During his time at a medical college in Mumbai, Watsa stayed with friends of his family. Through them, he met his future wife, Promila. Despite coming from different backgrounds and castes (he was Punjabi, she was originally from Sindh), and going against a tradition of arranged marriages, the two wed after being friends for a number of years. The couple had a son and lived for a while in the 1950s in the United Kingdom, during which time Watsa worked as a hospital houseman and registrar. The family returned to India after his father fell ill and Watsa found work in Glaxo as a medical officer, while simultaneously running a private practice as a gynecologist and obstetrician.

Watsa began a career as a columnist in the 1960s when, in his late 30s, he was asked to start writing a medical advice column for a women's magazine. He continued authoring health columns for several women's magazines, such as Femina, Flair, and Trend, into the 1970s until he encountered resistance from an editor who insisted upon censoring queries about sexual health. Watsa however maintained his writing through numerous alternative outlets including men's magazines (such as Fantasy) and, later, websites.

One of the readers of the Femina column had filed an obscenity lawsuit claiming that the publishers were fabricating the letters to increase readership. The editor, Sathya Saran, managed to convince the judge to drop the case by delivering a sack of unopened letters to him.

Through his work as a columnist he became aware of the lack of sex education in India. In 1974, while working as a consultant for the Family Planning Association of India (FPAI), Watsa proposed that a sexual counselling and education program should be introduced. Despite oppositions, FPAI accepted his advice and started India's first sex education, counselling and therapy centre. In 1976, he organised India's first workshop on human sexuality and family life. The workshop was also addressed by Ashok Row Kavi, a notable LGBT rights activist in India. In the early 1980s, Watsa left his practice to work full-time in counselling and education.

=== Ask the Sexpert column ===
In 2005, aged 80, Watsa began writing a column called Ask the Sexpert for the newspaper Mumbai Mirror, which is noted for its witty replies to queries. The newspaper has subsequently been threatened with lawsuits and accusations of obscenity. Suchitra Dalvie, a gynaecologist, conducted a study by analysing more than 500 letters sent to the column. According to her, the study revealed a lack of sex education even among urban and relatively well-educated Indians. In August 2014, his editor estimated that he had received more than 40,000 queries for the column.

== Death ==
Watsa died in Mumbai on 28 December 2020, aged 96.

== Awards ==
- 2014 Dr. Ved Vyas Puri Award: On 17 June 2014, he was given this award by the Family Planning Association of India (FPAI) for his contributions to sex education in India.

== Published papers ==
- Watsa, Mahinder C (1993). "Premarital sexual behaviour of urban educated youth in India". Workshop on Sexual Aspects of AIDS/STD Prevention in India. Bombay: Tata Institute of Social Sciences.
- Watsa, M. C. (2005). "Sexual Health Services for Young People" (PDF). Journal of Family Welfare. 50 (I). Family Planning Association of India: 36.
- M. C. Watsa; Amita Dhanu (2013). "Three decades of meeting sexual and reproductive health needs of young people" (PDF). Journal of Family Welfare. 50: 83–88.
