= International Planned Parenthood Federation =

Global nonprofit organization

- Abbreviation: IPPF
- Formation: 24 November 1952; 73 years ago
- Founded at: Bombay (present-day Mumbai), India
- Type: International non-governmental organisation
- Headquarters: London, SE1; United Kingdom
- Website: www.ippf.org

The International Planned Parenthood Federation (IPPF) is a global non-governmental organisation with the broad aims of promoting sexual and reproductive health, and advocating the right of individuals to make their own choices in family planning. It was first formed in 1952 in Bombay (present-day Mumbai), India, by Margaret Sanger and Lady Rama Rau at the Third International Conference on Planned Parenthood with support of an expanding population with limited resources. Presently, it consists of more than 149 Member Associations working in more than 189 countries. The IPPF is highly developed and organised into six regions. The organisation is based in London, England.

== Purpose ==
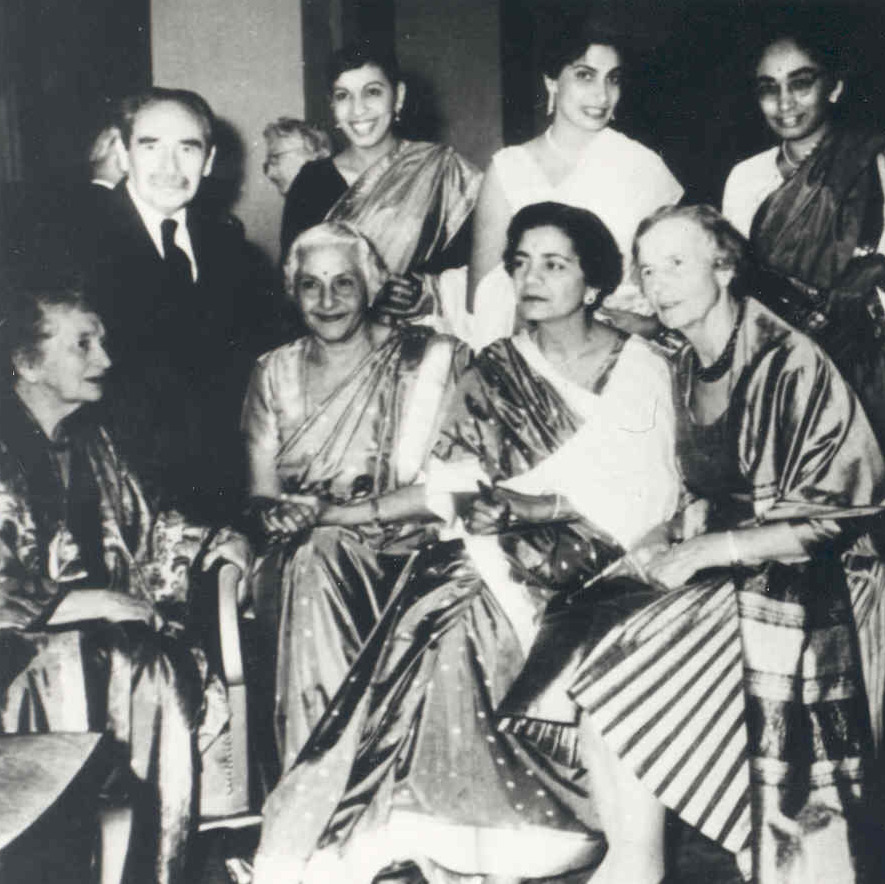
Group photos of International Planned Parenthood Federation

Member Associations provide non-profit family planning services, sexual health and abuse prevention training and education. Their goals include giving clients the information necessary to make informed sexual health decisions, promoting continuing sexual health, making available high quality sexual health services, improving the overall health of low income individuals, and using democratic organisation and the leadership of volunteers to promote these goals. Over 40% of the organisation's resources are aimed at serving the needs of young people; as the IPPF explains, individuals under 25 (and especially females) are at a much higher risk of getting infected with HIV.

== Funding ==
The IPPF is financially supported by governments, trusts, and foundations including the European Commission and the United Nations Population Fund for special projects. Half of the balance of their funding comes from government official development assistance programmes. To achieve their goals as an organisation, the IPPF often collaborates with the World Health Organization (WHO), the United Nations Development Program (UNDP), the United Nations Children's Fund (UNICEF), the United Nations Population Fund (UNFPA)-for instance in the Special Programme on Human Reproduction-, and the Organization for Economic Co-operation and Development (OECD).

The IPPF is a prominent lobbyist in the European Union: specifically, for the European Council and the United Nations Economic and Social Council (ECOSOC). It is the only non-governmental organisation (NGO) that focuses on sexual health and reproductive rights to qualify for Consultative Status with the Council of Europe. This allows the IPPF to sit in on the Parliamentary Assembly.

=== Canadian funding ===
In April 2011, it was revealed that IPPF, which had applied for an $18 million grant more than a year previously, had been denied funding by a Conservative Party government due to lobbying efforts by anti-abortion groups.

On 22 September 2011, the Canadian International Development Agency granted IPPF $6 million over three years. The money is for services yet to be rendered in Afghanistan, Bangladesh, Mali, Sudan, and Tanzania. Many anti-abortion activists have been critical of the spending including conservative MP Brad Trost who criticised his own party for supporting the "pro-choice" group.

=== Irish funding ===
Ireland, in June 2026, committed to doubling the amount of development aid funding that it gives to IPPF. On 14 June 2026, Neale Richmond T.D., Minister of State for International Development, addressed the IPPF annual meeting held in Dublin, calling that a “distinct honour”. In response, the Pro-Life Campaign said it was “shocking” that so much was spent on abortion while the Government “doesn’t donate a cent to funding positive alternatives”.

=== United States funding ===
IPPF advocates for access to comprehensive sexual and reproductive health services including contraception and safe abortion services. On his first day in office, U.S. President George W. Bush, reinstated the Mexico City Policy. This policy required non-governmental organisations in receipt of U.S. funds to refrain from providing or advocating for abortion services. IPPF opted not to sign the Global Gag Rule and lost 20% of its funding during the time the Mexico City Policy was in effect. The policy was rescinded by President Barack Obama in January 2009, but was reinstated by President Donald Trump in January 2017, but was once again rescinded by President Joe Biden in January 2021.

== Selected affiliates ==
- Category:International Planned Parenthood Federation affiliates
- IPPF Americas and the Caribbean Region
- Family Planning Queensland
- Pro Familia (Germany)
- IPPF European Network
- Mouvement français pour le planning familial (France)
- Sex og Politikk

== Conferences ==
The International Planned Parenthood Federation was established after earlier efforts to organise the post-World War II family planning and population control movements. The first conference was organised by the Swedish Association for Sexuality Education in Stockholm, in August 1946. Two years later another meeting was held, the International Congress on Population and World Resources in Relation to the Family, in Cheltenham, England in August 1948, predated the establishment of the IPPF.

- Third International Conference on Planned Parenthood, Bombay (present-day Mumbai), India (24–29 November 1952)
- Fourth International Conference on Planned Parenthood, Stockholm, Sweden (17–22 August 1953)
- Fifth International Conference on Planned Parenthood, Tokyo, Japan (24–29 October 1955)
- Sixth International Conference on Planned Parenthood, New Delhi, India (14–21 February 1959)
- Seventh International Conference on Planned Parenthood, Singapore (February 1963)
- Eighth International Conference on Planned Parenthood, Santiago, Chile (April 1967)
- Ninth International Conference on Planned Parenthood, Brighton, England (October 1973)

== Projects ==
The IPPF is connecting with the poor and vulnerable population to improve healthcare support. Throughout 2016, the IPPF provided services to over 45 million people, many of which are in a humanitarian crisis. These services include access to sexual and reproductive health services and training local people to educate others about healthcare. The IPPF help over 46,000 clinics and facilities by giving health products and services. One of their main focuses is on improving sexual health services, so they also give contraceptives to over 14,000 providers, many of which are in rural areas. The IPPF is working on helping countries, mostly in Sub-Saharan Africa, with HIV epidemics by providing HIV testing and counseling. In 2016, the IPPF supplied over 40 million HIV services, of which 59% was delivered to Africa. Africa has seen improvements among HIV and sexually transmitted infections testing and counseling. The IPPF is working alongside the Joint United Nations Programme on HIV and AIDS (UNAIDS) to promote preventions and treatments.

In Cairo in 1994, the International Conference on Population and Development (ICPD) stated that around 55% of couples were family planning in some way. Due to the family planning efforts, fertility rates were three to four children per woman in 1994, which is much lower than the average of six to seven children per woman in the 1960s.

== See also ==
- Avabai Bomanji Wadia
- Birth control movement in the United States
- Cecile Richards
