= Mumbai Mirror =

Indian English newspaper

- The frontpage of Mumbai Mirror on 2 August 2016
- Type: Daily newspaper (2005–2020)
- Format: Tabloid
- Owner: The Times Group
- Publisher: Metropolitan Media Company
- Editor: Ravi Joshi
- Launched: 25 May 2005; 21 years ago
- Language: English
- Headquarters: Bangalore, Karnataka
- City: Mumbai, Maharashtra
- Readership: 1,800,000+ (2017)
- Website: www.mumbaimirror.com

The Mumbai Mirror is an Indian English-language newspaper published in Mumbai, Maharashtra. Launched in 2005 as a compact daily newspaper, its coverage focused on city specific local news and civic issues concerning education, healthcare and municipal administration. The founding editor of the paper was Meenal Baghel who is credited for developing an aggressive public service oriented editorial outlook for the paper that it had till its downsizing in 2020. In 2017, it had a readership of over 1.8 million which made it the fifth most widely read English language newspaper in the country.

The newspaper is owned by The Times Group, the publisher of The Times of India. It was launched as part of a ringfencing tactic against competitors in the city of Mumbai. The paper's growth in circulation and positive editorial reception inspired the creation of other city specific newspapers such as the Bangalore Mirror, Pune Mirror and Ahmedabad Mirror.

In 2020, it was bundled with the other Mirror newspapers under a subsidiary called the Metropolitan Media Company, downsized and converted into a weekly newspaper. The head office of the newspaper was moved into the office of the Bangalore Mirror whose editor took over the paper. The paper had the largest readership among tabloid format newspapers in the city before its downsizing.

== History ==
=== Background ===
The Times of India had a market dominance in Mumbai for over a century, being known as the "Old Lady of Boribunder" in the city. In 2005, two rival newspapers were expected to be launched which threatened its market share. Dainik Bhaskar and the Zee Group had formed a joint venture to launch the Mumbai-based Daily News & Analysis, while the Hindustan Times which had primarily been a north Indian newspaper had announced the launch of its Mumbai edition. The Times Group was faced with large scale poaching including those of experienced journalists as well as sales and marketing executives. The economy was experiencing a boom and the two new entrants in the Mumbai market offered lucrative jobs to otherwise underpaid journalists.

The Times Group held routine consultations and deliberations over the threat posed to it. The board eventually approved the decision to launch a new newspaper, the Mumbai Mirror as a ringfencing tactic against the competition. The new newspaper would further reduce the advertisement revenue prospects for the new entrants. It was printed in the tabloid format and was launched quickly. The executives were aware of the potential of the paper cannibalising the market share of its parent but disregarded it. The company had adopted a similar tactic in 1989 when it launched The Independent to compete with the Indian Post, a newspaper founded by Vijaypat Singhania. Indian Post collapsed within a few years and The Independent was shut down with the company stating that it was unprofitable.

The Mumbai Mirror was launched on 25 May 2005 with a grand ceremony at the Gateway of India, which saw the attendance of the Bollywood star Abhishek Bachchan and the chief minister Vilasrao Deshmukh. The launch occurred before the other newspapers could be launched.

=== Daily newspaper ===
The Mumbai Mirror started as a free daily supplement alongside The Times of India. 200,000 copies were distributed on its inaugural print which gave it the second largest circulation in Mumbai after The Times of India itself. Marketed as a compact newspaper, the paper initially did not have catchy headlines but neither was it considered upmarket enough. It suffered as a result with the Mid-Day leading the tabloid circulation in the city. Meenal Baghel was the founding editor of the newspaper. The paper slowly developed a reputation for aggressive public service journalism under her. The circulation figures continued to grow in the following years, in spite of the competition. The success of the paper in terms of editorial and circulation inspired the launch of similar editions in other cities such as the Bangalore Mirror, Pune Mirror and Ahmedabad Mirror.

The newspaper suffered losses in its first three year. The competition was intense and all the leading newspapers were in losses but through it, The Times of India managed to retain its position as the paper with the highest circulation. Over the years the strategy employed by The Times Group was successful in outmaneuvering its competition, the joint venture for the Daily News & Analysis was abandoned and the Hindustan Times continued to remain in losses in the city as of 2020. The net valuation of the Mumbai Mirror in 2011 was at ₹200 crore (equivalent to ₹412 crore or US$43 million in 2023). It was circulated alongside The Times of India at a composite rate. The newspaper was sold at ₹3 as a standalone and at ₹7 alongside its parent broadsheet, The Times of India.

According to the Indian Readership Survey (2017), the newspaper had a readership of over 1.8 million placing it as the fifth most read English newspaper in India. The editorial product was considered to be a success and the newspaper became well regarded as a more critical, independent and city focused newspaper in contrast to the broadsheet. The media watchdog Newslaundry described it to have done "more than it was supposed to". Mumbai Mirror had gained the highest tabloid readership in the city, and it cannibalised the advertisement revenue of The Times Group. Throughout its existence, the rates in the newspaper was much lower than that of the parent broadsheet and there was down trading by advertisers as the high circulation rate made it a viable alternative at lower rates.

In 2019, the COVID-19 pandemic and its resultant lockdowns hit the profit margins of The Times Group. The net revenue from advertisements was decreasing in the last couple of years due to economic slowdown and with the pandemic, the circulation of both the newspapers in Mumbai took a hard drop. The government had also introduced import duties on newsprint which further increased expenses.

=== Downsizing ===
In 2020, the Mumbai Mirror was transferred to a subsidiary of The Times Group called the Metropolitan Media Company Ltd. (MMCL). The subsidiary bundled together all of the city specific newspapers of the group. The employees were made to sign new agreements with MMCL without any changes to their job profiles. The transfer became effective on 1 April and gave rise to speculations that The Times Group was either planning to sell off the city focused Mirror newspapers or shutting them down.

On 5 December 2020, The Times Group released a statement that the economic crisis induced by the pandemic had made the newspaper unviable. The group announced that it would be converted into a weekly newspaper and continue to publish online. Baghel broke the news in a virtual meeting with the employees of the paper. The management and the human resources department were both largely unaware and could not brief the employees on the development which caused confusion and uncertainty. The development also invoked negative reactions from readers and commentators, who perceived it to be a closure of the newspaper. The Times Group had remained profitable which raised questions on why the newspaper was being axed.

The Mumbai Mirror office was moved to the office of the Bangalore Mirror and placed under its editor, Ravi Joshi. In January, 40 journalists consisting 60% of the editorial team were laid off and the rest accommodated into either The Times of India or the digital media arm of the company, Times Internet. The retained employees included around 6 columnists who continued to publish their columns online on a vertical called TOI Plus. The laid off staff were not provided any severance packages and asked to serve their notice period with one month's basic pay. The company maintained that the Mumbai Mirror had not shut down but transformed into a weekly. According to a former employee, they had not resorted to legal recourse because it would close off any future prospects with the company and that the company could employ the defense that severance packages are not enforceable because the newspaper had not shut down.

=== Return ===
The Mumbai Mirror has restarted daily circulation from 15 June 2025.

== Content ==
The Mumbai Mirror focuses more on civic issues and in depth local news coverage concerning Mumbai over national news compared to other newspapers in the city. The coverage focuses on issues such as healthcare, crime, education and local administration concerning the city. It includes critical reportage accompanied with forceful unconventional headlines. The language of the paper is indigenised with greater use of informal terms, Hindi words and code-switching in quotes. The newspaper also utilises large spaces for images and provides greater coverage to celebrity and entertainment news.

The paper has a large range of columns on law, economy, culture, etc. It had a popular column called Ask the Sexpert which received readers questions related to sexual activity and gave humorous informative answers in return. The column was written by the retired obstretrician Mahinder Watsa until his death in 2020, it is credited for breaking taboos and being a space for imparting sex education including safe sex practices which are often neglected in education.

The photography editor of the Mumbai Mirror, Sebastian D'Souza captured a number of pictures of Ajmal Kasab during the 2008 Mumbai attacks including the most recognisable shot of the attacks; a closeup of Kasab with an assault rifle in a railway terminus. The photograph received a special mention in the spot news category of the World Press Photo of the Year. D'Souza later received the Red Ink Award for Lifetime Achievement for his photography in midst of attacks and for his earlier work with Agence France-Presse (AFP) during the 2002 Gujarat riots.

=== Editorial stance ===
The Mumbai Mirror has a hyperlocal focus, and an issue based campaign oriented journalism for initiating action towards solutions to civic issues including through collaboration with activists and college students. It is described to have reported news from a citizens point of view, questioning unresponsive civic authorities and featuring local heroes. One criticism of its editorial stand has been that it focuses on the interests of an English speaking middle class civil society in its advocacy for cleanliness in the city, disregarding compulsions of the working class population.

The newspaper has maintained an independent focus on national news compared to its broadsheet parent and reported critical stories on the central and the state governments throughout its history. It has also sustained pressures against being compromised into aligning in favor of the ruling dispensation in the post 2014 period of India.

== See also ==
- Mirror Buzz
