= Vimla Patil =

Indian journalist (died 2024)

- Born: Kolkata, West Bengal, India
- Died: September 29, 2024
- Occupations: Journalist, columnist, author, writer, activist, event designer
- Website: www.vimlapatil.com

Vimla Patil (died 29 September 2024) was an Indian journalist, author, activist, columnist, writer (books and features, speeches and research), event designer.

== Career ==
While studying journalism in London, Vimla Patil was a part-time trainee for The Telegraph and then worked for a business journal called The Office Magazine. Upon returning to India, she joined Femina, a Times of India publication, from its inaugural issue in 1959.

After a market research agency study in 1989 the management of Femina decided that the reader's interest had shifted from family and home to personal care. Femina also initiated the Miss India shows in India. It held the rights to choose Indian candidates for the Miss Universe, Miss World, Teen Princess, Miss Asia Pacific and other titles. Vimla Patil, the editor of Femina from 1959 to 1993, described the role that the pageant and the magazine had to play in creation of national identity: "When India became independent, there were, because of various states in India, different kinds of women. There was a Maharashtrian woman, there was a Punjabi woman, but nobody had identified what was an Indian woman. There was a question mark there. Who is the Indian woman? Nobody knew. Who was going to put all these threads together and make one fabric? That was the question. And the answer to that was Femina and Miss India."

In 2011, Vimla Patil edited "Fabulous Thali Meals By Chetana". She wrote a regular column "Evesdropping" for New Woman Magazine on social issues. She expresses her views on strong women-oriented issues, exchanges her ideas on controversial subjects, and debates on sensitive topics concerning women.

== Death ==
Patil died on 29 September 2024.

== Positions ==
- Board member, Tiger Watch NGO, Ranthambhore,
