= Dhanvanthi Rama Rau =

- Born: 1893; Hubli, India
- Died: 1987 (aged 93–94)
- Education: Presidency College, Chennai
- Occupations: Women's rights activist and social worker
- Known for: Women's rights and family planning advocacy
- Spouse: Sir Benegal Rama Rau
- Children: 2
- Awards: Padma Bhushan; Kaisir-i-Hind gold medal Griggs Gold Medal

Dhanvanthi, Lady Rama Rau (1893–1987) was founder and president of the Family Planning Association of India and the International Planned Parenthood Federation. Her husband was Sir Benegal Rama Rau, the noted civil servant; she was the mother of Santha Rama Rau, the writer.

== Early life ==
Dhanvanthi was born into a Kashmir Brahmin family as Dhanvanthi Handoo, born and brought up in Hubli (now in Karnataka) and was therefore conversant in Kannada. After schooling in Hubli, she moved to Madras to join the Presidency College, from where she graduated with a bachelor's degree in arts, and was awarded the Griggs Gold Medal in English.

In Madras, she met and married the distinguished economist and diplomat Sir Benegal Rama Rau, a Chitrapur Saraswat Brahmin and south Indian from a distinguished family.

== Career ==
She started her career as an assistant professor at Queen Mary's College, Madras.

In 1917, she co-founded the Women's Indian Association along with Annie Besant, Margaret Cousins, Jeena Raja Dasa, and others. This organization aimed to address and improve the difficult socio-economic and political conditions women faced during the 19th and early 20th centuries.

In 1932, she attended the International Alliance of Women for Suffrage and Equal Citizenship in Berlin, leading the Indian delegation at the behest of Sarojini Naidu.

In 1946, she was elected president of the All India Women's Conference.

In 1949, she started the Family Planning Association of India.

In 1952, Dhanvanthi co-founded and served as the joint president of the International Planned Parenthood Federation, along with Margaret Sanger.

== Awards ==
- Kaisir-i-Hind gold medal by the British Government for her work with women's associations.
- Padma Bhushan by the Indian Government in 1959.

== Bibliography ==
Her memoirs have been published under the title An Inheritance.
