= Mirror Buzz =

- Type: Supplement Magazine
- Owner: The Times Group
- Launched: August 2005
- Sister newspapers: Mumbai Mirror
- Website: Official Website
- Free online archives: Online Version Of Buzz

Mirror Buzz is a weekly supplement being distributed with the Mumbai tabloid Mumbai Mirror every Saturday. It has been in circulation since August 2005. It is owned by The Times Group and is published by Sam Dastoor.

== Components and format ==
Mirror Buzz comes in a magazine form and is 12" X 9" in dimensions. It "tries to capture the spirit of Mumbai". The supplement contains 30 to 32 pages and is fully coloured. The pages are glossy, though not of magazine quality. Regular features include "Numero-Logic", "Reviews", "Around Town", "Food", "Interiors", "Travel" and "Quick Take". Also included is a small "Letters to the Editor" section. Apart from the regular features, there are special articles on varied subjects and a cover story.

- The "Reviews" section contain a number of reviews of books, music and DVDs.
- The "Numero Logic" section in Mirror Buzz is a section on numerological predictions for the week by numerologists Sanjay Jumaani and Jhernna Jumaani. The predictions are provided for the nine planets indicating the nine numbers of the Birthdate of a person. The section also has a sub-section called "Reader Query" where queries by readers are answered in detail by the numerologist team.
- "Around Town" is a section where a common Mumbaikar is given the chance to review a restaurant in Mumbai. It is reviewed against such parameters as ambience, cost, food, service, etc. Generally, the amateur reviewer is accompanied by a professional food critic of the magazine.
- The section on "Food" is a two-page feature which contains a few recipes on a single theme. It also contains a small sub-section on food by restaurateur Móshe Shek and his own recipe.
- The "Travel" section covers tourism, especially those from outside India. Various regions like Cambodia, Sicily and Greece have been covered in this feature.
- In "Quick Take", which is at the last page of the issue, a celebrity is asked a few brief questions and is required to answer them briefly. There is also a small sub-section called "Freudian Snip", where a single word is given to the celebrity and they have to reply with another single word.
- The "Interiors" feature covers home décor, furnishings, interior designing, etc.

== Controversies ==
Mirror Buzz has courted some controversy since it was launched in 2005. The 12–18 November 2005 issue of Mirror Buzz contained a cover story called "Mercury Rising: How Hot Is Mumbai?", which explored the sexual trends of the city. However, this did not go down well with some culture protectors and activists and six NGOs subsequently filed a complaint against the publisher of the magazine. On 15 November 2005, the publisher of Mirror Buzz, Sam Dastoor was arrested on charges of "sale of obscene material" and "sale of obscene objects to young persons", before being released on bail. The publisher was also slapped with the Young Persons (Harmful Publications Act). The police alleged that the pictures of the two pairs of models published in the magazine were obscene and should not have been circulated in public. The police also added that the magazine featured nine pictures of nude and semi-nude couples in various stages of undress and making out. Surprisingly, The Times of India, the parent newspaper of Mirror Buzz did not give much space to the news, while rival newspapers such as Indian Express and Daily News and Analysis were quick to have a say against the activists and their ways to impose their value systems on the media.

In February 2006, the supplement was stuck in another controversy. This time, the Buzz drew the ire of Mumbai's Muslim community. Muslim protestors agitated against the supplement and the newspaper and staged a Rail-Roko at Mumbai Central railway station. They were protesting against a photograph in Mirror Buzz showing the back of a woman tattooed with Koranic verses.
