= Family Planning Association of India =

- Abbreviation: FPA India
- Formation: 1949
- Founder: Dhanvanthi Rama Rau
- Purpose: Sexual and Reproductive Health and Rights, Family Planning
- Headquarters: Mumbai
- Region served: India
- Affiliations: International Planned Parenthood Federation
- Website: fpaindia.org

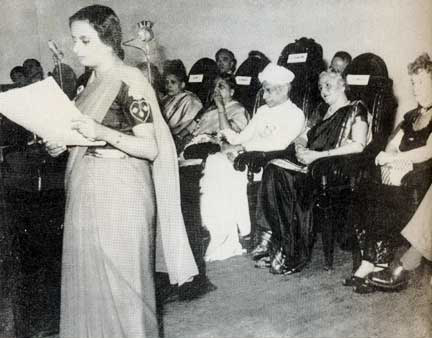
The Third International Conference, Bombay, 1952, Family Planning Association India Avabai Wadia (reading message), Sarvepalli Radhakrishnan, Dhanvanthi Rama Rau, Margaret Sanger

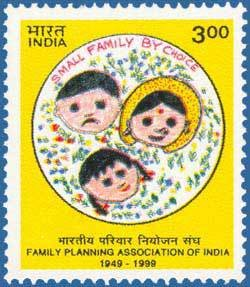
Family Planning Association of India stamp on its 50th anniversary, 1999

The Family Planning Association of India (FPA India) is a registered charity in India. Established in 1949 by Dhanvanthi Rama Rau and Avabai Bomanji Wadia, the organisation has 40 local branches across the country that promote sexual health and family planning. It is the national affiliate of the International Planned Parenthood Federation. Among other issues, the organisation promotes reproductive choices, legal and safe abortion, education about sexually transmitted diseases and sexual and reproductive health. FPA India has 39 permanent clinics under them. The current national president is Dr. Rathnamala M. Desai. FPA India is a social impact organisation delivering essential health services focusing on sexual and reproductive health in 18 states of India.

== Local branches ==
It has local branches in Agra, Ahmedabad, Bangalore, Belgaum, Bellary, Bhopal, Bhubaneswar, Bidar, Bijapur, Chennai, Dharwad, Dindigul, Gomia, Gwalior, Hyderabad, Indore, Jabalpur, Jaipur, Kalchini, Kolkata, Lucknow, Madurai, Mohali, Mumbai, Mysore, Nagaland, New Delhi, Nilgiris, North Kanara, Panchkula, Patna, Pune, Raichur, Rajkot, Shimoga, Singhbhum, Solapur, South Kanara, Srinagar, Trivandrum, Thane and Yamunanagar .

== Collaborating partners ==
- National Integrated Medical Association (NIMA)
- Federation of Indian Chambers of Commerce and Industry (FICCI)
- Packard Foundation
- Planned Parenthood Federation of America, University of Rochester, United States
- Japan Trust Fund
- UNFPA
- West Wind Foundation
- Ford Foundation
- Government of India
- State AIDS Cell
- Family Health International (FHI)
- Centre for Operations Research and Training (CORT)
- Humanas
- Avert Society
