= Femina (India) =

Indian magazine (1959- present)

- January 2021 issue of Femina featuring Deepika Padukone
- Editor-in-Chief: Ambika Muttoo
- Categories: Women's magazine
- Frequency: Biweekly (1959-2020); Monthly (2020-present)
- Publisher: The Times Group
- First issue: July 1959
- Company: Worldwide Media
- Country: India
- Based in: Mumbai
- Language: English, Hindi, Bengali and Tamil
- Website: www.femina.in
- OCLC: 1327320

Femina (stylized in all caps) is an Indian magazine owned by Worldwide Media, a wholly owned subsidiary of The Times Group. Femina, the oldest women's English magazine in the country, has been published for almost six decades. It has evolved to cover a broad spectrum of topics, including relationships, career, fashion, beauty, and women achievers who have left a mark in their chosen field.

The bimonthly magazine branched out into regionals with Femina Hindi, Femina Bangla and Femina Tamil. Apart from this, it publishes Femina Salon & Spa, which is distributed directly to Indian beauty businesses monthly, and verticals such as Femina Brides, Femina Parenting, and Femina Cookbook at varying periodicity.

Some of its Marque properties are Femina Beauty Awards, Femina Women Awards, Femina Stylista, Femina Showcase.

== History and profile ==
Femina was founded in 1959. The magazine was first published in July 1959. It has organized and sponsored the Femina Miss India beauty pageant since 1964. From 1994 to 1999, it also sponsored the Femina Look of the Year contest to send an Indian contestant to the Elite Model Look competition.

=== Editor 1959–present ===
Frene Talyakhan, after working as an editor with magazines like Trend and Flair, became the editor of Femina in 1959, when Flair was bought over by the Times of India group. The staff under her editorship were Ina Sen, Vimala Patil, Anita Sarkar and Nina Merchant. Patil became the editor of Femina in 1973, and remained so for the next 20 years. Patil was succeeded by Sathya Saran, who served as the editor from 1993 till 2005. Amy Fernandes then held the post for a brief period of two years, from 2005 to 2007, and was followed by Tanya Chaitanya, who served as the editor till 2020. Ruchika Mehta briefly held the title before Ambika Muttoo, who is currently in the post, became the editor in April 2021.

=== Tagline 1976–present ===
Femina's efforts to keep in sync with the changing times, becomes evident through its choice of tagline that accompanied the issues over the years. It exemplifies what kind of women it was trying to target at a particular time, as well as, what image of itself it wanted to be associated with. The tagline played a crucial role in the magazine's market strategy. The March 1976 issue has the tagline "Something exciting to look forward to every fortnight." By February 1978, the tagline is reduced to three precise words, "Thoughtful, Contemporary, Aware." From January to July 1981, the tagline, "The Exciting World of Women", aligns Femina's identity more as a women-centric magazine. By August 1981, it changes to "A woman's window to the world." In September 1982 issue, the tagline accompanying the Femina logo is "Woman at her best."

In the 1990s, the magazine carried the tagline "For the woman of substance." By 2000, the tagline shifts to "Generation W", replacing the earlier label, and so addressing all the woman of a generation, and not just a select few women who are considered to be of substance, becoming more inclusive and broad. It shifts to "Believe" till 2009 and then by 2010 changes to "For all the women you are." According to Tarun Rai, the CEO of Worldwide Media the reason behind the new tagline was to "celebrate how far the contemporary Indian woman has come" and that Femina "continues to be a beacon of change for her." For Prachi Tiwari, Femina's brand publisher, this tagline is to pay a tribute to the "multifaceted woman of today, who is more than one person, playing more than one role."

In 2014, Femina relaunched with the tagline "Be Unstoppable", which is its running tagline as of 2019. For Tarun Rai, "Be Unstoppable" seeks to capture what the Femina brand believes in, which is that the modern women of India today have the confidence "to live their lives on their terms and achieve more."

== "Prescription" column ==
A new column was introduced in the late 1980s, specifically dedicated to answer any form of sexual dilemmas faced by women. Queries were answered by gynaecologists like Dr. Prakash Kothari and Dr. Mahinder Watsa.
