= Family Planning Queensland =

True Relationships & Reproductive Health
- Abbreviation: True
- Formation: 1972; 54 years ago
- Type: Non-profit
- Headquarters: Brisbane, Queensland
- Region served: Queensland
- Services: Sexual and reproductive health
- Chairperson: Annabel Hickey
- Affiliations: Family Planning Alliance Australia
- Staff: 130
- Website: www.true.org.au
- Formerly called: Family Planning Queensland (FPQ)

True Relationships & Reproductive Health, or more commonly known as True, (previously Family Planning Queensland or FPQ) is a non-profit organisation that promotes sexual and reproductive health to Queensland, a state in Australia. It was established in 1972, and runs nine regional centres across Queensland.

True is a secondary health care provider, which plays a role in the referral pathways between general practices and hospitals.

In addition to clinical services, True provides education and training for clinicians. It is a member of Family Planning Alliance Australia (FPAA) and conducts the FPAA National Certificate in Sexual & Reproductive Health for Doctors and other courses.

== History ==
The oral contraceptive pill became available in Australia in 1961, during a period of social and political change. Until 1969, however, New South Wales was the only state to offer family planning services through the Family Planning Association of Australia. In the subsequent years, independent family planning associations were formed in all the other states.

Queensland remained relatively conservative, especially about sexuality. Sexuality education in schools was minimal, teenage pregnancy in Queensland was the highest compared to other states in Australia, abortion was illegal, and access to contraception was restricted. Marriage was typically a pre-requisite for contraceptive counselling. In 1970, the Queensland branch of the Abortion Law Reform Association (later Children by Choice) was formed, and along with the Queensland branch of the Women's Electoral Lobby, started campaigning for family planning facilities, sex education in schools, and legal and safe abortion.

FPQ was formed with the joint agreement of the Australian Medical Association and the Royal Australian College of General Practitioners. Its aims were to provide clinic and training facilities and make information freely available.

The first FPQ clinic opened in Fortitude Valley in March 1972 with the aid of volunteer members. Voluntary committees established services in Cairns, Townsville, and Rockhampton later in 1972, and at the Gold Coast the following year. In 1974, with funding provided by the Commonwealth government, clinics opened in Ipswich and Mount Gravatt. The Toowoomba and Sunshine Coast centres were established in 1986 and 1989, respectively.

Today, FPQ works in nine regional centres located in Cairns, Townsville, Rockhampton, Bundaberg, Sunshine Coast, Brisbane, Ipswich, Toowoomba, and the Gold Coast. From these sites, FPQ provides a range of clinical, education, training, and information services in the area of sexual and reproductive health.

== Funding ==
True receives income from a wide variety of sources. Queensland Health provides funding mainly to support the delivery of clinic services for women, especially services that require a greater deal of expertise or specialised equipment. True is also funded by other departments of the Queensland Government to coordinate specific projects and services. These include counselling services provided to children and families by the Cairns Sexual Assault Service and a multicultural health program that aims to stop female genital mutilation. True has also been successful in obtaining grant income to carry out projects and create resources, some of which have gone on to contribute income to the organisation over the years. The organisation rents out its meeting rooms to supplement income and licenses intellectual property, such as its well-known Traffic Lights suite of products. Additionally, True receives income each year from donors and members.

== Services ==
True has four service lines:

- Clinic services, which provides expert reproductive and sexual health services to women across the lifespan
- Clinical education and training, which trains doctors and nurses
- Community education, which provides education to schools, families and community groups
- Cairns Sexual Assault Service

=== Clinic ===
True serves women and men of all ages, although 97% of its clinic clients are female. The clinic is positioned as a second-tier service, where general practice is primary health and hospitals are tertiary levels. In practice, that means the clinic helps to reduce hospital waiting lists by providing services in a community setting that would otherwise be referred to hospitals. The services provided cover the full breadth of reproductive and sexual health, and clients can make appointments independently or on referral from GPs or a hospital. Each year, True provides services to approximately 20,000 clients in its clinics.

=== Clinician education ===
The training of doctors and nurses is an important part of True's social mission. When FPQ was first formed, it was because of the dearth of trained clinicians with an interest in women's health. Today, having trained thousands of clinicians, True has facilitated a much larger number of trained clinicians to serve the population. As a result, True now offers more complex services, focusing less on services that GPs can provide.

=== Community education ===
True offers comprehensive education to schools, families and community groups. Educators provide sexual information for primary and high school students, tertiary students, parents and families, youth groups, people with disabilities and their carers, older people, people from non-English speaking backgrounds, Aboriginal and Torres Strait Islanders and other community groups. Each year, True provides services to approximately 30,000 people through its education programs.

True has historically acted as a publisher of trusted resources for schools and other groups. True's work in the area of child safety has yielded one of the best-selling books in Australia, Everyone's Got a Bottom. It also led to the publication of the Traffic Lights framework, which is widely used in Australia and internationally as a way to quickly identify, understand and respond to child sexual behaviours. The Traffic Lights framework has since been incorporated into a book called Is This Normal? and a Traffic Lights app

== Social change ==
In the 1970s, Queensland lagged other Australian states in the adoption of in-school education. In March 1981, the Queensland Premier, Sir Joh Bjelke-Petersen, stated that:

NSW has become an object lesson in so many ways for other States on what you must not do if you wish to maintain decent standards. Morally, the subject [of sexual education] is fraught with danger for any government.

This argument boils down to the idea that ignorance is the same thing as innocence. However, experience and research from other jurisdictions have shown that education delays the onset of sexual activity, reduce the incidence of risky sexual behaviour that leads to unintended pregnancy and sexually transmitted infections. The inclusion of relationships and sexuality education in Australia's national curriculum reflects mainstream recognition of the importance of this information, although the exact nature of content and delivery are occasionally contested.
