= National Integrated Medical Association =

Indian medical association

- Abbreviation: NIMA
- Formation: 1971; 55 years ago
- Headquarters: New Delhi

The National Integrated Medical Association (NIMA) is an Indian non-governmental organisation of general practitioners educated in integrated system of medicine which includes study of Modern Medicine and knowledge of ayurveda/unani/siddha with scientific approach.

NIMA is officially established in 1971 with the motive to promote scientific integration of Modern Medicine & Ancient Indian Medicine i.e. ayurveda/unani/siddha.

NIMA is registered in The Office of Charity Commissioner, Brihan Mumbai Region, with registration no. F 2469

== First meeting ==
The first meeting of the NIMA Central Council was held at Delhi on 6-4-1969 which elected P N Awasthi (Bombay) as the president and K S Potdar (Delhi) as the General Secretary of NIMA. There is one more information about the first meeting of NIMA which happened in Gwalior in 1964.

== Activities and achievements ==
National Integrated Medical Association has strongly protested against Union Health Ministry & MCI's proposal to start new three & half years course (BRMS) for rural health.
