= Childbirth in Benin =

Childbirth practices in Benin are strongly influenced by the sociopolitical structure of the West African country.

== Background ==
=== Social structure and organization ===
About 50 cultural groups are represented in Benin, with the most numerous being the Fon (39.2%), Adja (15.2%), Yoruba (12.3%), and Batombu/Bariba (9.2%). The population of Benin was estimated in 2022 to be around 13,750,000, with 50% of the population living in urban environments and a 4% rate of urbanization. Benin ranks 163rd out of 177 in the United Nations Human Development Index. Forty-four percent of the population is under age 15, and 42% are literate.

The practice of polygamy persists, though it has seen a significant decrease in recent time. Between 1996 and 2006, the percentage of men in polygamous marriages went from 33% to 26%, and in women it went from 50% to 42%. On average, women marry by ages 18–19, and men typically marry by age 25.

Many languages are spoken in Benin though the official language of the country is French. Fon and Yoruba are most prevalent in the south, while the north has about 6 main indigenous languages.

=== Political and economic system ===
Since independence on August 1, 1960, Benin has provided a model of democracy in West Africa. In December 1990, the constitution that determines the current electoral regime was established. The constitution ensures the human rights of the population of Benin and ensures universal suffrage. Fifteen departments were recognized in 1999 in an effort to decentralize governing bodies.

Agriculture continues to be the primary economic activity in Benin. The country exports cotton, peanuts, and palm products and focuses domestically on corn, yam, manioc, beans, millet, and sorghum. Industries such as textiles, food processing, construction materials, and cement constitute the greatest portion of the industrial sector.

=== Religion ===
Religions practiced in Benin include the following: Christian (42.8%), Muslim (24.4%), Vodoun (17.3%), and "other" (15.5%). Of the percentage that identify as Christian, 27.1% are Catholic, 5% are Celestial, 3.2% are Methodist, and 2.2% are other Protestant. In Benin, people who practice on religion such as Christianity or Islam may also have had significant influence from traditional religious beliefs, such as vodoun, and practice aspects of vodoun along with Christianity or Islam.

=== Physical environment ===
Benin is bound by the Atlantic Ocean to the south, Togo to the west, Burkina Faso and Niger to the north, and Nigeria to the east. The climate is tropical: heat and humidity persist for most of the year. The average temperature is 25 °C (77 °F), with temperatures peaking in March and dipping in August. July to October marks the rainy season.

=== Health and illness theories ===
Health and illness are often closely related to spiritual beliefs and practices in Benin. The practices of vodoun and traditional medicine reflect spirituality in illnesses as well as in cures. Among the Bariba in the north of Benin, folk illnesses are identified as those groups of symptoms for which science-based medicine provides neither an etiology nor a cure. Explanations of such illnesses are often spiritual in nature, deriving from the ill will of another person or an interaction with certain elements of nature. With colonialism came the advent of hospitals to treat illnesses and in which women would even give birth. Consumers of traditional medicine have expressed skepticism of hospitals because local healers are known to keep secrets well, while providers in hospital settings developed a reputation of non-adherence to patient confidentiality.

Traditionally, healers in northern Benin would not ask for money for services, but rather patrons would offer them gifts when treatments were administered. The advent of hospitals and their associated fees presented a model of health care that was previously counter-intuitive to the Bariba people.

=== Women's Health Statistics ===
The maternal mortality ratio in Benin has been estimated between 473 and 990 deaths per 100,000 live births. The most recent Demographic and Health Surveys maternal mortality estimate for Benin is 498 deaths per 100,000 live births. Infant mortality is estimated at 61.56 deaths per 1,000 live births. Life expectancy at birth is 59.84 years; for women it is estimated at 61.14 years. The fertility rate in Benin is 5.31 children per woman. HIV/AIDS incidence is 1.2%, which means about 60,000 people Benin are living with HIV/AIDS. The under-5 mortality rate decreased from 160 deaths per 1,000 in 2001 to 125 deaths per 1,000 in 2006.<USAID2008/>

Between 1982 and 1996, fertility declined only modestly and concentrated in younger women, from 6.4 to 5.2 children per woman in cities and from 7.4 to 7 children per woman in rural areas. The mean ideal family size in 1982 was 7.4 children and in 1996 dropped to 5.8 children. Overall contraceptive use in Benin is estimated at 16%, and most of this percentage is due to periodic abstinence (7%) and withdrawal (5%). In 2006 it was estimated that 6% of married women use a modern method of contraception, and 30% of married women desire to limit and/or space their pregnancies but do not use a modern contraceptive.

Since 2003, female genital mutilation in any form was deemed illegal in Benin. Some forms of female genital mutilation continue to be practiced in the north of the country, and 13% of women reported in 2006 that they had undergone some form of genital mutilation. Bariba women have the highest percentage of female circumcision, 74%. Other groups in the north still practice forms of genital mutilation, including the Fulas (72%) and Yoa/Lokpa (53%). Female circumcision was not reported among the Fon or Adja. Of the women who reported having undergone a form of female circumcision, 49% had the procedure done before age 5.

Though 76% of people in Benin live within 5 km of the nearest health facility, only 44% of this population use their services. Among the top reasons for visits to the health center are malaria, acute respiratory infections, and diarrhea. These three illnesses are responsible for 70% of visits to health centers and 65% of deaths under age 5.

== Pregnancy behaviors and beliefs ==
=== Prenatal care and pregnancy attitudes ===
A strong percentage of women in Benin receive prenatal care at some time during their pregnancy. Estimates have indicated that 97% of women received prenatal care in 1996 and 88% in 2006. In 2006, it is estimated that 93% of women in urban areas and approximately 85% of women in rural areas receive prenatal care, though rural estimates vary by department. About 61% receive the four prenatal visits recommended by the World Health Organization. Of those women who have prenatal consultations, 86% took iron supplements, and about 45% had any kind of nutritional counseling. The use of technology in prenatal consultations has increased; in 2001, about 8% of women had an ultrasound, while in 2006, 21% had an ultrasound. The recommended two doses of tetanus toxoid vaccine were received by 56% of women in 2006. It is most likely that a woman seeking prenatal care will use the services of a midwife for consultations; about 80% of women see a midwife or nurse prenatally.

Motivations to seek out prenatal care include symptoms that prevent the completion of daily tasks, indications of abnormality such as bleeding, pain, or fever, fears of miscarriage, and fears of repeated complications seen in prior pregnancies. If a woman does not notice any indications of complications during early pregnancy, she may opt to wait until late into the second trimester or third trimester to seek out prenatal care. Barriers to accessing prenatal care include cost and transportation. Women in Benin report that negotiating funds from husbands for prenatal care or associated prescriptions can lead to arguments between spouses as well as frustrations between patient and provider.

In Benin, pregnancy is often a way to gain status and respect in one's community. Getting pregnant can therefore become more a pressure from society than an individual's choice in many cases. Some women in Benin report that pregnancy indicates good fortune, but others cannot help but express concern about the extra costs another child will bring. Beninese women also describe pregnancy and birth as a time of great vulnerability, and more specifically, as a time 'where life and death converge'.

=== Contraception ===
Family planning has changed drastically in Benin since a 1920 law that forbade any contraception propaganda. Since 1971, the Benin Family Promotion Association, a nongovernmental organization, has supported contraceptive use in select cities and constitutes the first formal family planning initiative in Benin. In 1982, the government began a family welfare project with the aim to include family planning in maternal and child health initiatives. In 1996, about 80% of women knew of modern contraception, but many say that unless they had already reached their desired number of children, they would not use it due to rumors about the dangers of potential result in sterilization. In 2003, a law was established that states that everyone has a right to be informed and use the legal family planning method of their choice.

Contraceptive use in Benin may include traditional and modern methods, and many cultures in Benin value natural child spacing. Primary methods of birth control are abstinence from sex and lactation after the birth of a child. In the region of West Africa, use of modern contraceptives among married women is about 10%, and the desired number of children continues to be high. Modern contraceptive use in Benin is estimated at 3.5%. Younger women tend to use contraceptives more than older cohorts (18% use for ages 20–24). About 11% of women under age 20 in Benin use some type of family planning, whether traditional or modern methods. Sexually active unmarried women have a higher contraceptive use around 50%, 14% of which is modern contraception.

The average interval between births is 34 months. A woman who gives birth too soon after the previous child may lose the respect of her community. The Fon word kpedovi refers to the older of a pair of children born too close together. Kpedovi gained the reputation of being under-nurtured because their mothers weaned them earlier and focused more attention on the younger child. Women in Benin state reasons for adequate child spacing as concern for the health and well-being of both children nutritionally and psychologically. They state that having children too soon after each other is also potentially detrimental to the mother's health.

Therapeutic abortion is illegal in Benin, so incidence is difficult to measure. It is used for the purpose of child spacing and limiting number of births across all ages and social classes.

== Labor ==
=== Place ===
The place of labor and birth differs from north to south. In the north, Bariba women have traditionally idealized labor and birth to occur alone and in the home with no attendants. Bariba women will labor with the intention of letting no one know that labor has begun; they will go about their daily tasks as normal. In the south, where it is more common to deliver in a health facility, labor may occur at home for a portion of the time then continue at the facility.

=== Pain ===
The perception of and reaction to pain also differ greatly from north to south. Among the Bariba in the north, it is socially expected that one respond to pain with stoicism, indicating the level of courage that is inextricably associated with the Bariba people. For women, labor and childbirth is the time at which one can show her greatest virtue; to respond verbally or physically to pain would be to shame oneself and her family. As a Bariba proverb states, 'Between death and shame, death has the greater beauty'.

The lack of response to pain among the Bariba is traditionally a means of maintaining superiority over neighboring peoples. Reflecting this relationship to pain is the lack of vocabulary to describe pain. Expressions may manifest in a "wee," a clicking of the teeth, or shaking one hand in the air, but these reactions are not looked upon favorably in the community. One midwife would describe a woman who reacted with these manifestations of pain during labor as "wild and uncontrolled".

The Fon of the south will embody the pain by crying out and moving in response to it; they believe that the cries will speed delivery and show the father of the child the extent to which the woman is suffering for the birth of their child. The Bariba would criticize such displays of physical pain. Southern women who migrate to the north may try to emulate the Bariba response to pain because though that is not the cultural norm in their community, they respect the person who can remain stoic in the face of pain.

Though Bariba women who deliver in health facilities may not indicate that the birthing is more painful than at home, they give some indications that it is more uncomfortable due to a lack of privacy, the possibility of being attended by male staff, restrictions on who can accompany a woman in a delivery setting, and the authority of the hospital staff. There is also little distraction and the element of staying in bed that changes the dynamic of labor and the associated discomfort.

Pain management with analgesics varies across the country. Because temporary or chronic lack of resources may inhibit a reliable supply of pain medications in a health facility setting, analgesics are not routinely used during labor.

=== Attendants and Support ===
The Bariba of the north labor alone and attempt to conceal the commencement and duration of their labor. They will request assistance only when it is time to cut the umbilical cord. If they are in the hospital, they may labor alone without the ability to perform daily tasks and distract themselves. Depending on the midwife attending the birth, a woman will either be left to labor alone, or in some cases be attended with more care and compassion.

Some supportive behavior for labor might include measures that accelerate contractions and therefore speed delivery. The midwives among the Bariba people may use onion leaves or a kitchen utensil to induce a gag, thereby accelerating contractions. A scarf held taut against the belly was also used therapeutically to massage a woman.

== Birth ==
=== Attendants and assistants ===
The birth attendant that a woman in Benin is most likely to encounter is a midwife. Nurse-midwives will have completed a three-year education in the main city, Cotonou, and all are female. In hospitals, staff physicians supervise midwives and provide specialized care in cases with complications. In the north among the Bariba people, who traditionally aim to deliver at home without assistance, an older woman may be consulted for possible interventions. The only assistance a Bariba woman may have if she delivers alone at home is a woman to come help her cut the umbilical cord.

=== Decision-Making Power ===
The locus of decision-making power is within the woman in Bariba culture. Their ideal birth environment and methods are aimed to demonstrate courage and bring honor to a family, but birthing alone has also been motivated by the ability to detect a witch child and determine its fate (see Infanticide). In healthcare facilities, power shifts to the health personnel in both the north and the south, and the woman is obligated to stay within the facility and perhaps sacrifice dignity and privacy in the presence of the staff. Bariba women believe that birth is natural and not pathological; a specialist is therefore not required.

=== Place of Birth ===
In the southern areas of Cotonou, Porto Novo, and their environs, about 97% of women deliver in health facilities. In the country as a whole, it is estimated that 78% of women deliver in a health facility, 65% of which deliver in the public sector. Twenty-two percent deliver at home. Most women (69%) deliver with the assistance of a nurse or midwife, while 78% of women are delivering with a health worker. Four percent deliver with a nurse's aide, 12% with family members, 5% with a traditional birth attendant, and 4% with no assistance. Approximately 4% deliver by cesarean section.

=== Birth Position ===
Birth position is greatly influenced by place of birth in Benin. A Bariba woman is expected to labor and birth alone at home, and when it comes time to deliver, she does so on her knees. Women delivering in maternity clinics or hospitals will most likely encounter a delivery table and deliver sitting or lying down.

=== Behavior for Complications or Abnormalities ===
Obstetrical complications that would result in severe morbidity or mortality if health care resources were not available are considered 'near-miss' events. The most common causes of near-miss events in Benin are hypertension (42%), dystocia (27%), hemorrhage (26%), anemia (14%), and infection (2%). The majority of women in the south with these complications deliver by cesarean section (58%). The incidence of these near-miss events was found to be dependent on age, education level, and socioeconomic background.

Spirituality and traditional beliefs play a role in the birth scene. The use of traditional medicine typically complements modern prescriptions in much of Benin. Many women see it unnecessary to pay for medications bought from the pharmacy when medicinal plants are ubiquitous. The threat of witchcraft at the time of delivery is also a concern that some women in Benin will address with traditional remedies such as the use of spiritual practitioners.

=== Cesarean Section ===
The movement of birth from traditional means of consultations and delivery to the medical environment of clinics and hospitals has had a significant social impact in Benin. The medicalization of birth was found to suppress social norms and fall short of meeting the needs and expectations of women in Benin. Cesarean section has been described in Benin as an act against nature, and women cite that their mothers and grandmothers were fortunate to have avoided it. A fear of cesarean section in Benin may be the cause of rumor, but it may also be justified based on the outcomes. One in 20 women who delivered by cesarean section in Cotonou died of post-surgical complications.

As of April 2009, the government of Benin made cesarean sections free to those needing emergent operative delivery in 43 nonprofit public hospitals. Hospitals receive reimbursement of 100,000 CFA per woman undergoing cesarean section for delivery, medications, kits, blood, and a seven-day hospital stay.

== Postpartum ==
=== After the birth ===
The postpartum period is typically defined as the time after birth to 42 days. Only 3% of women attend postnatal visits within the first two days after birth, and 31.6% have no postnatal checkups at all. Women typically return home shortly after the birth unless they give birth in a hospital and are unable to pay. A common practice in Benin is the holding of women and their newborns at the clinic until debts for services rendered are paid. Another reason why women may not return to a clinic is because of the quality of treatment they encounter in the facility.

=== Breastfeeding ===
In 1982, the mean duration of breastfeeding was 17.8 months, and this decreased slightly to 16.9 months in 1996. The rate of breastfeeding versus bottle-feeding varies greatly between rural and urban areas, and women in rural areas may have too many barriers to the use of bottles (lack of clean water for formula or means of cleaning bottles). In the Bariba language, bottle-feeding is known as 'white woman's breast' (baturen bwaaro), and many people in the rural north have never heard of it.

=== Postpartum depression ===
Near-miss perinatal death was found to put women in Benin at greater risk for postpartum depression. When a woman loses a baby, she is more likely to become pregnant again soon afterward. Reactions to near-miss events include feeling blamed by community members and family for the adverse outcome. Complications experienced during pregnancy and birth can also bring great financial stress and will greatly affect the postpartum period.

== The Newborn ==
=== Newborn Health ===
Thirteen percent of children born in Benin were found to be of low birth weight (< 2.5 kilograms (5.5 lb)), and only 59% of children's weights were recorded. Acute respiratory infections, malaria, and diarrheal diseases cause the majority of hospitalizations for children ages 0–5 in 2005. Less than half of all children (47%) age 12–23 months have received basic vaccinations, and in 2001 it was 59%, indicating a significant decrease in immunization coverage. Many children in Benin start immunization courses but do not complete them.

=== Rites of Passage ===
In the north, the Bariba consider children to be humans without reason until age two, when they are weaned from breastfeeding and reach a milestone in development. Bariba children are baptized or undergo clitoridectomy as rites of passage. An infant is named initially according to birth order and sex then later may be given a Muslim name at baptism 8 days after birth. Bariba children of high status might be named at age four or five. Children go through stages of acceptance into Bariba society, so naming ceremonies may be delayed into childhood.

Bariba parents may also wait to initiate their children into society because of the possibility of the child being a witch. The appearance of teeth, particularly whether they appear first in the upper or lower gums, may determine the fate of the child. Initiation for boys into Bariba culture is circumcision, and for girls it is traditionally clitoridectomy, though this is now illegal in Benin. The Bariba ideal response to pain is first taught during these processes of initiation, and it is thought to prepare the child for the great challenges of adulthood. The expression of pain during these times of initiation can bring shame to a Bariba family.

=== Infanticide ===
Infanticide is a traditional practice of several cultures of the north of Benin, but due to greater numbers of births occurring in health facilities under the supervision of members of a community who would report suspected intentions of infanticide, its occurrence is decreasing. Infanticide is practiced in Bariba culture if it is determined that the child born is a witch and will in fact do great harm to the family and community if alive and/or kept by the family. Criteria for determining if a child is a witch include abnormal presentation at delivery (breech birth), extreme birth defects, early delivery (at 8 months), having teeth at birth, appearance of teeth in upper gums before lower gums, and sliding on stomach at birth. Traditionally, a child determined to be a witch would be detected by the mother, who would have delivered alone, and the mother would decide the child's fate. Witch children would be poisoned by specialists or left to die by starvation.

Neutralization is more frequently used as an alternative to infanticide and involves the use of traditional medicine to 'neutralize' the witch nature of the child. Bariba parents may also send the child to foreign missions or pastors in other villages. Detection of a witch child in a clinic will most likely result in neutralization because of the impact of authorities forbidding infanticide and the threat of reporting the mother.
