= Bart C. J. M. Fauser =

Dutch reproductive endocrinologist (born 1954)

- Born: July 25, 1954 (age 72); Netherlands
- Citizenship: Dutch
- Education: Radboud University Nijmegen
- Known for: Rotterdam diagnostic criteria for polyendocrine metabolic ovarian syndrome (PMOS); AMH as ovarian reserve marker; Mild ovarian stimulation for IVF
- Awards: Knight in the Order of the Netherlands Lion (2017); International Member, National Academy of Medicine (2019); Member, Academia Europaea (2023)
- Scientific career
- Fields: Reproductive endocrinology; Obstetrics and gynaecology
- Workplaces: University Medical Center Utrecht; Erasmus University Medical Center

Bart C. J. M. Fauser (born 25 July 1954) is a Dutch reproductive endocrinologist and gynaecologist, and Professor Emeritus of Reproductive Medicine at Utrecht University and the University Medical Center Utrecht.

His research career has centred on polyendocrine metabolic ovarian syndrome (PMOS), ovarian reserve, and stimulation protocols for in vitro fertilisation (IVF). A 2015 bibliometric study in Fertility and Sterility ranked him the most cited author in clinical reproductive medicine worldwide for the decade 2003–2012.

== Education ==
Fauser studied medicine at the Catholic University of Nijmegen (now Radboud University Nijmegen) from 1971 to 1979, then completed his residency in obstetrics and gynaecology at Groot Ziekengasthuis and St. Radboud University Hospital between 1981 and 1986. His PhD, awarded in 1985, examined LH-RH and reproductive function in men.

Between 1987 and 1988, he worked as a Fulbright scholar at the University of California, San Diego.

== Academic career ==
After joining Erasmus University Medical Center in 1986 as assistant professor, Fauser rose to Professor of Reproductive Endocrinology by 1997, a post he held until 2003. In 2004 he moved to the University Medical Center Utrecht as Professor of Reproductive Medicine, where he chaired the Department of Obstetrics and Gynaecology and led the Division of Woman & Baby until his appointment as Professor Emeritus in 2018.

He held visiting professorships at Stanford University School of Medicine (1993–1995), the Free University of Brussels (1995–2008), the University of Southampton (2010–2017), the University of Siena (2011–2017), and the University of Adelaide (2013–2019). From 2012 to 2018 he chaired the World Health Organization steering committee on infertility guidelines. He also served on the board of ZonMw, the Dutch national medical research council, from 2012 to 2020.

== Research ==
=== Polyendocrine metabolic ovarian syndrome (PMOS) diagnostic criteria ===
In 2003, Fauser participated in a consensus workshop in Rotterdam, jointly convened by the European Society of Human Reproduction and Embryology (ESHRE) and the American Society for Reproductive Medicine (ASRM). The workshop produced what became known as the Rotterdam criteria: a diagnostic framework for polyendocrine metabolic ovarian syndrome (PMOS) requiring two of three findings — oligo-anovulation, hyperandrogenism, or polycystic ovaries on ultrasound. The corresponding paper, co-published simultaneously in Human Reproduction and Fertility and Sterility, had accumulated approximately 5,400 citations in each journal as of the mid-2020s.

=== Ovarian reserve and stimulation ===
Work from Fauser's group established that serum anti-Müllerian hormone (AMH) levels fall with age in normo-ovulatory women and track antral follicle count, pointing to a possible role as a clinical marker of ovarian reserve. A 2026 review in Molecular Human Reproduction traced the line of work from that early paper to the clinical adoption of AMH testing.

On IVF stimulation, a 2007 randomised trial in The Lancet — with Fauser as senior author — tested whether a mild stimulation protocol combined with single embryo transfer could match standard treatment. Over one year it did, and with far fewer multiple pregnancies. The International Society for Mild Approaches in Assisted Reproduction (ISMAAR) was founded to promote such mild approaches, with Fauser among its founding figures.

== Editorial and organisational roles ==
Fauser was Editor-in-Chief of Human Reproduction Update from 2000 to 2006, a role recorded in the journal when his successor took over. He went on to serve as Editor-in-Chief of Reproductive Biomedicine Online from 2015 to 2022. He served as President of the International Society of IVF (ISIVF) in the late 2010s, and since 2020 has held the position of Scientific Director at the International Federation of Fertility Societies (IFFS).

== Honours and recognition ==
In 2017, Fauser was appointed a Knight in the Order of the Netherlands Lion. Further honours include:

- International member, United States National Academy of Medicine (2019)
- Member, Academia Europaea (elected 2023)
- Honorary member, European Society of Human Reproduction and Embryology (2019)
- Fellow ad eundem, Royal College of Obstetricians and Gynaecologists (2016)
- Dexeus clinical scientist award, Barcelona (2012)

== Selected publications ==
- Rotterdam ESHRE/ASRM-Sponsored PCOS Consensus Workshop Group (2004). "Revised 2003 consensus on diagnostic criteria and long-term health risks related to polycystic ovary syndrome (PCOS)". Human Reproduction. 19 (1): 41–47. doi:10.1093/humrep/deh098. PMID 14688154.
- de Vet A, Laven JS, de Jong FH, Themmen AP, Fauser BC (2002). "Antimüllerian hormone serum levels: a putative marker for ovarian aging". Fertility and Sterility. 77 (2): 357–362. doi:10.1016/S0015-0282(01)02993-4. PMID 11821097.
- Heijnen EM, Eijkemans MJ, De Klerk C, Polinder S, Beckers NG, Klinkert ER, Broekmans FJ, Passchier J, Te Velde ER, Macklon NS, Fauser BC (2007). "A mild treatment strategy for in-vitro fertilisation: a randomised non-inferiority trial". The Lancet. 369 (9563): 743–749. doi:10.1016/S0140-6736(07)60360-2. PMID 17336650.
- Aleixandre-Benavent R, Simon C, Domenech-Garcia V, Muñiz-Roca J, Montagut-Garcia L, Fauser BC (2015). "Trends in clinical reproductive medicine research: 10 years of growth". Fertility and Sterility. 104 (1): 131–137. doi:10.1016/j.fertnstert.2015.04.007. PMID 25936232.
- Fauser BC, Adamson GD, Boivin J (2024). "Declining global fertility rates and the implications for family planning and family building: an IFFS consensus document". Human Reproduction Update. 30 (2): 153–173. doi:10.1093/humupd/dmad028. PMC 10905510. PMID 38197291.
- Fauser BC, Bhattacharya S, Boivin J (2025). "Expanding fertility awareness and choices: a public health imperative". The Lancet. 50 (4). doi:10.1016/j.rbmo.2024.104787. PMID 40287202.
