= Alexander M. Feskov =

Ukrainian medical researcher

- Александр Михайлович Феськов
- Born: February 17, 1959 (age 67); Alchevsk, Ukraine
- Citizenship: Ukrainian
- Occupations: Physician and medical researcher
- Known for: Reproductive technology and Fertility treatment
- Website: Feskov Human Reproduction Group

Alexander M. Feskov (born 17 February 1959 in Alchevsk, Ukraine) is a Ukrainian physician, reproductive scientist, and ultrasonographer who specialises in reproductive technology and fertility treatment.

Feskov is one of the most well-known reproductive technology and surrogacy specialists in Ukraine, and has over 100 academic publications. Other notable physicians who have done related research include Yury Verlinsky, Lars Johanson, and Norbert Gleicher.

He is a member of the European Society of Human Reproduction and Embryology (ESHRE), and is also a member of the board of Ukrainian Association of Reproductive Medicine.

== Education ==
Born in Alchevsk, Ukraine, Feskov was an intern in obstetrics and gynecology at the 1st City Clinical Hospital in Kharkiv, Ukraine. He then went on to graduate from the Faculty of Medicine at Kharkov Medical Institute in 1990.

== Career ==
Feskov has been working in the field of reproductive medicine for more than three decades. He specialises primarily in obstetrics and gynecology, endoscopy, and ultrasonography.

Feskov has done extensive medical research on sperm fertility, in vitro fertilization, and various other reproductive technologies and treatments. He has 3 Ukrainian patents, as well as various U.S. patents relating to reproductive technology. Feskov is currently based in Kharkiv, Ukraine as the founder and manager of Feskov Human Reproduction Group, one of Ukraine's largest and most notable surrogacy agencies.

== Affiliations ==
Feskov is a member of:

- European Society of Human Reproduction and Embryology (ESHRE)
- Committee of the Ukrainian Association of Reproductive Medicine (UARM)
- Association of Obstetricians and Gynecologists of Ukraine and Russia
- American Society for Reproductive Medicine (ASRM)

== Selected publications ==
Feskov is the author of more than 160 scientific papers. Some of his selected papers are listed below.

2014

- Influence of the dose of recombinant FSH and the level of estradiol on the morphokinesis of embryos and the result of IVF in women with hyperandrogenism: Thirteenth Danilevsky Readings. Materials of Research and Practice Conference with international participation. — Kharkiv, 2014. P. 144

2013

- Influence of the progesterone level in the cycles of ovulation stimulation on the quality of embryos and onset of pregnancy in FIV programs in women with different androgenic status.: Twelfth Danilevsky Readings. Materials of Research and Practice Conference with international participation, Kharkov, — 2013. P. 127—128
- Allelic polymorphisms of folate metabolism genes in men with impaired reproductive function: Reproduction Problems 1/2013, p. 70-72.
- Outcome of treatment by means of ART after transfer of embryo after PGD with the use of time lapse monitoring system: RAHR, Volgograd, 2013
- Vitrification of ovarian tissue as a method of preservation of oocytes of early stages of development: RAHR, Volgograd 2013
- Advantages of treatment of patients with endometrioid cysts before IVF program: RAHR, Volgograd, 2013
- Significance of microsalpingoscopy in the choice of treatment of women with tubal factor infertility: Women’s health. — 2013. – No. 4(80).- P.139-140
- Effectiveness of treatment of women with thrombophilia in ART programs: Women’s health. — 2013. – No. 4(80).- P.147-148
- Vitrification of ovarian tissue as a method of preservation of oocytes of early stages of development. Reproduction problems No. 5, 2013, p. 64-65

2012

- Study of aneuploidy of chromosomes х, у, 18, 21 in the nuclei of spermatozoa in men with astheno- and oligoasthenozoospermia. Reproduction problems. −2012. – No. 1. — P. 77-78
- Analysis of correlation between anomaly of morphology and presence of chromosome impairments in the nuclei of spermatozoa in men with astheno-, oligo- and teratozoospermia. Taurian Medical and Biological Bulletin. — 2012. — Volume 15, No. 2, p. 2 (58). -P. 191—193
- Echographic control of the first trimester of pregnancy in families with impaired reproductive function. Taurian Medical and Biological bulletin. — 2012. — Volume 15, No. 2, p. 1 (58). -P. 74-76
- Progesterone level and prognosis for onset of pregnancy in the cycles of controlled ovarian stimulation. Taurian Medical and Biological Bulletin. — 2012. — Volume 15, No. 2, p. 1 (58). - P. 322—323
- Connection of anti-Müllerian hormone with the level of estradiol and fertilization potential of oocytes in women of different age with polycystic ovary syndrome in the cycles of fertilization in vitro. „Endocrine Pathology in the Aspect of Age” Kharkov 1–2 November 2012 P. 78-79

2011

- Preimplantation Genetic Diagnosis of the embryos of the patients with aneuploidy in the nuclei of spermatozoa on chromosomes 18, 21,Х, Y. Reproduction problems. — No. 3. — 2011. — P. 80-81
- Influence of hyperandrogenism on the morphology of oocytes, embryos and the frequency of chromosome pathology in the cycles of fertilization in vitro. Bulletin of problems of biology and medicine. — 2011. — Issue 2, Vol.1. — P. 171—175
- Influence of genotypic features of infertile couples on the effectiveness of fertilization in vitro. Achievements and perspectives of experimental and clinical endocrinology (Tenth Danilevsky Readings): Materials of Research and Practice Conference with international participation, — Kharkiv, 3–4 March 2011. — P. 32-34.
- Modified protocol of controlled ovarian stimulation in women with reduced ovarian reserve in ART programs. Taurian Medical and Biological Bulletin. — Vol. 14. — No. 14. — 2011. — P. 241—243[17]
- Preimplantation Genetic Diagnosis of the embryos of the patients with aneuploidy in the nuclei of spermatozoa on chromosomes Х, Y, 18. Bulletin of problems of biology and medicine. — 2011. — Issue 1. — P. 259—261
- Influence of the hormonal profile of follicular fluid on the result of fertilization in vitro according to the androgen status of women. Achievements and perspectives of experimental and clinical endocrinology (Tenth Danilevsky Readings): Materials of Research and Practice Conference with international participation, — Kharkiv, 3–4 March 2011. — P. 114—115.

2010

- Impact of preimplantation genetic diagnosis on assisted reproductive technologies results. Reproductive BioMedicine Online. — 2010 — P. 79 (176)
- Influence of microenvironment of oocytes on the result of extracorporeal fertilization in hyperandrogenism. Problems of endocrine pathology.- 2010.- No.3.- P. 57-63.
- Preimplantation Genetic Diagnosis of embryos of the patients with aneuploidy of chromosomes. Reproductive technologies today and tomorrow: ХХ annual international conference RAHR, Nizhny Novgorod, 6–8 September 2010.- Nizhny Novgorod, 2010.- P.30.
- Features of microenvironment of oocytes and morphology of embryos in extracorporeal fertilization in women with hyperandrogenism. Bulletin of problems of Biology and Medicine. −2010.- Issue. 2. P. 133—139.
- Study of influence of intrauterine administration of peripheral blood mononuclear cells on the frequency of embryo implantation in patients during treatment by means of FIV. Journal “Bulletin of Biology and Medicine”.
- Features of hormonal and antioxidant microenvironment of oocytes in women with hyperandrogenism. Achievements and perspectives of experimental and clinical endocrinology (Ninth Danilevsky Readings): Materials of Research and Practice Conference with international participation, — Kharkiv, 2–3 March 2010. — P. 125—127.
