= Mary Lake Polan =

Obstetrician and gynecologist

- Born: 1943 (age 82–83); Las Vegas, New Mexico, US
- Occupations: Obstetrician; Gynecologist
- Years active: 1978–current
- Known for: Research and outreach on infertility and in-vitro fertilization
- Notable work: Second Seed (1988)

Mary Lake Polan (born 1943) is an American obstetrician and gynecologist whose research on genetics and hormones involved in reproductive endocrinology, along with her fiction and non-fiction books on related subjects, helped normalize the general public's understanding of in-vitro fertilization during the 1970s through the 1990s. A Las Vegan, she grew up in the aftermath of World War II in a large Jewish family and developed an interest in medicine due to her father's work in ophthalmology.

Having a varied education at several institutions growing up, along with multiple trips abroad to Europe to study, Polan eventually began doing research and teaching at Yale and Stanford. She would continue doing international trips to both learn about and spread knowledge of reproductive medicine to other countries, including Iran, China, and Eritrea. In 1988, she published a popular science mystery novel that went into detail on how in-vitro fertilization is practiced, giving insights that lessened public fears about the new technologies involved.

A member of multiple professional societies and organizations, she was also made a member of multiple governmental committees and organization boards involved in women's medicine and health. She was named a "Giant in Obstetrics and Gynecology" by the American Journal of Obstetrics and Gynecology in 2022 for her work.

== Childhood and education ==
=== Early years ===
Born in 1943 in Las Vegas, New Mexico to an Army ophthalmologist father from Lithuania and a nurse mother from Norway, Polan was raised during the end of World War II while her father was stationed for two years in her childhood in the Azores. Her family then moved to Huntington, West Virginia with her and her younger brother, the wilderness and escapades in the mountainous region being formative in her pre-teen and teen years. She had extensive interactions with the rest of her Jewish family that lived in the area and worked on the family business, first manufacturing bombsights during the war and then moving into optical lenses. She was sent to the private Emma Willard School in Troy, New York for her high school years. Due to her father taking her with him on his surgical duties, she obtained an early interest in medicine and became a summer ward clerk for the town's hospital at age 17.

=== Degrees and abroad ===
For university, she attended Connecticut College to receive her bachelor's degree, though made several trips abroad for the learning experience. Her freshman year as a part of the "Experiment in International Living" program had her travel to Switzerland. Then, in her junior year, she went to Paris, France as a part of the Smith College Junior Year Abroad Program. She went on to graduate cum laude in the 1965 class at Connecticut College with a degree in chemistry. She continued with her studies at Yale University's School of Medicine and received a Ph.D. in molecular biophysics and biochemistry five years later in 1970. Starting a postdoctoral fellowship in the Yale lab of Joseph G. Gall, she researched how to isolate the circular components found in the mitochondrial DNA of the model organism Drosophila melanogaster.

=== Medicine and women's health ===
Wanting to begin a career in medicine, she was required to obtain a medical degree, which she did in 1975 from the same school. She also did her residency at the Yale School of Medicine in it obstetrics and gynecology department, becoming the first woman to complete a residency in the department. The last several months of her residency in 1978 also saw her spend time in hospitals in Shiraz, Iran, which would later provide inspiration for her medical mystery novel. The new discoveries in infertility technologies had Polan start a reproductive endocrinology fellowship with Nathan Kase and Alan DeCherney.

Later in her life, she wanted to branch out into other areas of women's health, so she enrolled at the University of California, Berkeley to get a public health degree as a part of the university's Maternal and Child Health Program. She completed the degree in 2001.

== Career ==
=== Yale professorship ===
After completing her residency and fellowship, Polan became an assistant professor and lecturer at the Yale School of Medicine until 1990, with her initial research program being funded on an NIH grant that focused on how hormone production is conducted in the granulosa-luteal cells of humans. Her fellowship time period also involved interaction with John McLean Morris, who suggested Polan get involved in the Yale-China Program that sent undergraduates as English teachers in Changsha, China.

For this purpose, Polan and her family spent four months in 1986 at Changsha while teaching at the Second Affiliated Hospital. The research she was exposed to led her to start also focusing on the relationship of cytokinins and interleukin-1 to the process of reproduction. By 1987, she was promoted to an associate professor and conducted surgery at Yale New Haven Hospital in addition to doing lab research.

=== Stanford professorship and appointments ===
After leaving her position at Yale in 1990, Polan and her family moved to Palo Alto, California where she became a professor at the Stanford University School of Medicine and the department chair for obstetrics and gynecology. She was also awarded the position as the Katharine Dexter McCormick and Stanley McCormick Memorial Professor. While conducting her work as professor, she also joined the company boards of Wyeth and Quidel.

In 1991, she was made co-chair of the Task Force on Opportunities for Research on Women's Health by the National Institutes of Health and was later appointed to the Director's Panel on Clinical Research, where she stayed from 1995 to 1998. During the same time period, in 1993, she was added as a member of the National Academy of Medicine and made a part of its Governing Council, which she remained on until 2005. The Secretary of the Department of Health and Human Services at the time, Tommy Thompson, made her a part of the US government's Secretary's Advisory Committee on Human Research Protections until 2006.

After obtaining a public health degree, Polan traveled to Asmara, Eritrea in 2002 after creating the Eritrean Women's Project to help treat fistulas resulting from lengthy childbirths. A primary goal has been to establish a center for gynecological support and patient education at the main hospital of the capital city. She would go on to become a visiting adjunct professor at the Columbia University School of Medicine and moving to New York City for the visiting period. She then returned to Yale University in 2014 to once more become an obstetrics and gynecology professor in the School of Medicine, holding an endowed chair.

Throughout her academic career, Polan has published over 130 scientific papers, book chapters, and books themselves.

=== Fiction and nonfiction author ===
Throughout her work as a professor, Polan also became an author of both fictional stories and non-fictional personal biographies. She was inspired to try writing after seeing the medicine focused works of Robin Cook and wanted to do something similar, but for her field of reproductive endocrinology. Mystery novels and shows were also a favored pastime, with Murder, She Wrote being her favorite television series, thus she chose to combine her desire of medicine in fiction with a mystery setting.

She published Second Seed in 1988, basing the story around ideas she had while teaching in Shiraz during her time in Iran. She began composing the structure of the story near the end of 1984 through the use of a dictaphone before having a transcription made by a hired secretary that Polan then edited digitally. The first few chapters were finished by February 1985, which led her to approach the publisher Charles Scribner's Sons. The company approved her manuscript and awarded her a contract in January 1986 after she had completed most of the book. Her goal with the book was to "demystify" the procedures behind in-vitro fertilization and showcase the kind of medicine that is done at infertility centers.

Polan then began writing in 2002 the pieces that would become A Doctor's Journey: What I Learned about Women, Healing and Myself in Eritrea. Based around the time period she spent on the women's project in Eritrea, it focuses on the experiences and stories of the doctors and nurses in the country and the relationship they formed with the American doctors involved in the project.

== Research ==
The research focus of Polan's work has primarily been on reproductive endocrinology and infertility, with her later career also investigating the genetic causes of uterine fibroids and the expression of genes in their formation. Her later work on interleukin-1 (IL-1) found that, during the menstrual cycle and specifically the luteal phase, IL-1 was significantly increased in both the ovarian cells and in those types that make up the peripheral blood mononuclear cells. This increase also occurs in the midcycle phase. She went on to show that the IL-1 production system is also manipulated in other menstrual phases and is involved in inhibiting ovulation in a time-dependent manner. Her lab found that a receptor antagonist in the system does this inhibition and can prevent implantation by altering the cells in the vaginal endometrial endothelium.

In 2001, she was sponsored to test the effectiveness of herbal supplements on libido through a double blind randomized controlled trial that she then presented at the 9th annual Congress on Women's Health and Gender-Based Medicine. She found that ArginMax, a supplement available in Canada, did increase sexual drive, but only through improvement of nutritional well-being and was "no female Viagra".

== Organizations ==
Polan is a member of multiple professional academic organizations. As a committee chair, she has help positions in the National Academy of Medicine, the American Society for Reproductive Medicine, and the American Medical Women's Association. She has also been made a fellow of the American College of Obstetrics and Gynecology.

== Awards and honors ==
During her senior year at Connecticut College, Polan received an excellence in chemistry award from the local branch of the American Chemical Society after her presentation at a science conference at Trinity College. Given the Connecticut College Medal in 1992, she was recognized by the college as someone whose efforts has helped improve the recognition of the organization, due to her years of serving as an emeritus trustee. She was also chosen by the American Journal of Obstetrics and Gynecology as a "Giant in Obstetrics and Gynecology" and a member of their journal series on such individuals.

== Personal life ==
Polan married professor of pediatric dermatology Joseph Smith McGuire after having him as a mentor at Yale University. They had three children together. She was later married to Frank Bennack Jr. in April 2005.

== Bibliography ==
- —; DeCherney, Alan H. (1987). Reproductive Surgery. Year Book Medical Publishers. p. 335. ISBN 9780815123750.
- — (1987). Second Seed: A Novel. Scribner's Sons. p. 280. ISBN 9780684187358.
- —; Henzl, Milan R., eds. (1993). The Clinical Use of GnRH Superactive Analogues. W. B. Saunders. p. 219.
- —; Henzl, Milan R.; Hornstein, Mark D. (1998). The Second Decade of GnRH Agonists: In Vitro Fertilization and Endometriosis: a Symposium. Journal of Reproductive Medicine Incorporated. p. 92.
- — (October 27, 2016). A Doctor's Journey: What I Learned About Women, Healing, and Myself in Eritrea. She Writes Press. p. 40. ISBN 9781940838861.
- —; Chin, Toyna; Garrett, Holly (July 10, 2018). The Big P: A Younger Girl's Journey Through Puberty. Toyna Chin. p. 44. ISBN 9780692155202.
