= Environmental toxicant =

Environmental toxicant may refer to:

- Toxicant (a toxic substance) in the environment, whether biologically or artificially made
  - Environmental toxin, a biologically created toxicant in the environment
- Environmental pollutant, an entity causing undesired effects in an environment

== See also ==
- Environmental toxicology
- Environmental toxicants and fetal development
- Pollution and reproduction
