= John Aubrey Rock Sr. =

American physician and academic administrator

John Aubrey Rock Sr. is an American obstetrician-gynecologist, reproductive endocrinologist, researcher, medical educator, and academic administrator. He has held faculty and leadership positions at academic institutions in the United States and the United Arab Emirates. He is the Founding Dean Emeritus of the Herbert Wertheim College of Medicine at Florida International University and Chancellor Emeritus of the Louisiana State University Health Sciences Center in New Orleans.

== Early life and education ==
Rock received a Bachelor of Science degree in zoology from Louisiana State University in 1968 and a Doctor of Medicine degree from the Louisiana State University Medical Center in New Orleans in 1972. He completed a residency in obstetrics and gynecology at Duke University Medical Center in 1976 and a fellowship in reproductive endocrinology at Johns Hopkins University Medical Center in 1978. In 2003, he earned a Master of Science in Health Care Management from the Harvard T.H. Chan School of Public Health.

== Academic and administrative career ==
Rock began his academic career at the Johns Hopkins University School of Medicine, where he held several positions in the Department of Gynecology and Obstetrics. His roles included Director of the Division of Reproductive Endocrinology and Deputy Director of the department. During his tenure at Johns Hopkins, he directed clinical and research programs and helped establish the institution's in vitro fertilization program.

In collaboration with the National Aeronautics and Space Administration, Rock participated in work related to the development and testing of an expandable surgical chamber intended for use in weightless conditions.

In the early 1990s, Rock was appointed Chair of the Department of Obstetrics and Gynecology at Union Memorial Hospital. He later served as Chair of the Department of Gynecology and Obstetrics at Emory University School of Medicine, where he contributed to departmental restructuring and the expansion of research programs.

From 2002 to 2006, Rock served as Chancellor of the Louisiana State University Health Sciences Center in New Orleans. In that role, he oversaw strategic planning, helped establish the School of Public Health, and coordinated institutional responses following Hurricane Katrina. He also had administrative responsibility related to the state’s Charity Hospital System and the Health Care Services Division of Louisiana State University.

In 2006, Rock became the founding dean of the Herbert Wertheim College of Medicine at Florida International University, where he also served as Senior Vice President for Health Affairs. Under his leadership, the college received accreditation, developed academic programs, and launched its faculty practice network. He served in this role until 2019 and later received the title of Founding Dean Emeritus.

From 2018 to 2023, Rock served as Founding Dean and Senior Vice President for Health Affairs at the College of Medicine and Health Sciences at Khalifa University in Abu Dhabi, United Arab Emirates. In this role, he oversaw the launch and accreditation process of a U.S.-style allopathic medical school.

== Publications and research ==
Rock has published in the fields of reproductive endocrinology, gynecology, infertility, female pelvic reconstructive surgery, and medical education. His academic work includes peer-reviewed journal articles, book chapters, and textbooks.

He was one of the editors of Reproductive Endocrinology, Surgery, and Technology. He also served as an editor of Te Linde's Operative Gynecology.

== Professional affiliations and leadership roles ==
Rock has held leadership roles in several professional medical societies. He served as president of the American Society for Reproductive Medicine, as well as the Society of Reproductive Surgeons, the Society of Gynecologic Surgeons, and the World Endometriosis Society.

He has also served on advisory committees associated with the American College of Surgeons and the Association of American Medical Colleges, and he was a professional member of the Liaison Committee on Medical Education. He is a fellow of the American College of Obstetricians and Gynecologists and the American College of Surgeons, and he was awarded fellowship ad eundem by the Royal College of Obstetricians and Gynaecologists.

== Recognition ==
Rock has received honors from academic institutions and medical organizations. His recognitions include the Distinguished Surgeon Award from the American Society for Reproductive Medicine, the FIU Medallion for University Service, and recognition by the Johns Hopkins Society of Scholars.

== Selected publications ==
Department of Gynecology and Obstetrics, the Johns Hopkins University School of Medicine, the Johns Hopkins Hospital: The First 100 Years, edited by John A. Rock, Timothy R. B. Johnson, and J. Donald Woodruff. “Ambiguous genitalia with perineoscrotal hypospadias in 46, XY individuals: long-term medical, surgical, and psychosexual outcome.” Reproductive Endocrinology, Surgery, and Technology, edited by Eli Y. Adashi, John A. Rock, and Zev Rosenwaks. “A computer-based system for patient care and research management in reproductive endocrinology.” “A comparison of the reproductive outcome between women with a unicornuate uterus and women with a didelphic uterus.” Te Linde's Operative Gynecology. Pediatric and Adolescent Gynecology. “Applying North American medical education accreditation standards internationally in the United Arab Emirates.”
