= Environmental toxicants and fetal development =

Effect of toxins of development of the fetus

Environmental toxicants and fetal development is the impact of different toxic substances from the environment on the development of the fetus. This article deals with potential adverse effects of environmental toxicants on the prenatal development of both the embryo or fetus, as well as pregnancy complications. The human embryo or fetus is relatively susceptible to impact from adverse conditions within the mother's environment. Substandard fetal conditions often cause various degrees of developmental delays, both physical and mental, for the growing baby. Although some variables do occur as a result of genetic conditions pertaining to the father, a great many are directly brought about from environmental toxins that the mother is exposed to.

Various toxins pose a significant hazard to fetuses during development. A 2011 study found that virtually all US pregnant women carry multiple chemicals, including some banned since the 1970s, in their bodies. Researchers detected polychlorinated biphenyls, organochlorine pesticides, perfluorinated compounds, phenols, polybrominated diphenyl ethers, phthalates, polycyclic aromatic hydrocarbons, perchlorate PBDEs, compounds used as flame retardants, and dichlorodiphenyltrichloroethane (DDT), a pesticide banned in the United States in 1972, in the bodies of 99 to 100 percent of the pregnant women they tested. Among other environmental estrogens, bisphenol A (BPA) was identified in 96 percent of the women surveyed. Several of the chemicals were at the same concentrations that have been associated with negative effects in children from other studies and it is thought that exposure to multiple chemicals can have a greater impact than exposure to only one substance.

== Effects ==
Environmental toxicants can be described separately by what effects they have, such as structural abnormalities, altered growth, functional deficiencies, congenital neoplasia, or even death for the fetus.

=== Preterm birth ===
One in ten US babies are born preterm and about 5% have low birth weight. Preterm birth, defined as birth at less than 37 weeks of gestation, is a major contributor of infant mortality throughout childhood. Exposures to environmental toxins such as lead, tobacco smoke, and DDT have been linked with an increased risk for spontaneous abortion, low birth weight, or preterm birth.

=== Structural congenital abnormality ===
Toxic substances that are capable of causing structural congenital abnormalities can be termed teratogens. They are agents extrinsic to embryo or fetus which exert deleterious effects leading to increased risk of malformation, carcinogenesis, mutagenesis, altered function, deficient growth or pregnancy wastage. Teratogens are classified in four main categories:

- Drugs in pregnancy – in addition to environmental chemicals, includes recreational drug use and pharmaceutical drugs.
- Vertically transmitted infections
- Radiation, such as X-rays
- Mechanical forces, such as oligohydramnios

Teratogens affect the fetus by various mechanism including:

- Interfering with cell proliferation rate, such as viral infection and ionization
- Altered biosynthetic pathways, as seen in chromosomal defects
- Abnormal cellular or tissue interactions, as seen in diabetes
- Extrinsic factors
- Threshold interaction of genes with environmental teratogens

=== Neurodevelopmental disorder ===
Neuroplastic effects of pollution can give rise to neurodevelopmental disorders.

Autism spectrum disorder (ASD) is a neurodevelopmental disorder that presents as deficits in social interactions, and communications. These deficits can vary in strength and impairment in day-to-day function. This could be alexithymia, aggressive behaviors, difficulty regulating emotions, repetitive behavior, and lack of empathy. ASD is known to have many factors some including epigenetic, genetic, and environmental. These findings regarding autism are controversial, however, with many researchers believing that increasing rates in certain areas are a consequence of more accurate screening and diagnostic methods.

== Toxicants and their effects ==
Substances which have been found to be particularly harmful are lead (which is stored in the mother's bones), cigarette smoke, alcohol, mercury (a neurological toxicant consumed through fish), carbon dioxide, and ionizing radiation.

=== Alcohol ===
Drinking alcohol in pregnancy can result in a range of disorders known as fetal alcohol spectrum disorders. The most severe of these is fetal alcohol syndrome. These two conditions can lead to a large range of defects that can affect the fetus physically, cognitively, neurodevelopmentally, and can cause neurobehavioral deficits. These changes are dependent on severity of alcohol use and the timing during gestation. The physical characteristics of FAS could include facial abnormalities, growth deficit, and dysfunction of central nervous system development. Even more so behavioral and emotional differences are also very common in patients with FAS.

=== Tobacco smoke ===
Fetal exposure to prenatal tobacco smoke may experience a wide range of behavioral, neurological, and physical difficulties. Adverse effects include stillbirth, placental disruption, prematurity, lower mean birth weight, physical birth defects (cleft palate etc.), decrements in lung function, increased risk of infant mortality.

=== Mercury ===
Elemental mercury and methylmercury are two forms of mercury that may pose risks of mercury poisoning in pregnancy. Methylmercury, a worldwide contaminant of seafood and freshwater fish, is known to produce adverse nervous system effects, especially during brain development. Eating fish is the main source of mercury exposure in humans and some fish may contain enough mercury to harm the developing nervous system of an embryo or fetus, sometimes leading to learning disabilities. Mercury is present in many types of fish, but it is mostly found in certain large fish. One well-documented case of widespread mercury ingestion and subsequent fetal development complication took place in the 1950s in Minamata Bay, Japan. Used by a nearby industrial plant in the manufacture of plastics, methyl mercury was discharged into the waters of Minamata Bay, where it went on to be ingested regularly by many villagers who used the fish living in the bay as a dietary staple. Soon, many of the inhabitants who had been consuming the mercury-laden meat began experiencing negative effects from ingesting the toxin; however, the mercury especially impacted pregnant women and their fetuses, resulting in a high rate of miscarriage. Surviving infants exposed to mercury in-utero had extremely high rates of physical and intellectual disabilities, as well as physical abnormalities from exposure in the womb during key stages in fetal physical development. The United States Food and Drug Administration and the Environmental Protection Agency advise pregnant women not to eat swordfish, shark, king mackerel and tilefish and limit consumption of albacore tuna to 6 ounces or less a week.

High mercury levels in newborns in Gaza are theorized to originate from war weaponry.

Mercury exposure in pregnancy may also cause limb defects.

=== Lead ===
Adverse effects of lead exposure in pregnancy include miscarriage, low birth weight, neurological delays, anemia, encephalopathy, paralysis, blindness,

The developing nervous system of the fetus is particularly vulnerable to lead toxicity. Neurological toxicity is observed in children of exposed women due to the ability of lead to cross the placental barrier. A special concern for pregnant women is that some of the bone lead accumulation is released into the blood during pregnancy. Several studies have provided evidence that even low maternal exposures to lead produce intellectual and behavioral deficits in children.

=== Cadmium ===
Cadmium is a heavy metal that the United States Environmental Protection Agency classifies as a probable human carcinogen. People are often exposed to cadmium through various industrial and agricultural sources, and diet is considered the primary exposure method. The heavy metal has been shown to cause damage to the kidneys, bones, and neurological systems. Pregnant women are at higher risk of health issues from cadmium due to increased absorption of the metal during pregnancy. Cadmium can also pose health risks to the fetus, some of which may be lifelong, as it interferes with placental function and fetal development. There has been evidence of changes in birth size associated with high levels of cadmium exposure, particularly in female children. Although studies show that relatively low levels of cadmium exposure can affect pregnancy outcomes, more studies must be done to confirm these effects, establish updated exposure limitation guidelines, and explore ways to decrease exposure, particularly during pregnancy.

=== Dioxin ===
Dioxins and dioxin-like compounds persists in the environment for a long time and are widespread, so all people have some amount of dioxins in the body. Intrauterine exposure to dioxins and dioxin-like compounds have been associated with subtle developmental changes on the fetus. Effects on the child later in life include changes in liver function, thyroid hormone levels, white blood cell levels, and decreased performance in tests of learning and intelligence.

=== Air pollution ===
Air pollution can negatively affect a pregnancy resulting in higher rates of preterm births, growth restriction, and heart and lung problems in the infant.

Compounds such as carbon monoxide, sulfur dioxide and nitrogen dioxide all have the potential to cause serious damage when inhaled by an expecting mother. Low birth weight, preterm birth, intrauterine growth retardation, and congenital abnormalities have all been found to be associated with fetal exposure to air pollution. Although pollution can be found virtually everywhere, there are specific sources that have been known to release toxic substances and should be avoided if possible by those who wish to remain relatively free of toxins. These substances include, but are not limited to: steel mills, waste/water treatment plants, sewage incinerators, automotive fabrication plants, oil refineries, and chemical manufacturing plants.

Control of air pollution can be difficult. For example, in Los Angeles, regulations have been made to control pollution by putting rules on industrial and vehicle emissions. Improvements have been made to meet these regulations. Despite these improvements, the region still does not meet federal standards for ozone and particulate matter. Approximately 150,000 births occur every year in Los Angeles. Thus, any effects air pollution has on human development in utero are of great concern to those who live in this region.

Particulate matter (PM) consist of a mixture of particle pollutants that remain in the air, and vary be region. These particles are very small, ranging from PM_{10} to PM_{2.5}, which can easily enter the lungs. Particulate matter has been shown to be associated with acute cardio-respiratory morbidity and mortality. Intrauterine growth has been shown to be affected by particulate matter, leading to unhealthy outcomes for fetal development such as poor or slow fetal growth, and increasing fetal morbidity and mortality. A study from 2012 found that exposures to PM_{2.5} differed by race/ethnicity, age, as well as socioeconomic status, leading to certain populations experiencing greater negative health outcomes due to environmental pollution, especially relating to particulate matter.

=== Pesticides ===
Pesticides are created for the specific purpose of causing harm (to insects, rodents, and other pests), pesticides have the potential to cause serious damages to a developing fetus, should they be introduced into the fetal environment. Studies have shown that pesticides, particularly fungicides, have shown up in analyses of an infant's cord blood, proving that such toxins are indeed transferred into the baby's body. Overall, the two pesticides most frequently detected in cord blood are diethyltoluamide (DEET) and vinclozolin (a fungicide). Although pesticide toxicity is not as frequently mentioned as some of the other methods of environmental toxicity, such as air pollution, contamination can occur at any time from merely engaging in everyday activities such as walking down a pathway near a contaminated area, or eating foods that have not been washed properly. In 2007 alone, 1.1 billion pounds (500 kt) of pesticides were found present in the environment.

A 2013 review of 27 studies on prenatal and early childhood exposures to organophosphate pesticides found all but one showed negative neurodevelopmental outcomes. In the ten studies that assessed prenatal exposure, "cognitive deficits (related to working memory) were found in children at age 7 years, behavioral deficits (related to attention) seen mainly in toddlers, and motor deficits (abnormal reflexes), seen mainly in neonates."

A systematic review of neurodevelopmental effects of prenatal and postnatal organophosphate pesticide exposure was done in 2014. The review found that "Most of the studies evaluating prenatal exposure observed a negative effect on mental development and an increase in attention problems in preschool and school children."

In 2017, a study looked at the possible effects of agricultural pesticides in over 500,000 births in a largely agricultural region of California and compared their findings to birth outcomes in other less agriculturally dominated California areas. Overall, they found that pesticide exposure increased adverse birth outcomes by 5–9%, but only among those mothers exposed to the highest quantities of pesticides.

=== Benzenes ===
Benzene exposure in mothers has been linked to fetal brain defects especially neural tube defects. Benzene can be found in cleaning products, glue or adhesives, paint thinners or strippers, exhaust, gasoline fumes, and tobacco smoke. In one study, BTEX (benzene, toluene, ethylbenzene, xylenes) exposure during the first trimester of pregnancy has been clearly indicating negative association with biparietal brain diameter between 20 and 32 weeks of pregnancy. Women with high exposure to toluene had three to five times the miscarriage rate of those with low exposure, and women with occupational benzene exposure have been shown to have an increased rate of miscarriages. Paternal occupational exposure to toluene and formaldehyde has also been linked to miscarriage in their partners. Normal development is highly controlled by hormones, and disruption by man made chemicals can permanently change the course of development. Ambient ozone has been negatively associated with sperm concentration in men, chemicals associated with UOG operations (e.g., benzene, toluene, formaldehyde, ethylene glycol and ozone) have been associated with negative impacts on semen quality, particularly reduced sperm counts.

A 2011 study found a relationship between Neural Tube Defects and maternal exposure to benzene, a compound associated with natural gas extraction. The study found that mothers living in Texas census tracts with higher ambient benzene levels were more likely to have offspring with neural tube defects, such as spina bifida, than mothers living in areas with lower benzene levels.

=== Other ===
- Heat and noise have also been found to have significant effects on development.
- Carbon dioxide – decreased oxygen delivery to brain, intellectual deficiencies
- Ionizing radiation – miscarriage, low birth weight, physical birth defects, childhood cancers
- Environmental exposure to perchlorate in women with hypothyroidism causes a significant risk of low IQ in the child.

== Avoiding relevant environmental toxins in pregnancy ==
Organizations such as the American College of Obstetricians and Gynecologists and the American College of Nurse-Midwives recommend precautions to minimize exposure to relevant environmental toxins in pregnancy.

- Avoiding paint supplies such as stained glass material, oil paints and ceramic glazes, and instead using watercolor or acrylic paints and glazes.
- Checking the quality of the tap water or bottled water and changing water drinking habits if necessary.
- If living in a home built before 1978, checking whether lead paint has been used. If such is the case, paint that is crumbling or peeling should not be touched, a professional should remove the paint and the site should be avoided while the paint is removed or sanded.
- To decrease exposure to pesticides; washing all produce thoroughly, peeling the skin from fruits and vegetables or buying organic produce if possible.
- Avoiding any cleaning supply labeled "toxic" or any product with a warning on the label, and instead trying natural products, baking soda, vinegar and/or water to clean.

Linda Giudice, former president of the International Federation of Fertility Societies, has also published a list of steps for minimizing exposures to pollutants that may affect reproduction, including air pollution and particulate matter.

== Natural gas development ==
In a rural Colorado study of natural gas development, maternal residence within a 10-mile radius of natural gas wells was found to have a positive association to the prevalence of congenital heart defects (CHDs) and neural tube defects (NTDs). Along with this finding, a small association was found between mean birth weight and the density and proximity to the natural gas wells. Maternal exposure through natural gas wells may come in the form of benzene, solvents, polycyclic aromatic hydrocarbons (PAHs), and other air pollutants such as toluene, nitrogen dioxide, and sulfur dioxide.

In Pennsylvania, unconventional natural gas producing wells increased from zero in 2005 to 3689 in 2013. A 2016 study of 9384 mothers and 10946 neonates in the Geisinger Health System in Pennsylvania found prenatal residential exposure to unconventional natural gas development activity was associated with preterm birth and physician-recorded high-risk pregnancy. In Southwest Pennsylvania, maternal proximity to unconventional gas drilling has been found to be associated with decreased birth weight. It was unclear which route of exposure: air, soil or water could be attributed to the association. Further research and larger studies on this topic are needed.

Endocrine disruptors are compounds that can disrupt the normal development and normal hormone levels in humans. Endocrine-disrupting chemicals (EDCs) can interact with hormone receptors, as well as change hormone concentrations within the body, leading to incorrect hormone responses in the body as well as disrupt normal enzyme functioning. Oil and gas extraction has been known to contribute to EDCs in the environment, largely due to the high risk of ground and surface water contamination that comes with these extractions. In addition to water contamination, oil and gas extraction also lead to higher levels of air pollution, creating another route of exposure for these endocrine disruptors. This problem often goes under-reported, and therefore, the true magnitude of the impact is underestimated. In 2016, a study was conducted to assess the need for an endocrine component to health assessments for drilling and extraction of oil and gas in densely populated areas. With the high potential for release of oil and gas chemicals with extraction, specifically chemicals that have been shown to disrupt normal hormone production and function, the authors highly emphasized the need for a component centering around endocrine function and overall health with health assessments, and how this in turn impacts the environment.

== Role of the placenta ==
The healthy placenta is a semipermeable membrane that does form a barrier for most pathogens and for certain xenobiotic substances. However, it is by design an imperfect barrier since its main function is to transport substances required for growth and development. Placental transport can be by passive diffusion for smaller molecules that are lipid soluble or by active transport for substances that are larger and/or electrically charged. Some toxic chemicals may be actively transported. The dose of a substance received by the fetus is determined by the amount of the substance transported across the placenta as well as the rate of metabolism and elimination of the substance. As the fetus has an immature metabolism, it is unable to detoxify substances very efficiently; and as the placenta plays such an important role in substance exchange between the mother and the fetus, it goes without saying that any toxic substances that the mother is exposed to are transported to the fetus, where they can then affect development. Carbon-dioxide, lead, ethanol (alcohol), and cigarette smoke in particular are all substances that have a high likelihood of placental transferral.

Identifying potential hazards for fetal development requires a basis of scientific information. In 2004, Brent proposed a set of criteria for identifying causes of congenital malformations that also are applicable to developmental toxicity in general. Those criteria are:

- Well-conducted epidemiology studies consistently show a relationship between particular effects and exposure to the substance.
- Data trends support a relationship between changing levels of exposure and the specific effect.
- Animal studies provide evidence of the correlation between substance exposures and particular effects.

== See also ==
- Drugs in pregnancy
- Pollution and reproduction
