= Verlinsky =

Verlinsky (Russian: Верлинский) is a Russian surname. Notable people with the surname include:

- Yury Verlinsky (1943–2009), Russian-American medical researcher
- Boris Verlinsky (1888–1950), Soviet chess player
