= Gleicher =

Gleicher is a surname. Notable people with the surname include:

- Elizabeth L. Gleicher (born 1954), American lawyer and jurist
- Norbert Gleicher (born 1948), Polish-born American gynecologist
- Martha Gleicher, a name used by Martha Farkas Glaser (1921–2014), American music manager
