= Center for Human Reproduction =

Fertility clinic in New York City

- Abbreviation: CHR
- Formation: 1981; 45 years ago
- Founder: Norbert Gleicher
- Founded at: Chicago, United States
- Location: New York City, United States
- Coordinates: 40.7698°N 73.9663°W
- Fields: Reproductive medicine

The Center for Human Reproduction (CHR) is a fertility center located in New York City. It was founded by the obstetrician-gynecologist Norbert Gleicher in 1981.

== History ==
=== Creation and decade of 1980s ===
Norbert Gleicher, an obstetrician-gynecologist born in Kraków, moved to the United States to complete his fellowship in immunology in New York City and to develop his residency in obstetrics and gynecology at Mount Sinai Medical Center in Chicago. After holding positions as assistant professor in the Department of Obstetrics and Gynecology and division director of the division of Reproductive Immunology at the medical center, he founded the Center for Human Reproduction in Chicago in 1981, established as the first IVF center in the Midwest. In 1983, the center performed the worlds's first trans-vaginal egg retrieval. Five years later a manuscript was published reporting the world's first trans-vaginal tubal catheterization to open occluded fallopian tubes.

=== 1990s: New York City opening ===
With the growth of the center in Chicago, a new headquarters was opened in New York City. In 1997, the center reached an agreement with Columbia University to staff CHR NY as university's IVF program. One year later, CHR NY opened at 635 Madison Avenue including in its staff the American physician Mark V. Sauer, who was then Head of the Reproductive Endocrinology Division at Columbia. Sauer became the center's Medical Director and Dr. Andrea Vidali, also from Columbia University's division of reproductive endocrinology, was included in CHR's team of professionals. By the end of 1999, Gleicher was in charge of both centers in Chicago and New York City, splitting his time each week between the two cities.

=== New millennium and present ===
In 2000, 21 E 69th Street location was purchased as the new site of CHR in New York City. This location was opened on September 10, 2001, the night before the September 11 attacks. In 2003, Gleicher sold the Chicago operations to Reproductive Genetics Institute with a one-year transition period, and moved full-time back to New York City. That same year, David H. Barad, MD, MS, previously Head of Reproductive Endocrinology/IVF Division at Albert Einstein College of Medicine, joined the center as Clinical Director of Assisted Reproductive Technologies. With the inclusion of Barad, the center's research focus on ovarian aging tightened.

In 2005, CHR published the first manuscript on the use of DHEA supplementation for female fertility in Fertility & Sterility international journal. CHR published in 2008 the first manuscript about the danger of preimplantation genetic screening after performing some analyses that proved the low effectiveness of this procedure in improving the chances of pregnancy in IVF.

Around 2010, the center started a research collaboration with Dr. Aritro Sen's laboratory at the University of Rochester Medical Center. This collaboration resulted in several publications related to the crucial role androgen play in female fertility. Three years later, the center published the first report of IVF success rate manipulation, leading to CDC and SART to update report guidelines to close a loophole. In 2015, CHR established "What's My Fertility", an online risk screening tool for young women to detect risk of developing premature ovarian aging (POA) and associated infertility later in life.

In 2017, the center reported the oldest pregnancy and live birth in an almost 48-year-old woman, after an IVF procedure with her own eggs. In 2018 and 2019, the CHR website won the eHealthcare Leadership Award in Best Healthcare Content, in Medical Practice/Outpatient Facility category. During the COVID-19 outbreak in New York City in 2020, the center remained open for urgent fertility treatments.
