= Alan DeCherney =

Obstetrician and Gynecologist

- Born: Pennsylvania
- Education: Muhlenberg College - BA Temple University - MD University of Pittsburgh - Internship University of Pennsylvania - Residency
- Known for: Former American Society for Reproductive Medicine (ASRM) president (1995) Former Fertility and Sterility editor (1997 -2011) Former Society for Reproductive Investigation president (1994-1995)
- Spouse: DeeDee DeCherney
- Children: Two
- Scientific career
- Workplaces: National Institute's of Health

Alan H. DeCherney is an Obstetrician and Gynecologist who specializes in reproductive endocrinology & infertility. He is experienced in reproductive and endocrinology, infertility, and reproductive genetics.

Dr. DeCherney earned a B.A. from Muhlenberg College and an M.D. from Temple University. He did his residency at the University of Pennsylvania and internship at the University of Pittsburgh; he was also a research fellow at the Lister Institute in London, England. From 1982 to 1991, DeCherney directed the Reproductive Endocrinology division at Yale University. Then he worked as the director of the Reproductive Endocrinology division at the University of California, Los Angeles from 1996 to 2006.

He is a Fellow of the American College of Obstetricians and Gynecologists. He has served as president of the American Society for Reproductive Medicine (ASRM), the Society for Reproductive Endocrinology and Infertility (SREI), the Society of Reproductive Surgeons (SRS), the Society of Assisted Reproductive Technology, and the Society for Gynecologic Investigation. He also served as the Editor in chief for Fertility and Sterility from 1997 to 2011, and publish numerous articles that help shape the field of REI.

He was formerly the John Slate Ely Professor of Obstetrics and Gynecology at Yale University, the Phaneuf Professor and Chair of Obstetrics and Gynecology at Tufts University, the president of the American Society for Reproductive Medicine. Currently he works as Director of the Program in Reproductive and Adult Endocrinology and Chief, Reproductive Biology and Medicine Branch of the Eunice Kennedy Shriver National Institute of child Health and Human Development (NICHD) of the National Institutes of Health.

Dr. DeCherney was a pioneer when IVF was first performed successfully in the United States. He was among a handful of physicians who treated some of the earliest patients. Over the years, Dr. DeCherney has mentored more than 100 Reproductive Endocrinologists.

== List of Firsts ==
Dr. DeCherney has been associated with the development of several treatments and procedures used in reproductive endocrinology and infertility.

=== Medical ===
- First Ectopic Pregnancy removal with a Laparoscopes
- Mention of Discriminatory Zone for Diagnosis Ectopic Pregnancy
- Endometrial Ablation with Wire Loop
- Hyskon Pump
- IVF High Dose HMG
- Started Minimally Invasive Surgery at Yale University
- First Sonohysterogram
- Withered tube (DES)
- Paper on Aging and Fertility (NEJM)
- CASA (Computer Assisted Sperm Analysis)
- First IVF Program in the Northeast, 5th in the country
- Intercede to prevent adhesions
- Empiric treatment of endometriosis
- Vaginal Probe Guide for Egg Aspiration
- Empiric IUI and HMG
- Oil soluble vs Water Soluble dye for hysterosalpingograms increasing fertility
- Homotransplantation of the human fallopian tubes
- MRI of uterine anomalies
- REI Match
- REI Fellow's Retreat
- SART Registry - 2nd President Validation Committee Chair for the CDC
- New England Journal of Medicine, Associate Editor (First OB/GYN)
- First OB/GYN as a Branch chief at the NIH

== Honors ==
| 2020 | NICHD Merit Award |
| 2020 | ASRM Lifetime Achievement Award |
| 2017 | Society of Reproductive Surgeons Distinguished Surgeon Award |
| 2016 | Society for Reproductive Investigation Lifetime Distinguished Service Award, now named the DeCherney Society of Distinguished Lifetime Service Award |
| 2016 | Elected to the Academy of Medicine |
| 2015 | IOM Committee on Ethical and Social Policy Considerations of Novel Techniques for the Prevention of Maternal Transmission of Mitochondrial DNA Diseases |
| 2011 | RESOLVE, National Infertility Association, Barbara Eck Founder's Award |
| 2011 | Faculty Award, ISMAAR International Society |
| 2010 | Nominee: 2010 Distinguished Clinical Teacher Award |
| 2010 | International Federation of Fertility Societies Honorary Member |
| 2009 | Aristotle University of Thessaloniki, Greece, Doctor Honoris Cause |
| 2008 | Recognition as Teacher and Preceptor from Howard Hughes Medical Institute |
| 2008 | AWA-WPC Physician Mentor Recognition Program Award |
| 2008 | National Institute's of Health (NIH) Director's Mentoring Award |
| 2006 | University of Bucharest, Doctor Honors Causa |
| 2002 | Temple University School of Medicine Henry B. Laughlin Alumnus of the Year Award |
| 1996 | Royal College of Obstetricians and Gynecologists: Fellow and ended Shankweiler Society Fellow: Muhlenberg College |
| 1995 | Outstanding Faculty Teaching Award, Tufts University |
| 1989 | Temple University School of Medicine Distinguished Alumnus Award |
| 1987 | President's Achievement Award from Society of Gynecologic Investigation |
| 1985 | The John Slide Ely Professor of Obstetrics & Gynecology, Yale University School of Medicine |
| 1984 | Yale University Honorary Degree, Master of Arts, Privatim |
| 1966 | Alpha Omega Alpha-Temple School of Medicine |

== Academic Appointments ==
- Instructor, Department of OB/GYN, University of Pennsylvania School of Medicine
- Professor of OB/GYN, Yale University School of Medicine
- Director, Division of Reproductive Endocrinology, Department of OB/GYN, Yale University School of Medicine
- Professor of Gynecology and Obstetrics and chairman of the department, Tufts University School of Medicine
- Professor of Gynecology and Obstetrics, and chairman of the department, UCLA School of Medicine
- Chair (Executive) of Obstetrics and Gynecology at the David Geffen School of Medicine at UCLA
- Chief of Division of Reproductive Endocrinology and Infertility at the David Geffen School of Medicine at UCLA
- Professor Emeritus, the David Geffen School of Medicine at UCLA
- Chief and Senior Investigator, Reproductive Endocrinology, Infertility and Gynecology Branch and Deputy Clinical Director for Academic Affairs at Eunice Kennedy Shriveer National Institute of Child Health and Human Development, National Institutes of Health

== Professional Organizations ==
- American Assembly, Columbia University

- American Association of Gynecologic Laparoscopists (AAGL)

- American Association of Obstetricians and Gynecologists Foundation

- American Association for History of Medicine

- American College of Obstetricians and Gynecologist (ACOG)

- American College of Surgeons

- American Society for Reproductive Medicine

- Supreme Court Historical Society

- Preimplantation Genetic Diagnosis Special Interest Group (PGD SIG)

- Academy of Medicine of Washington DC

- American Gynecological Club

- American Gynecological and Obstetrical Society

- European Society of Human Reproduction and Embryology

- National Academy of Medicine

- Pacific Coast Fertility Society

- Society for Reproductive Investigation

- Society of Gynecologic Surgeons

- Society for the Study of Reproduction

== Press Mentions ==
- Giants in Obstetrics and Gynecology Series: A profile of Alan H. DeCherney, MD
- The Heart's Desire, New York Times

== Personal life ==
Dr. DeCherney's family emigrated from Vienna at the turn of the 20th century. His great-uncle was a longtime Chair of the Department of Otorhinology at Temple University School of Medicine, who persuaded DeCherney's father to become a family practitioner. Growing up, DeCherney's father, William worked from 6 AM to 11 PM, in the office that was also their home. Alan recalls sharing meals with his father in between seeing patients. Seeing his father working hard to help his patients kindled Alan's love for medicine from an early age.

Alan met his wife, Deanna (DeeDee), when he was looking for someone to help him with an important report. After completing the manuscript, they went on a date, and were married 4 years later. DeeDee is an artist, a talented creamiest, sculptor, and interior designer. She served as the editorial director of Design Times magazine. Now she is a senior trustee of her alma mater, The University of the Arts, in Philadelphia.

Together, the DeCherneys had 2 sons, Peter and Alexander. They now live in Maryland, and are engage in a number of charitable works.
