= Norbert Gleicher =

Polish-born American OB/GYN (born 1948)

- Born: August 20, 1948 (age 78); Kraków, Poland
- Education: Medical University of Vienna
- Known for: Founding the Center for Human Reproduction (CHR)
- Children: 2
- Scientific career
- Fields: Reproductive medicine
- Workplaces: Center for Human Reproduction (CHR)

Norbert Gleicher (born August 20, 1948) is an American obstetrician-gynecologist active in obstetrical practice, in vitro fertilization, reproductive endocrinology, and reproductive immunology. He is a fellow of the American College of Obstetricians and Gynecologists (FACOG) and the American College of Surgeons (ACS) and currently serves as president, medical director and chief scientist of the Center for Human Reproduction (CHR) in New York City, a clinical fertility center that he founded in 1981. Simultaneously, he is President of the Foundation for Reproductive Medicine, a not-for-profit research foundation. Gleicher maintains additional academic appointments at Rockefeller University, and Medical University of Vienna.

== Early life and education ==
Gleicher was born in the Polish city of Kraków. In his youth he moved to Vienna, the capital of Austria, where he began his medical studies at the Medical University of Vienna in 1966. He completed his medical degree and rotating internship at the Sackler Medical School of Tel Aviv University in 1974. He later moved to New York City for a 6-month fellowship in immunology. There he completed his residency in obstetrics and gynecology in 1979 at the Mount Sinai Medical Center. During his residency he also maintained a grant-funded research laboratory, mostly pursuing research in reproductive immunology. While still a chief resident, Gleicher organized at Mount Sinai Medical Center an international congress on reproductive immunology, which led to the formation of the American Society of Reproductive Immunology (ASRI), with him being elected as the society's vice-president, and with the immunology conference becoming an annual event under the society's sponsorship. He was awarded the Dr. Solomon Silver Award in Clinical Medicine for his "ability to apply the advance in research to the practice of clinical medicine".

== Career ==
=== Beginnings ===
In 1979, Gleicher was appointed assistant professor in the Department of Obstetrics and Gynecology at Mount Sinai, division director of the Division of Reproductive Immunology and director of undergraduate (medical student affairs) and graduate education (residency program) in the department. He served in all of these functions until 1981.

Recruited to Chicago in 1981 as chairman of obstetrics and gynecology at Mount Sinai Hospital and professor of obstetrics and gynecology and immunology/microbiology at Rush Medical College, he was put in charge of rebuilding an academic teaching department in the inner city. His department established the first in vitro fertilization (IVF) program in the city of Chicago and the Midwest. Gleicher traveled for training to René Frydman's Paris-based IVF program in preparation for the program's establishment. As the number of programs in the U.S. was still minuscule then, The Chicago Tribune dedicated a two-day series of articles to its opening. In 1982 was appointed as founding editor-in-chief of The Journal of In Vitro Fertilization and Embryo Transfer (JIVF-ET), holding this position for approximately 20 years. In 1991 Gleicher was awarded Austrian Decoration for Science and Art for his work.

=== Center for Human Reproduction ===
After 10 years of building a department, Gleicher resigned his chairmanship at Mount Sinai to concentrate on management of a rapidly growing IVF center, the Center for Human Reproduction (CHR). By the end of 1999, Gleicher was in charge of IVF centers in Chicago and New York City, splitting his time each week between the two cities. In 2003, he sold the Chicago operations, and moved full-time back to New York City, where he continues to pursue both clinical care and research.

While maintaining his role in clinical patient care and research at the Center for Human Reproduction in New York, Gleicher has continued his academic work as a professor or adjunct professor at educational institutions such as Yale University, New York University, Rockefeller University, and the Medical University of Vienna.

Gleicher is a member of the American College of Obstetricians and Gynecologists, the American Society for Reproductive Medicine, and the European Society of Human Reproduction and Embryology, among other institutions related to reproductive health and general medicine. As a speaker, Gleicher has lectured at major events worldwide. In 2009, he was commissioned to deliver the Patrick Steptoe Memorial Lecture in honour of the prominent British obstetrician and gynecologist before the British Fertility Society.

== Publications ==
Since the 1970s, Gleicher has published hundreds of scientific articles, abstracts and book chapters on reproductive endocrinology and infertility. He was one of the founders of the American Journal of Reproductive Immunology, where he also served as editor-in-chief. For 30 years, he was editor of the Journal of In Vitro Fertilization and Embryo Transfer, now known as the Journal of Assisted Reproduction and Genetics. Other publications in which he served as editor or member of the editorial board include The Mount Sinai Journal of Medicine, International Journal of Obstetrics and Gynecology, Asian Pacific Journal of Reproduction and PLOS One, among others.

== Major research contributions ==
- Gleicher performed the world's first successful transvaginal egg retrieval, reported in The Lancet in 1983.
- Gleicher was the first to report on a successful transvaginal tubal catheterization to open occluded fallopian tubes.
- Gleicher led Mount Sinai Hospital Medical Center's successful push to reduce Caesarean section rates without negative impact on obstetrical outcomes.
- Gleicher and collaborators were one of the first groups to report on the unacceptably high high-order multiple pregnancy rates following intrauterine inseminations (IUIs).

== DHEA controversy ==
Gleicher, in collaboration with his CHR colleague David H. Barad, introduced androgen supplementation by way of dehydroepiandrosterone (DHEA), to improve in vitro fertilization (IVF) outcomes in women with diminished ovarian reserve in 2005. However, none of his studies used randomized, controlled trials; results have been mixed for researchers who did.

Gleicher has been criticized for recommending his own brand of DHEA to his patients without always informing them that he owns the brand. His brand costs much more than competing brands.

== Personal life ==
Gleicher is divorced and the father of two daughters. In 2019, Gleicher was the subject of a social profile in The New York Times. He lives on the Upper East Side of Manhattan.
