= Pollution and reproduction =

Effects of air pollution on reproduction

The effects of pollution on reproduction are felt globally. Pollution significantly interferes with all aspects of sexual reproduction from male and female fertility to fetal development, birth outcomes, and long-term health of offspring. The risk of adverse birth outcomes such as miscarriage, stillbirth, preterm birth, low birth weight and birth defects increase when pregnant women are exposed to air pollution.

The criteria air pollutants sulfur dioxide, nitrogen dioxide, particulate matter, carbon monoxide, ozone, and lead have been identified as harmful to human health by the World Health Organization and the U.S. Environmental Protection Agency (EPA) and are known to interfere with reproduction. Many of them are linked to the burning of fossil fuels, through vehicle use, heating and cooking. Indoor and outdoor air pollution can also contain endocrine-disrupting chemicals and microplastics that disrupt fertility, fetal development, and reproductive health.

Pollutants can be inhaled, eaten, drunk, or absorbed through skin. Steps can be taken to minimize exposures such as avoiding smoking, minimizing dust, using glass instead of plastics, carefully selecting cleaning products and cosmetics, and exercising away from heavy traffic routes. Control strategies can also be implemented to improve industrial safety and public health. Cities such as London, Paris, Bogotá and Kraków have made changes that decrease pollution.

== Demographics ==
Total fertility rates (TFRs) have fallen globally in all recorded countries since the early 1960s. It has been argued that cultural and social factors are not sufficient to explain this global decrease. For example, fertility rates in China were already falling before the introduction of social campaigns such as the "later, longer, fewer" campaign (1973–1979) or the one-child-family policy (introduced in 1979). The United Nations reported in 2022 that two-thirds of the global population live in countries with fertility rates below replacement levels.

The reduction in fertility rate over the last fifty years correlates with increasing global prosperity, but also with increasing environmental pollution. Given that all countries seem to be affected, it has been argued that environmental contamination may explain the widespread decline in fertility. As of 2022, the World Health Organization reported that 99% of the world’s population lives in places with unhealthy levels of PM_{2.5} pollution. Environmental contaminants have been shown to impact human fertility in a variety of ways.

While populations worldwide are reporting lowered reproductive ability, marginalized communities and minorities tend to be exposed to higher levels of air pollutants than majority populations. They experience higher rates of adverse reproductive outcomes. The impact of race and ethnic group was examined in a data meta-analysis of perinatal outcomes from 53 high- and upper-middle-income countries. Black women were consistently at higher risk for adverse perinatal outcomes including neonatal death, stillbirth, preterm birth, and small-for-gestational-age babies compared to white women. South Asian women were also more likely to experience adverse outcomes such as preterm birth and small-for-gestational-age babies, irrespective of geographical region. Reproduction is increasingly being examined within a framework of environmental health and reproductive justice.

== Pollutants ==
Pollutants can be inhaled, eaten, drunk, or absorbed through skin, with inhalation being the most common means of exposure. Air pollution is a volatile mixture of both gases and particles whose components differ in terms of chemical reactivity, duration of exposure, and severity of effects. Pollutants can travel long distances, and mixtures of pollutants can vary widely across both space and time depending on factors such as pollution sources, geography, and season. Such differences can make it difficult to generalize across studies. Research done in different places or at different times may attribute the effects of pollution to different components based on the mixture of pollutants present.

Measurement of individual components within mixtures and estimation of their causal effects are complicated by the presence and interactions of multiple components. In cases where a single pollutant is used as a proxy indicator for general levels of air pollution, observed effects may be misattributed to the measured pollutant, when unmeasured components of polluted air are actually responsible. Mixture analysis methods are used to measure and examine multiple components and better attribute the overall effects of air pollution to specific components.

Research has consistently shown that exposure to pollutants can affect fertility, fetal development, health of offspring in later life, and the genetics of future generations. Potential mechanisms of action by toxic environmental chemicals include oxidative stress, inflammation, changes in placental function, endocrine disruption and genetic alterations.

=== Carbon monoxide ===
Carbon monoxide (CO) is an odorless gas released by the burning of fossil fuels in fires, boilers and motor vehicle engines. CO is also released by biomass fueled-cooking and is found in firsthand and secondhand tobacco smoke. CO affects both outdoor and indoor air quality. CO from traffic-related air pollution is found in higher concentrations in areas of higher traffic volume and congestion, and in poorly ventilated traffic and parking areas.

Carbon monoxide binds to hemoglobin in red blood cells, reduces the oxygen-carrying capacity of blood, and interferes with cellular respiration. It prevents delivery of oxygen to tissues and causes cellular and tissue damage. In cases of pregnancy, the effects of carbon monoxide poisoning are much greater and longer lasting on the fetus than on the pregnant woman.

=== Nitrogen oxides ===
Nitrogen oxides (NO_{x}) are a group of highly reactive gases that contain nitrogen and oxygen. They form when fossil fuels are burned at high temperatures. Sources include heavy machinery and other motor vehicles, power generation, and a variety of industrial, commercial, and residential activities. As pollutants, NO, NO_{2}, and other nitrogen oxides are associated with increased risk and a wide range of negative health outcomes, including reproductive harms.

In the body, nitric oxide (NO) normally acts as a signaling molecule, playing a central role in physiological processes that include vasodilation, inflammation, immune responses, cell death, and gene regulation. NO is essential to the synthesis and secretion of reproductive hormones including follicle-stimulating hormone, progesterone, estrogen, luteinizing hormone, gonadotrophin, and prostaglandin. Many stages of reproduction in males and females require highly specific NO levels. In males, NO regulates key functions related to sperm motility, hyperactivation, capacitation, and maturation. In females, NO affects follicle development, menstruation, maturation of oocytes, ovulation, fertilization, implantation, embryo development, successful maintenance of pregnancy, and labor.

As pollutants, nitric oxide (NO) and nitrogen dioxide (NO_{2}) easily enter the body via the lungs and circulatory system. They can disrupt the highly sensitive activities of endogenous NO and cause harms through mechanisms such as oxidative stress, endocrine disruption, placental inflammation and the alterations in the development of stem cells or precursor cells.

=== Ozone ===
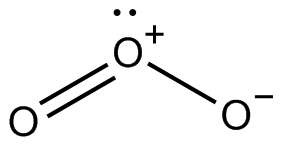
Ozone structure showing three oxygen atoms

Ground level ozone is a gas composed of three atoms of oxygen. As an air pollutant, ozone may be linked to negative reproductive outcomes. However, its effects on female fertility are not entirely clear. Under some conditions, ozone may have anti-inflammatory effects.

There is evidence that the combination of ozone with PM_{2.5} amplifies harmful effects such as oxidative stress, inflammatory processes, loss of membrane integrity, and reproductive dysfunction. Ozone may also interact with NO_{x} to create more serious effects than would occur separately.

=== Sulfur dioxide ===
Sulfur dioxide (SO_{2}) is colorless, highly reactive toxic gas. Its primary source is the burning of sulfur-containing fuels, which converts sulfur in the fuel to SO_{2}. The SO_{2} derivatives bisulfite and sulfite are widely used as food additives.

SO_{2} exposure is linked to decreased sperm quality. SO_{2} also has been linked to decreases in antral follicle count (AFC), resulting in diminished ovarian reserves in women. SO_{2} reduces DNA synthesis and may interfere with cellular repair mechanisms and increase risk of miscarriage.

=== Lead ===
Lead in the air can come from many sources, including leaded fuel. Although leaded fuel has been phased out in the United States and China, there remains lead in the soil. Among other criteria pollutants, lead can cause issues with fertility and reproduction. The presence of lead has been associated with hormonal imbalance and reproductive impairment in females. Lead exposure has been associated with decreased libido and decreased sperm quality in males.

Menstruation impairments, reduction in fertility potential, and a delay in the time of conception have been observed in females. Some of the effects of these include infertility, miscarriage, early membrane rupture, preeclampsia, pregnancy hypertension, and preterm birth. There was a series of studies done in China that was reviewed which followed women with low levels of lead exposure. There were possible links to menstrual disturbances, spontaneous abortion, and threatened abortion found in this review.

Some studies have indicated impaired maturation of germ cells into sperm cells and chromosomal damage in sperm in males exposed to lead. There has also been reduction in sperm count, morphology, and sperm motility indicated by studies.

=== Particulate matter ===
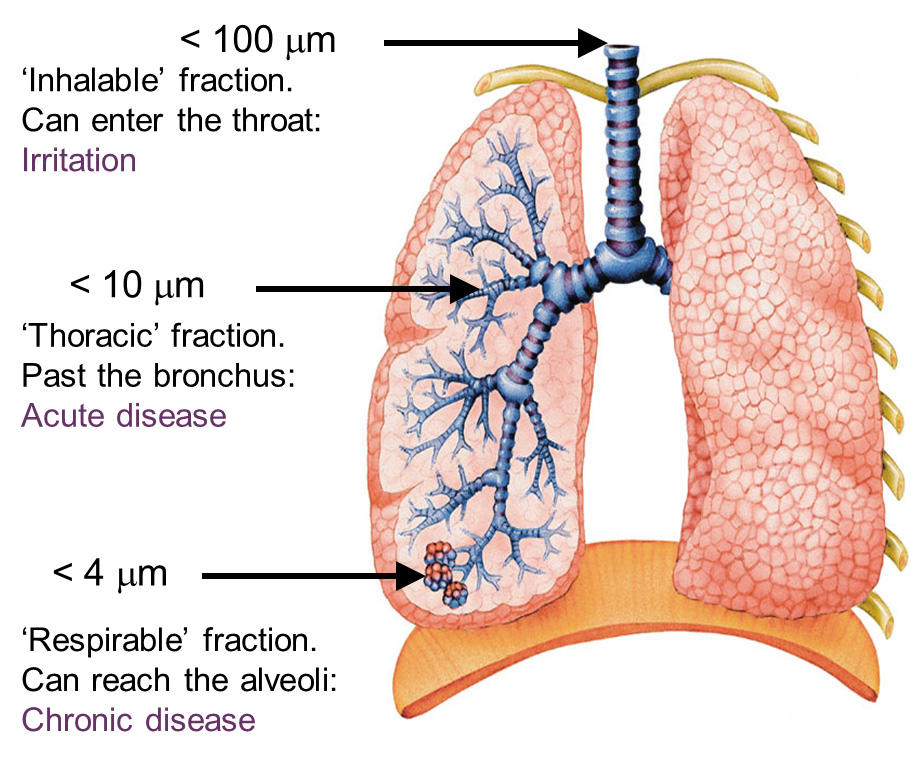
Penetration of particulate matter into the lungs depends on particle size

Particulate matter is made up of microscopic particles of solid or liquid matter suspended in the air. Inhalable coarse particles, called PM_{10}, have a particle diameter of 10 micrometers (μm) or less. Fine particles, called PM_{2.5}, have a diameter of 2.5 µm or less and are able to penetrate deeper into the lungs. Sources of particulate matter include desert dust, smoke from fires, first and second-hand tobacco and cannabis smoke, and automobile exhaust fumes from fossil fuel combustion.

PM_{2.5} has been shown to disrupt hormone levels and may affect placental health. It may contribute to reproductive toxicity through deterioration of the air-blood barrier and mechanisms of oxidative stress, inflammation, DNA damage, and cell death.

=== Polycyclic aromatic hydrocarbons ===
Standard line-angle structure of benzo-a-pyrene (BaP)

Polycyclic aromatic hydrocarbons (PAHs) are toxic, semi-volatile chemicals that are created by combustion of organic materials. PAHs such as benzo(a)pyrene (BaP) are found in exhaust fumes, cooking smoke, and tobacco smoke, among other sources.

PAHs are associated with reduced fertility. They have been reported to administer their toxic effects through oxidative stress by increasing the production of Reactive Oxygen Species (ROS) which can contribute to inflammation and cell death. Long-term exposure to PAHs can result in DNA damage and reduced repair.

=== Endocrine-disrupting chemicals ===
Endocrine-disrupting chemicals (EDCs) are a group of toxicants that include PCBs, PFAS, PBDEs, parabens, solvents, Triclosan, dioxins, pesticides, phthalates, heavy metals and Bisphenol A. EDCs have become ubiquitous environmental pollutants due to their widespread agricultural, industrial, and consumer use. EDCs can be found in commonly used cleaning and personal care products, in plastics, and in e-cigarettes. EDCs can be present in both outdoor and indoor air, as part of particulate matter, and in gaseous form as volatile organic compounds (VOCs) and semi-volatile organic compounds (SVOCs).

EDCs interfere with the body's endocrine system. They can mimic, block, or alter the effects of naturally-occurring hormones in the body that are critical to reproduction and development. Endocrine disruption can cause hormonal changes, increased oxidative stress, and genetic damage. They affect gametes, embryos, gonads, and reproductive tract development and function, and have been shown to interfere with fertility, fetal development, and reproductive health.

=== Microplastics ===
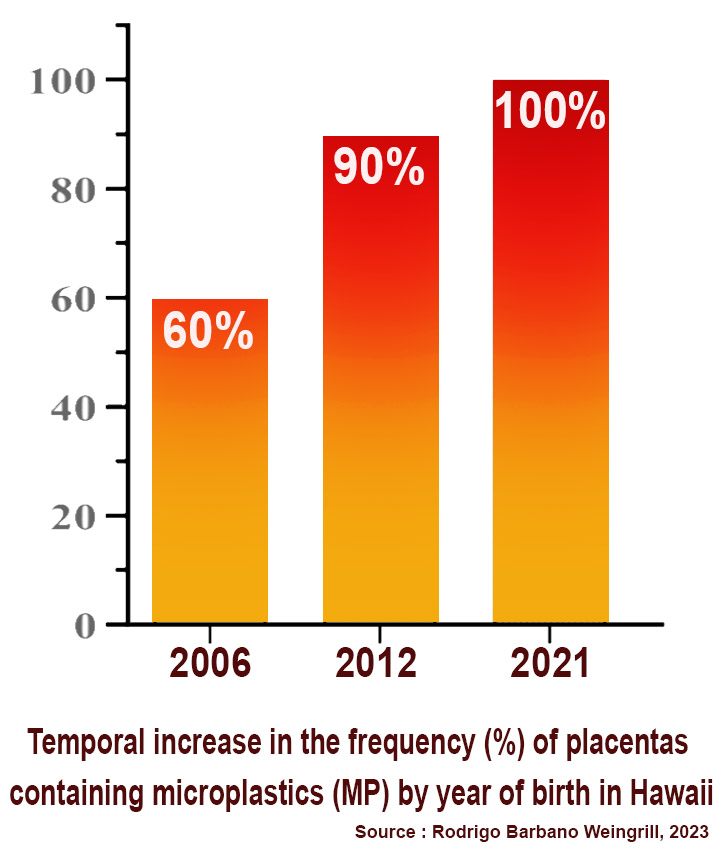
Increased presence of microplastics in human placentas

Microplastics (MPs) are typically defined as plastic fragments between 1 µm and 5 mm in diameter. Microplastics have become pervasive environmental contaminants, found in freshwater and marine systems, soil, indoor dust, and air. A major source of microplastic pollution is the breakdown of larger plastic debris, including the packaging of foods and beverages. Microplastics are also found in many personal care products, synthetic textiles, and industrial waste. A study of placentas from pregnancies in Hawaiʻi found substantial increases of microplastics. They were found in 60% of placentas in 2006, and in all placentas in 2021.

Microplastics cause harms through mechanisms such as oxidative stress, inflammation, cellular damage, endocrine disruption, impaired immune function, altered lipid and energy metabolism, and neurological damage. With respect to reproduction, microplastics have been shown to disrupt fertility, fetal development, and reproductive health.

== Effects ==
=== Overall fertility ===
An examination of county-level birth statistics from the 2010 China census reported both geographic variation and a decrease in fertility of 2% for each 10 μg/m^{3} increase in PM_{2.5} exposure. There are studies that support the fact that air pollution affects the production of reproductive cells, reducing the reproductive abilities of those cells.

=== Male fertility ===
Male fertility is declining worldwide. A meta-analysis of 223 studies of both "fertile men" and "unselected men" (healthy males whose fertility status was not previously known) shows declines in both sperm concentration (SC) and total sperm count (TSC) across all continents. Among unselected men, the mean sperm concentration declined by 51.6% between 1973 and 2018. The percent decline per year more than doubled when data was compared before and after 2000 (1.16% for 1972-1999; 2.64% for 2000-2018). Similar results were found for total sperm count, with a 62.3% overall decline among unselected men.

Known endocrine disruptors include both polycyclic aromatic hydrocarbons (PAHs) such as benzo(a)pyrene (BaP) and heavy metals such as lead (Pb), cadmium (Cd), copper (Cu), zinc (Zn) and mercury (Hg). BaP has been reported to reduce sperm motility and increase sperm abnormalities. This effect increases with exposure. Research has demonstrated that more BaPs were found in men with reported fertility issues compared to men without.

Heavy metals can accumulate in the body and have been found in semen samples. Exposures to heavy metals such as cadmium are linked to lower sperm density, motility, and sperm counts. Heavy metals are also linked to damage to the physical shape and structure of sperm (sperm morphology) and to sperm DNA fragmentation, making sperm less viable.

A review and meta-analysis of Chinese men examined exposures to criteria pollutants during the period of sperm development, 0–90 days before ejaculation. PM_{10}, PM_{2.5} and SO_{2} were related to decreased total sperm motility. PM_{2.5}, CO, and O_{3} exposure were related to decreases in total sperm number. Studies in Turkey, Poland, and California, among others, have linked exposure to particulate matter with decreases in sperm count and motility and increases in abnormal cell development. Particulate matter may have stronger effects during late stage development on decreasing sperm count and motility.

A study of criteria pollutants and male fertility in Hefei, China concluded that impacts on fertility were most strongly associated with sulfur dioxide. SO_{2} exposure negatively affected progressive motility and total motility during 0–90 lag days and 70–90 lag days. SO_{2} exposure also had negative effects on sperm concentration and total sperm number during 10–14 lag days.

Ozone is reported to cause a significant decrease in the concentration and count of sperm in semen after exposure. Similarly, sperm vitality, the proportion of live spermatozoa in a sample, was demonstrated to be diminished as a result of exposure to air pollution. Sperm may be more susceptible to structural damage from ozone during early to mid-development.

=== Female fertility ===
Elevated PM_{2.5} levels have been linked to alterations in serum markers of ovarian function such as anti-Mullerian hormone (AMH), follicle-stimulating hormone (FSH), and antral follicle count (AFC). Disrupted follicle development is implicated in ovarian disorders such as diminished ovarian reserve (DOR) and polyendocrine metabolic ovarian syndrome (PMOS).

Endocrine-disrupting chemicals also affect female fertility. A systematic review of studies of assisted reproductive technologies (ART) and fertility from 2000 and 2016 reported that EDC exposure was correlated with diminished ovarian reserve and peak estradiol (E_{2}) levels, lower oocyte and embryo quality, and lower rates of fertilization and implantation, among others.

Environmental pollutants like bisphenols (BPs) and polycyclic aromatic hydrocarbons (PAHs) cause increased inflammation and cell death within the ovary, reducing the number of ovarian germ cells, impairing follicular development, and depleting the ovarian reserve. SO_{2} exposure is also linked to decreases in antral follicle count (AFC) and diminished ovarian reserves. Ozone exposure has been associated with lowered anti-müllerian hormone (AMH) and diminished ovarian reserve in a study of women in Hubei, China.

A ten-year study of Taiwanese women of childbearing age revealed consistent trends between air pollutants and increasing risk of infertility. Infertility risk was higher with prolonged exposure to SO_{2}, CO, PM_{10}, PM_{2.5}, NO_{x}, NO, NO_{2}, total hydrocarbons, nonmethane hydrocarbons, and methane (CH4). Ozone, however, was associated with a lowered risk of infertility in this study.

=== In vitro fertilization ===
Studies suggest that high levels of ozone pollution, often a problem in the summer months, exert an effect on in vitro fertilisation (IVF) outcomes. Within an IVF population, NO_{x} and ozone were linked with reduced rates of live birth. An increase in NO_{2} is significantly associated with a lower live birth rate in women undergoing IVF treatment. Exposure to smaller particulate matter, PM_{2.5}, appears to have an effect on conception rates in women undergoing IVF but does not affect live birth rates.

While most research on this topic is focused on direct human exposure to air pollution, other studies have analyzed the impact of air pollution on gametes and embryos within IVF laboratories. Multiple studies have reported a marked improvement in embryo quality, implantation and pregnancy rates after IVF laboratories have implemented air filters in a concerted effort to reduce levels of indoor air pollution.

=== Fetal development and birth defects ===
Exposure to air pollution has been found to cause fetal damage and increase the risk of birth defects. Birth defects are related to the type of pollutant (SO_{2}, NO_{2}, PM_{10}, PM_{2.5}, O_{3}, and CO) and the period during gestation at which the exposure occurred, with critical periods occurring in the first and second trimesters. Potential harms include congenital heart defects, polydactyly, syndactyly, external ear malformations, and cleft lip and palate, among others.

Carbon monoxide (CO) can endanger both a pregnant women and a fetus's growth and mental development. CO competes with oxygen in the blood stream, and readily crosses the placenta to the fetus. A fetus is more susceptible to CO than an adult, and the effects of potentially-fatal carbon monoxide poisoning persist for much longer. The exact threshold for fetal harm due to fetal hypoxia (lack of oxygen) is uncertain. Pregnant women are advised to avoid smoking, second-hand smoke, and e-cigarettes to decrease the risk of affecting their child's growth or mental development.

High exposure to nitrogen oxides may cause fetal mutations and damage a developing fetus. In southern China, maternal exposure to air pollutants, especially particulate matter and NO_{2} in the first trimester, increased the risk of specific birth defects such as congenital heart defects (CHDs). In another study, maternal NO_{2} exposure was most strongly associated with CHDs in the first trimester, and PM_{2.5} exposure in the second and third trimester.

Phthalates, estrogens, and dioxins prenatally disrupt the development of male external genitalia, decrease Leydig and Sertoli cell function, INSL3, and steroidogenesis, and impair germ cell differentiation.

Components in air pollution, including polycyclic aromatic hydrocarbons (PAHs), can negatively affect fetal brain development, with impacts on cognition and behavior.

=== Pre-eclampsia ===
Exposure to PM2.5 may be linked to the development of pre-eclampsia, particularly during the third trimester of pregnancy. Pre-eclampsia increases both maternal and fetal morbidity and mortality.

=== Miscarriage ===
Miscarriage, also referred to as spontaneous abortion, is the natural loss of a pregnancy before the 20th week. Exposure to air pollutants such as particulate matter (PM) and carbon monoxide (CO) have been associated with a higher risk of miscarriage. There is an association between increased exposure to PM_{10} and early miscarriage. PM_{10} exposure across an entire pregnancy is associated with increased risk of miscarriage. CO exposure during the first trimester of pregnancy is associated with an increased risk of miscarriage. SO_{2} may also increase the risk of miscarriage.

In the general population, there is a significant increase in miscarriage rate in women exposed to NO_{2} compared to those not exposed. An epidemiological study conducted by the National Institute of Health compared pregnancy loss to local vehicle emissions, specifically nitrogen dioxide (NO_{2}) in Boston, Massachusetts, and Tel Aviv, Israel. In both locations, NO_{2} was associated with pregnancy loss, largely in the second trimester.

=== Stillbirth ===
Stillbirth is the natural loss of a pregnancy at or after the 20th week. Exposure to air pollutants such as particulate matter (PM), carbon monoxide (CO) and cooking smoke may be associated with higher risk for stillbirth. CO exposure is significantly associated with stillbirth in the second and third trimester. Exposure to PM_{2.5} and PM_{10} in the third trimester may increase the risk of stillbirth. Cooking smoke, which can contain both particulate matter and CO, has been found to increase the risk of stillbirths. This is a particularly serious concern in low- and middle-income countries, where dirtier fuels are often used for cooking and heating.

=== Preterm delivery and low-birth weight (LBW) ===
Both household air pollution and ambient air pollution are associated with pre-term delivery and low birth weight. This can lead to fatal outcomes, especially in developing countries. Reviews report that PM_{2.5} exposure is consistently associated with preterm birth and lower birth weight. An assessment of global burden for PM_{2.5} in 2019 calculated that each 10 μg/m^{3} increase in PM_{2.5} concentration was associated with a decrease of 22 g in birth weight, an 11% increase in the risk of low birth weight, and a 12% increase in the risk of preterm birth.

A study of pregnancy outcomes in greater London between 2006–2010 examined NO_{x}, NO_{2}, PM_{2.5} from traffic exhaust, PM_{2.5} from traffic non-exhaust, PM_{2.5}, PM_{10}, and O_{3}. After adjustment for the effects of other air pollutants, increased risk of low birth weight at term was most strongly associated with PM_{2.5}. PM_{2.5} levels above 13.8 μg/m^{3} were associated with a 3% increased risk of lower birth rate, after correction for other pollutants.

PM_{2.5}, CO, and nitrogen oxides are all associated with vehicular air pollution and with heating and cooking. NO_{x} is sometimes measured as a proxy indicator of general pollution levels. Areas with high levels of nitrogen dioxide in the air are associated with negative effects on fetuses. NO_{2} exposure correlates with reduced fetal growth, premature birth, and increased respiratory conditions. In Valencia, Spain, exposure to NO_{2} in all trimesters was found to be a risk factor for reduced fetal growth, as measured by birth weight and infant head circumference. The relationship with birth weight was strongest during the first trimester, while the relationship with reduced infant head circumference was strongest across the entire pregnancy. An increase in ambient NO_{2} levels of 10 μg/m^{3} during the second trimester was associated with fetuses that were 37% more likely to be small for gestational age in terms of weight. Poorer outcomes were also found when NO_{2} levels exceeded 40 μg/m^{3} during the first and second trimester.

In contrast, a study in Bergen and Oslo, Norway, concluded that differences in birth weight could be attributed to factors rather than NO_{2} exposure. However, the mean level of NO_{2} exposure across the whole pregnancy for the Bergen/Oslo study population was much lower than that of the Spanish study's population, 13.6 μg/m^{3} compared to 36.9 μg/m^{3}. It has been suggested that NO_{2} concentrations may have been at safe levels in terms of birth weight of newborns in Norway. Another study examined NO_{2}, NO, and PM_{10} in urban areas of Norway. It reported that prenatal exposure to NO during the third trimester was related to lower birth weight, while NO_{2} and PM_{10} were not.

In the United States, babies that were born prematurely were 94% more likely to have been exposed to high levels of pollution (as measured by NO_{2}) than those that were not premature. Living near high traffic areas and distance from roadways have been shown to be important in traffic-related pollution exposure. The closer one lives to a high-traffic area, the greater the likelihood of preterm birth and lower birth weight. One study compared pregnant women who lived upwind and downwind of the same high-traffic road in Texas. Living downwind was associated with decreased birth weight and higher risk of very preterm birth, compared to living upwind. The effects of living downwind of Los Angeles International Airport (LAX) have also been studied. Exposure to ultrafine particulate matter (less than 0.1μ⁢m in diameter) from airplanes has been found to increase the risk of preterm births.

In the United States, effects of living near coal-fired power plants were examined nationally by using county level data from 2000 to 2018. Increases in coal-related PM_{2.5} were associated with sharp increases in the risk of preterm birth. There were racial disparities in exposure to coal pollution and rates of preterm births.

A study of the relationship between carbon monoxide levels and adverse pregnancy outcomes has identified a threshold for effects of CO on birth weight. Above 2 parts per million (ppm), each increase of 1 ppm of CO was associated with a 69.35 g decrease in body weight. Above 2 ppm, the odds of adverse outcomes were significantly increased for being small for gestational age, preterm birth, and extended perinatal mortality.

=== Lifelong consequences ===
Children exposed to air pollution from the time of conception to two years of age can suffer life-threatening and lifelong consequences. Both short- and long-term exposure to air pollution including PM_{10}, PM_{2.5}, and NO_{2} have been noted as primary causes for infant mortality and for long-term health complications including cardiovascular, metabolic, respiratory, allergic, neurodevelopmental, and immune system effects.

Exposure to air pollution is associated with increased risk of premature birth, which can be accompanied by an array of health complications due to the shortened period of in utero organ development. Children born prematurely are at higher risk for chronic disorders involving the respiratory, cardiac, renal, and endocrine systems.

Air pollution is linked to immune thrombocytopenia (ITP), a common hematologic disorder in children and to central nervous system (CNS) problems such as hearing loss and vision loss. The effects of such gestational issues tend to persist into the adult years and can contribute to the development of obesity, high blood pressure, Type II Diabetes, and congenital heart defects.

==== Respiratory problems ====
The second trimester may be a critical period for healthy respiratory development. Exposure to low–moderate air pollution (PM_{10} and NO_{2}) during the second trimester has been related to impaired lung function in both full- and pre-term infants, with more negative effects in preterm infants. Moderate-to-late preterm births are more likely to experience Infant respiratory distress syndrome related to environmental factors. Prenatal exposures to PM_{2.5} are also related to increased risk of severe respiratory distress in full-term newborns. Air pollution is associated with increased risks of upper and lower respiratory tract infections and is argued to be a cause of chronic diseases such as asthma.

==== Asthma ====
Asthma has increased over past decades to become the most chronic illness in children and the most common cause of child hospitalizations and school absences. School absences negatively affect learning ability, and decrease opportunities for socialization with children of the same age. Children who suffer from asthma often repeat grades and are more likely to drop out before graduation compared to their non-affected peers.

A review and meta-analysis of studies examining pollutant exposure prenatally to age 18, concluded that exposure to PM_{2.5} and to a lesser degree PM_{10} were associated with increased risk of asthma and wheezing in children globally. However, trends in prevalence and severity of asthma symptoms vary by age group, country income, and region. Respiratory and allergic disorders among children in Japan decreased when regulations were put in place to reduce ambient air pollution from particulate matter and NO_{2}. From 2000-2019, global pediatric asthma cases linked to NO_{2} declined, from 20% to 16%. This primarily reflected improvements in air quality in Europe and parts of the U.S.A., while NO_{2} pollution and asthma cases rose in South Asia, Sub-Saharan African and the Middle East.

==== Cancer ====
Leukemia is the most common cancer among children. Children living close to high traffic areas and petrol stations are more likely to develop leukemia compared to children who live farther away. A 2026 review and meta-analysis confirms that exposure to traffic-related air pollution (TRAP) increases risk of childhood cancers. It also suggests that postnatal exposure to PM_{2.5} and NO_{2} may be associated with a higher leukemia risk than prenatal exposure.

==== Autism spectrum disorder ====
Autism spectrum disorder is a spectrum of disorders that range from severe inability to communicate and some mental disabilities to milder symptoms such as attention disorders. Children born prematurely have higher rates of autism spectrum disorder. Autism risk has been associated with exposure to pollutants including NO_{2}, O_{3}, CO, PM_{2.5}, and PM_{10}. Pre- and post-natal exposure to pollutants such as NO_{2} has been linked to lower diversity in the infant gut microbiome, which may be related to autism.

== Managing exposure ==
Pollutants can be inhaled, eaten, drunk, or absorbed through skin. Individuals can take steps to minimize their risks at home. Steps can be taken to minimize exposures such as avoiding smoking, reducing dust, using glass or metal instead of plastics, carefully selecting cleaning products and cosmetics, and exercising away from heavy traffic routes. Linda Giudice, former president of the International Federation of Fertility Societies, has published a list of steps for minimizing exposures to potentially harmful pollutants.

Information about local air quality can often be found through websites and apps. Direct exposure to air pollution can be minimized by checking local air quality and avoiding exposure when levels of pollutants, especially particulate matter (PM), are high. Steps may include avoiding outdoor activities, closing windows, and wearing a mask that can filter out PM_{2.5} (e.g. N95, KN95, or FFP2). It is best to exercise during periods of favorable air quality, exercise away from high traffic areas (> 300), and avoid idling vehicles. Extreme heat exposure can also affect reproductive health, so it is recommended to limit outdoor activities to cooler periods in the morning or evening, drink plenty of fluids, and avoid long periods of heat and sun exposure.

Smoke exposure is a major risk factor, including tobacco smoke, second hand smoke, wildfire smoke, and fumes from heating and cooking. Sources of smoke include using the fireplace, lighting candles, and burning incense. Do not smoke, and avoid places where people are smoking. Avoid burning of wood, especially damp wood, and trash. In smoky conditions, wear a mask. If possible, ventilate well during cooking. Let fresh air circulate indoors, as long as outdoor air quality is good.

Dust can contain multiple contaminants. Minimize dust in the home, by removing shoes before entering, and cleaning floors with a wet mop or cloth rather than a dry cloth or sweeping. It may help to use a home air purifier (HEPA filter).

Cleaning products can contain harmful substances. If possible, use alternative household cleaning products such as vinegar and water. Be careful, since some ingredients may be harmful when mixed, such as baking soda and vinegar. Avoid exposure to pesticides, insect sprays, and toxic flame retardants used in dry cleaning, clothing, foam products, and furniture.

Personal care products and fragrances can contain harmful substances. Avoid phthalates and use fragrance free rather than "unscented" products. Avoid hand sanitizers. Avoid lipsticks and ethnic products that may contain lead.

Exposure to microplastics can be minimized by avoiding products with plastic packaging, and using glass or stainless steel rather than plastic containers for storage. Discard plastic containers labeled #3, #6, or #7. Use BPA-free baby formula bottles and toys. Do not heat or microwave plastics. Cook with cast iron or stainless-steel pots and pans rather than non-stick pans.

Wash fresh fruits and vegetables before eating, and if possible eat organically-grown foods, to minimize exposures to pesticides. When choosing fish, pick varieties that are less likely to contain mercury. Trim fat from meat and skin from fish since fatty tissues are more likely to retain fat-soluble chemicals.

On a population level, policy changes can be taken to reduce outdoor air pollution. Cities such as London, Paris, Bogotá and Kraków have made changes that decrease pollution, in some cases reducing toxic air pollutants by 20-45% in a little over a decade. In 2026, Queen Mary University of London (QMUL) reported on the effects of a 2019 policy that fined high-pollution vehicles, creating an ultra-low emission zone (Ulez) in London. Levels of nitrogen dioxide decreased, and the lungs of children in the Ulez became bigger and stronger following the restriction of high-polluting vehicles. Control strategies also can be implemented that improve industrial safety and public health.

== See also ==
- Environmental impact of transport
- Environmental toxicants and fetal development
- List of most-polluted cities by particulate matter concentration
