= Yury Verlinsky =

Russian-American medical researcher (1943–2009)

- Born: September 1, 1943; Ishim, Siberia, Soviet Union, now Russia
- Died: July 16, 2009 (age 65); Chicago, Illinois, United States
- Education: Kharkiv University, Ukraine
- Known for: Prenatal diagnosis (chorionic villus); genetic diagnosis techniques;
- Scientific career
- Fields: Medical research, embryology and cytogenetics
- Workplaces: Reproductive Genetics Institute

Yury Verlinsky (1 September 1943 – 16 July 2009) was a Russian-American medical researcher specializing in embryonic and cellular genetics (genetic cytology). He is best known as a pioneer in prenatal diagnosis for detecting genetic and chromosomal disorders six weeks earlier than standard amniocentesis. The founding father of pre-implantation genetic diagnosis (PGD) and embryo analysis prior to in-vitro fertilization (IVF), Verlinsky used his polar body biopsy technique to detect potential birth defects in offspring. It is now accepted worldwide as the standard for the most efficient and effective means of analyzing the chromosomal status of an embryo.

With the help of his research, PGD can be used to prevent more than 200 different genetic disorders and diseases.

== Early years and education ==
Verlinsky was born in Ishim, Tyumen Oblast, Siberia, in the former Soviet Union, one of two sons of Simon Verlinsky and Dora Verlinskaya. His mother was an accountant and his father was a disabled veteran of the Soviet Army. Yury received his Ph.D. in embryology and cytogenetics from Kharkiv University, in the Ukrainian SSR, in 1973. While there, he met his wife Luba, a biologist. They married in 1967.

== Emigrating to the United States ==
After graduating with his Ph.D., he submitted research proposals which were all rejected by government committees. He chose to emigrate to the United States when the Soviet government continued to refuse his requests to fund further research into PGD, a field in which he was an early practitioner. This became difficult as he was forced to pay back the cost of his education before receiving his exit visa ("diploma tax"), which required that he borrow money from friends. He eventually left for the United States with his wife, their nine-year-old son, and just "two suitcases." He arrived in 1979, one of the many thousands of other Soviet Jews that were allowed to leave that same year, including a young Sergey Brin, who later co-founded Google, Inc.

== Genetics researcher ==
Soon after arriving, he was offered a research position with the Michael Reese Hospital in Chicago, Illinois, where he ran the cytogenetics laboratory. When asked how he so easily obtained the position, he replied "of my previous experience and because a chromosome in any language is a chromosome and a microscope is a microscope." He took time outside of his job to work at identifying chromosome polymorphisms in Down syndrome families and also to analyze chorionic villus sampling. His goal was to develop a modified technique for performing chromosomal analysis. His research was even more difficult since, like all Soviet emigres, he was not allowed to have contact with colleagues back home.

One such friend and colleague that he lost contact with was Anver Kuliev, with whom he had done research when he was still in Moscow. They had worked together developing a prenatal test that could be administered earlier than amniocentesis, with the goal of allowing a woman to avoid a second-trimester abortion. Years later, after Verlinsky had settled in the U.S., he was in London for a scientific meeting and discovered that Kuliev was working in the Soviet Union as head of genetics for the World Health Organization (WHO). Verlinsky contacted him, they met in Geneva in 1982, and soon after they began working together, again doing embryonic and genetic research. Kuriev would later become director of the Reproductive Genetics Institute that Verlinsky established in 1990.

Verlinsky was an expert in pre-implantation genetic diagnosis, which is the genetic testing and chromosome analysis of embryos before they are transferred to a woman's uterus with in-vitro fertilization (IVF.) His research expanded the applications of earlier prenatal and embryonic testing methods to allow doctors to understand the health and future of fetuses.

His diagnostic techniques have become widely accepted and are routinely used by prospective parents, especially couples with a history of genetic abnormalities or where the woman is over the age of 35, when the risk of genetically related disorders is higher. As the tests could be performed up to six weeks earlier than amniocentesis, which uses a technique called chorionic villus sampling, the prospective parents were often more comfortable considering an abortion if any major abnormalities or risk factors were discovered. In addition, by allowing parents to select an embryo without known genetic disorders, they also had the potential of saving the lives of siblings that already had similar disorders and diseases.

=== Establishing a clinic ===
In 1990, he established the private Reproductive Genetics Institute in Chicago to provide prenatal testing. According to his colleague, Dr. Norman Ginsberg, he was "a hard-working scientist, . . . . the first in the lab in the morning and the last out at night." Profits from his work were plowed back into research. "Rather than just make himself rich, he used this money to do a whole range of testing," Ginsberg added.

=== Utilizing "polar bodies" ===
Verlinsky developed his ideas for genetic screening before doing in-vitro fertilization, he says, "while viewing a 1935 Joan Miró painting in a Jerusalem art gallery." He observed that the painting showed "two disks, one red and one yellow, floating in space, with a small, round black object under the red one." The disks reminded him of human eggs, with one changing into the other by ejecting the black object. "In a flash of insight," he took out a business card and wrote "polar bodies" on the back of it.

A polar body is a cell structure found inside an ovum, which includes the package of chromosomes ejected by the egg before fertilization by sperm. Verlinsky's "insight" was that he could analyze the polar body to look for certain genetic defects in the resulting egg. This approach was useful when both parents were carriers of a genetic defect. He found that by using only eggs with the healthy version of the gene, "the child would be protected even if the father passed on the mutated version," and as a result, his approach produced many healthy pregnancies. He later found that a single cell could be removed from an early fertilized egg without disturbing subsequent development, and it can then be used for genetic diagnosis.

In 2000, his technique became notable when it helped the parents of Molly Nash, a child who suffered from life-threatening Fanconi anemia, conceive a son without the disease and whose cells were later used to save Molly's life. In 2002, his method also helped a mother, whose genetic diagnosis showed a likelihood of getting Alzheimer's disease, conceive a daughter who was free of the gene. The case was declared a "medical milestone" as the first use of genetic testing to prevent an early onset form of Alzheimer's disease.

=== Significance of research ===
As a result of Verlinsky's pre-implantation genetic diagnosis (PGD) methods, experts today are able to more easily test for over 200 different genetic disorders and diseases, including hemophilia, sickle cell anemia, Fanconi anemia, Alzheimer's disease, cystic fibrosis, thalassemia, Down syndrome, Tay–Sachs disease, muscular dystrophy, and Huntington's disease. Experts have credited him with "some of the firsts" in applying PGD, such as tissue typing to determine genetic defect risks and to allow the use of stem cells from newborns to treat other diseased family members. Dr. Andrew La Barbera, the scientific director for the American Society for Reproductive Medicine, said that Verlinsky's research had a "far-reaching impact on reproductive medicine" and he was a "giant in the field" by enabling couples to have children free of genetic diseases and making his methods "available to clinics around the world." "If it wasn't for Yury," said Dr. Jamie Grifo, program director at the New York University Fertility Center, "who knows how far this field would have come?"

== Death ==
Verlinsky died in Chicago of colon cancer on July 16, 2009, at the age of 65. He is survived by his wife, Luba, a son, Oleg, his brother, Vitaly, and three grandchildren.

== Other sources ==
- Verlinsky, Yury, and Kuliev, Anver. Textbook of Assisted Reproductive Techniques, "Clinical Application of Polar Body Biopsy", Chapter 31, Informa Healthcare (2004)
- Verlinsky, Yury, and Kuliev, Anver. Textbook of In-vitro Fertilization and Assisted Reproduction, "Preimplantation Genetic Diagnosis and its Rold in Assisted Reproduction Technology", Bourn Hall Clinic, 2005
- Kuliev A, and Verlinsky Y. "Preimplantation genetic diagnosis: technological advances to improve accuracy and range of applications", Reproductive Genetics Institute, 2825 North Halsted Street, Chicago, IL., April 16, 2008

´
