= Linda Giudice =

American gynecologist and obstetrician

Linda C. Giudice is an American gynecologist and obstetrician whose research has focused on the genetics of infertility, endometriosis, and the mechanisms of the menstrual cycle, along with the impacts of environmental pollutants on women's fertility. A New Yorker, she had an accelerated education with a heavy emphasis on the sciences, moving through multiple disciplines of engineering for her undergraduate and graduate degrees. Her postdoctoral fellowships introduced her to translational medicine and the genetics of women's health, resulting in her returning to her studies to obtain a medical degree.

Afterwards, she has spent her professorship for multiple decades at Stanford University and then the University of California, San Francisco, becoming tenured chair of several obstetrics and gynecology departments. A member of many professional academic organizations, she has also been and remains president or board member for a collection of reproductive health groups and non-profits. She has been given a number of awards and honorary professorships for her work and public outreach, nationally and internationally.

== Early life and education ==
=== Chemistry and engineering ===
Born in Brooklyn, New York to an immigrant family, with a Sicilian father and a second generation mother whose parents were from Italy, Giudice was taught strong values about education from a young age. This focus resulted in her repeatedly skipping grades in both elementary and high school and openly pursuing her interests in math and science, along with many other fields as well. In the middle of her attending high school, her family moved to Norfolk, Virginia, due to her father being transferred in the military and she completed her education there.

Her interests in chemistry and physics led her to pursue a degree in engineering, with an aim of eventually going into nuclear engineering. After starting classes at Columbia University, however, she found that chemistry was of greater interest to her and changed her major to obtain a Bachelor's of Science in chemical engineering. Continuing with this at Washington University in St. Louis, she received a Master's degree in biomedical engineering and then studied under John Pierce at the University of California, Los Angeles to earn a Ph.D. focusing on the biological function and molecular structure of gonadotropins. This also resulted in her learning more about reproductive hormones and the biological underpinnings of how genetics shapes reproduction.

=== Expanding her medical interests ===
Once Giudice was done with her degrees, she began a postdoctoral fellowship at Rockefeller University in the lab of later Nobel Prize winner Günter Blobel. Her work centered around cell biology and specifically the biochemistry of RNA and protein processing, including how proteins undergo translational modification. She continued her work with a second fellowship at the Eunice Kennedy Shriver National Institute of Child Health and Human Development, where she worked in the Clinical Endocrinology Branch of the NIH. Her research there had her refocus on what her Ph.D. had been on, involving thyroid-stimulating hormone biochemistry and the chemical components that form it in the body. Working alongside well known international endocrinologists had her better understand the importance of translational medicine, which made her want to go to medical school herself to learn more. She then was accepted to Stanford University's medical program.

Beginning her internal medicine internship at Stanford, she was mentored under then Chair of obstetrics and gynecology at the university, Kent Ueland, and had a rotation in labor and delivery and another in the outpatient gynecology clinic. Her work alongside other obstetricians, including Jagdip Powar and Emmet Lamb, increased her interest in conducting reproductive medicine. The final years of her residency had her return to Washington University to mentor under James Warren before finally finishing her training at Stanford as a Reproductive Endocrinology and Infertility Fellow.

== Career ==
After her medical training was complete, she was accepted at Stanford as an assistant professor and ran her own research lab on infertility and reproductive and growth hormones. She spent two decades at Stanford before transferring to the University of California, San Francisco (UCSF) in 2005 to become the Chair of the Department of Obstetrics and Gynecology and Reproductive Sciences. She worked to improve and expand the research done by the department, achieving the top spot at the university for amount of NIH research funding. Recruiting multiple new professors during her tenure, she also worked with Kaiser Permanente to fund the University of California, Berkeley's Undergraduate Research Intern Program. This led to the creation of a summer program at UCSF for interns.

Giudice was furthermore in charge of the 2015 move of the UCSF department from its location at Parnassus Heights to the new Mission Bay campus. During this time period, she was also made Chair Emerita of the department and the Robert B. Jaffe, MD, Endowed Professor in the Reproductive Sciences for UCSF. She is also emeritus faculty at Stanford, now as Stanley McCormick Memorial Professor.

She has advocated for the use of IVF to treat infertility issues and overall suggested that using the process to delay motherhood is an option for women. Relatedly, she was appointed in 2002 as chair of the Food and Drug Administration's Advisory Committee for Reproductive Health Drugs.

== Research ==
Due to attending the pediatric endocrinology lab meetings, Giudice developed a passion for insulin-like growth factors (IGFs) and particularly insulin-like growth factor-binding protein (IGFBP), because of its involvement in the uterine decidua. Her lab's work on the serum of pregnant women found that IGF-I and II are increased due to the action of a protease in cleaving IGFBP-3. This discovery required the usage of a cloned protein created by Genentech, which was also found simultaneously by a French lab. Presenting what they found jointly at the annual Endocrine Society meeting, they decided to write papers separately on different components of what had been found and publish them back-to-back in The Journal of Clinical Endocrinology and Metabolism. This finding, alongside her lab's later reveal that IGFBP-4's protease comes from the trophoblast, helped further explain how IGFs function as a whole and their importance beyond just reproduction, but also in the field of oncology's research on cancer development.

Then, during the early 1990s, the research company Affymetrix was created to produce DNA microarrays for scientists. Giudice took advantage of this new tool and applied it to identify what genes are up and down regulated during the menstrual cycle. Her lab found that immune system genes had the highest variation, with the cytokine CXCL14 being activated the most to recruit cells during the implantation phase. They also discovered insights into infertility, whereby the cytokine leukemia inhibitory factor (LIF) upregulation influenced implantation and women with lower levels of the factor had issues with fertility and miscarriages. These and many others were identified from the microarrays and were used by Giudice to create an entire endometrium transcriptome to allow for more factors to be isolated and to potentially find ways to prevent endometriosis. This also led them, alongside Karen Smith-McCune, to determine that certain oral contraceptives and intrauterine devices using levonorgestrel caused proinflammatory markers with possible health effects to emerge.

Continuing investigations into the endometrium, Giudice's lab turned to epigenetics due to how the hormonal changes in the menstrual cycle had been previously known to also change the epigenetic markers in related cells. They did a full description of the methylome for endometrial cells and found correlations with expression changes in the already made transcriptome, allowing for greater understanding and treatment of reproductive problems with targeted hormone therapy. Her research into the effects of progesterone on endometrial fibroblasts and their impact on the onset of pregnancy helped develop a clinical understanding of how progesterone resistance occurs.

When asked by a patient if her infertility issues might be related to local water pollution with endocrine disruptors, Giudice decided to conduct an investigation into the possibility. While the scientific literature had some evidence based on animal studies, no human level research had been conducted at the time. The research she conducted found that bisphenol A has a measurable correlation with the concentration of the disruptors in pregnant women's urine and the likelihood of miscarriage. Organizing a conference on the subject with other reproductive endocrinologists, fertility organizations, and national politicians, she presented her preliminary findings and had a discussion on possible impacts. This also led her to create the Program for Reproductive Health and the Environment (PRHE) at UCSF and a second following conference, whose findings eventually led to the publication of the textbook Environmental impacts on reproductive health and fertility. She also presented her findings in 2015 at the International Federation of Gynaecology and Obstetrics (FIGO) conference, successfully convincing the delegates attending to release an official FIGO statement calling for global action on the issue.

In total, she has published over 350 papers in her field of research.

== Organizations ==
Having held membership and leadership positions in multiple professional societies, Giudice also has been on the council for the nonprofit March of Dimes and on the UCSF's steering committee for Women's Precision Medicine. She is an official member of the US National Academy of Medicine and the US National Academy of Inventors. Previously, she held the president position for the Society for Gynecologic Investigation, the Society for Reproductive Endocrinology and Infertility, the American Society for Reproductive Medicine, and the World Endometriosis Society.

Giudice is the president of the International Federation of Fertility Societies and holds a chair position in the International Federation of Gynaecology and Obstetrics's Committee on Reproductive and Developmental Environmental Health. She is also a fellow of the American Association for the Advancement of Science.

== Awards ==
Giudice has received numerous awards and accolades for her work throughout her life. The Society of Reproductive Investigation gave her the Fredrick Naftolin Award for Mentorship for the over 250 graduate and undergraduate students she has mentored during her tenure as professor. The American Society for Reproductive Medicine bestowed on her the Distinguished Researcher Award and the American Medical Women's Association named her the 2008 Women in Science Award winner. For her research into environmental effects on infertility, the American Infertility Association gave her their Illumination Award. The 2013 Lifetime Alumni Achievement Award was given to her by the Stanford Medical Center.

Two honorary professorships were gifted to her by the University of Florence and Aarhus University, along with her being named an honorary fellow of the Royal College of Obstetricians and Gynecologists. She was also given multiple official lecturer positions, such as by the NIH, the NICHD Sadler lecturer position, and the Royal Reproductive Biology Society's Founders Oration position and medal.

== Personal life ==
Giudice is married to plant biologist Dr Athanasios "Sakis" Theologis after meeting him during graduate school. They have two children.

== Bibliography ==
- —; Aplin, John D.; Tabibzadeh, Siamak; Glasser, Stanley R., eds. (2002). The Endometrium. CRC Press. p. 696. ISBN 9780203219034.
- —; Santa, Eileen; Pool, Robert, eds. (2007). Assessing the Medical Risks of Human Oocyte Donation for Stem Cell Research: Workshop Report. National Academies Press. p. 112. ISBN 9780309179607.
- —; Guillette, Louis J.; Janssen, Sarah J.; Woodruff, Tracey J., eds. (2010). Environmental Impacts on Reproductive Health and Fertility. Cambridge University Press. p. 250. ISBN 9781139484848.
- —; Healy, David L.; Evers, Johannes L. H., eds. (2012). Endometriosis: Science and Practice. Wiley. p. 600. ISBN 9781444332131.
- —; DiSaia, Philip J.; Chaudhuri, Gautam; Moore, Thomas R.; Smith, Lloyd H.; Porto, Manuel M. (2012). Women's Health Review: A Clinical Update in Obstetrics - Gynecology. Elsevier Health Sciences. p. 496. ISBN 9781455740512.
- —; Simon, Carlos, eds. (2017). The Endometrial Factor: A Reproductive Precision Medicine Approach. CRC Press. p. 284. ISBN 9781351647519.
