= Journal of Human Reproductive Sciences =

- Discipline: Human reproduction
- Language: English

Publication details
- History: 2008-present
- Publisher: Medknow Publications (India)
- Frequency: Triannually

Standard abbreviations
- ISO 4: J. Hum. Reprod. Sci.

Indexing
- ISSN: 0974-1208 (print); 1998-4766 (web)

Links
- Journal homepage

The Journal of Human Reproductive Sciences is a peer-reviewed open-access medical journal published on behalf of the Indian Society of Assisted Reproduction. The journal publishes articles on the subject of assisted conception, endocrinology, physiology and pathology, implantation, and preimplantation genetic diagnosis.

== Abstracting and indexing ==
The journal is indexed with Abstracts on Hygiene and Communicable Diseases, CAB Abstracts, EBSCO databases, Excerpta Medica/EMBASE, and PubMedCentral.

== See also ==
- Human Reproduction (journal)
