= Human reproduction =

Procreative biological processes of humanity

Human sexual reproduction, to produce offspring, typically begins with sexual intercourse between a healthy, sexually mature and fertile male and female. During sexual intercourse, sperm cells are ejaculated from the penis into the vagina, resulting in fertilization of an ovum to form a zygote.

While normal cells contain 46 chromosomes (23 pairs), gamete cells contain only half that number, and it is when these two cells merge into one combined zygote cell that genetic recombination occurs. The zygote then undergoes a defined development process that is known as human embryogenesis, and this starts the typical 38-week gestation period (Note: This is measuring from ovulation.) for the embryo (and eventually fetus) that is followed by childbirth.

Assisted reproductive technology also exists, like IVF, some of which involve alternative methods of fertilization, which do not involve sexual intercourse; the fertilization of the ovum may be achieved by artificial insemination methods.

== Biological and legal requirements ==
In order for human reproduction to be achieved, an individual must undergo puberty first, requiring ovulation in females and the spermarche in males to have occurred prior to engaging in sexual intercourse or achieving pregnancy through non-penetrative means. Before puberty, the human genitalia lacks reproductive function.

Legal factors also play a vital role in the achievement of human reproduction: a minor under the age of consent cannot give legal consent to sexual intercourse or artificial alternatives to reproduction, the former case of which is liable to have the older party charged with statutory rape or child sexual abuse, depending on jurisdictions. Even for minors above the age of consent, comprehensive sex education advises one or both parties to use contraception to avoid both sexually transmitted infections and early, unplanned/unwanted pregnancy. In developed countries, adolescent pregnancies are especially discouraged due to a high risk of death from complications related to lacking the physical necessities for parenthood.

== Anatomy ==
=== Male reproductive system ===
The male reproductive system contains two main divisions: the testicles where sperm are produced, and the penis where semen is ejaculated through the urethra. In humans, both of these organs are outside the abdominal cavity. Having the testicles outside the abdomen facilitates temperature regulation of the sperm, which require specific temperatures to survive about 2-3 °C less than the normal body temperature i.e. 37 °C. In particular, the extraperitoneal location of the testicles may result in a 2-fold reduction in the heat-induced contribution to the spontaneous mutation rate in male germinal tissues compared to tissues at 37 °C. If the testicles remain too close to the body, it is likely that the increase in temperature will harm the spermatozoa formation, making conception more difficult. This is why the testes are carried in an external scrotum rather than within the abdomen; they normally remain slightly cooler than body temperature, facilitating sperm production.

Male germ cells produced in the testes are able to perform special DNA repair processes during meiosis that act to repair DNA damages and to maintain the integrity of the genomes that are to be passed on to progeny. Two of these DNA repair processes are homologous recombinational repair and non-homologous end joining.

=== Female reproductive system ===
The female reproductive system likewise contains two main divisions: the external genitalia (the vulva) and the internal genitalia.

The ovum meets with the sperm cell: a sperm may penetrate and merge with the egg, fertilizing it with the help of certain hydrolytic enzymes present in the acrosome. The fertilization usually occurs in the fallopian tubes, but can happen in the uterus itself. The zygote then becomes implanted in the lining of the uterus, where it begins the processes of embryogenesis and morphogenesis. When the fetus is developed enough to survive outside of the uterus, the cervix dilates and contractions of the uterus propel it through the birth canal, which is the vagina, and thereby gives external life to the newborn infant. This process is called childbirth.

The ova, which are the female sex cells, are much larger than the spermatozoon and are normally formed within the ovaries of the female fetus before birth. They are mostly fixed in location within the ovary until their transit to the uterus, and contain nutrients for the later zygote and embryo. Over a regular interval known as the menstrual cycle, in response to hormonal signals, a process of oogenesis matures one ovum which is released and sent down the fallopian tube. If not fertilized, this egg is flushed out of the system through menstruation.

Oocytes (female germ cells) located in the primordial follicle of the ovary are in a non-growing prophase arrested state, but are able to undergo highly efficient homologous recombinational repair of DNA damages including double-strand breaks. This capability allows the maintenance of genome integrity and protection of the health of offspring.

== Process of fertilization ==
Basic processes involved: 1. maturity; 2. spermatogenesis and oogenesis; 3. vaginal intercourse with internal fertilization; 4. zygote; 5. embryonic development; 6. childbirth; 7. childhood to adolescence.

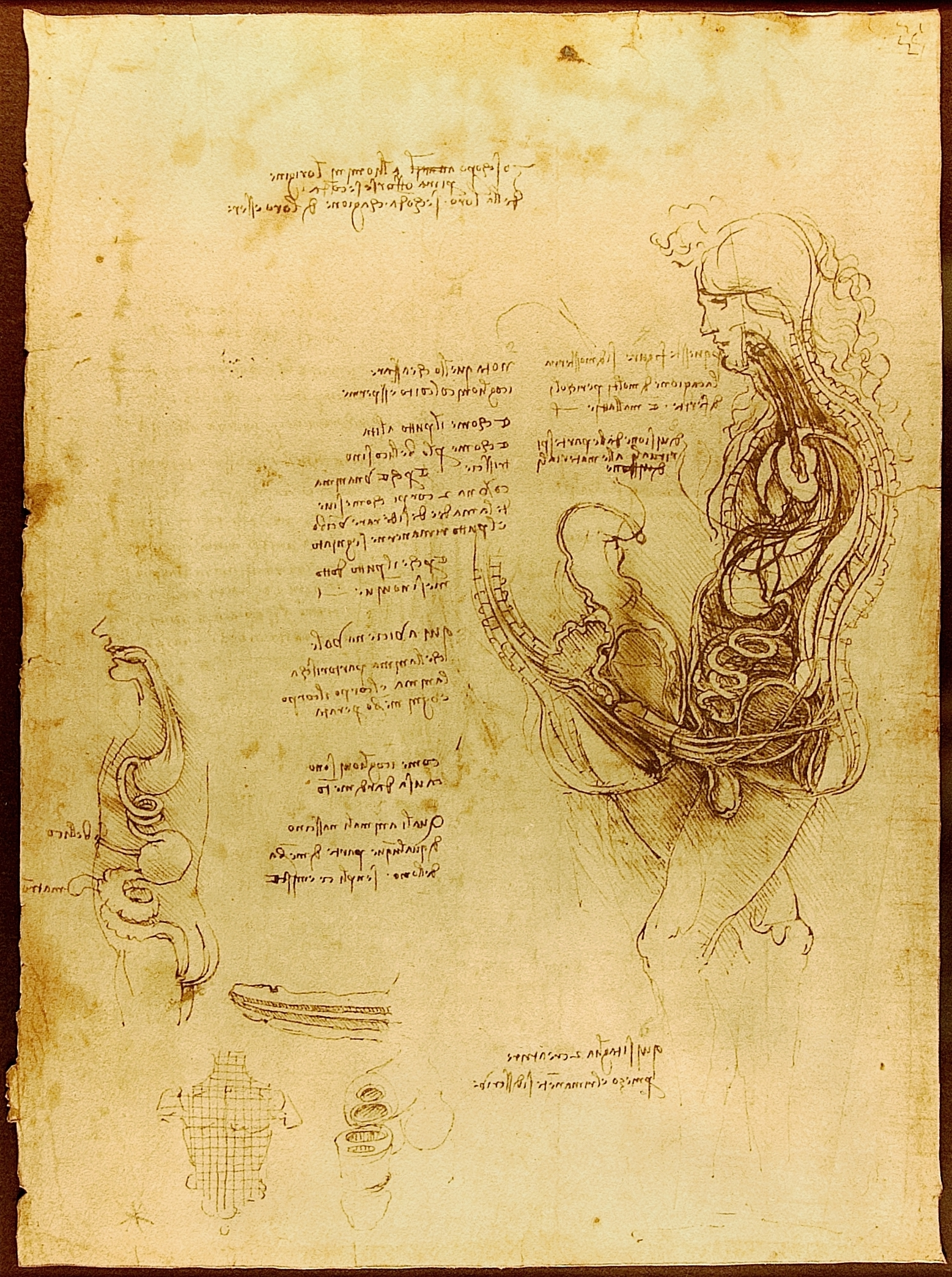
"Coition of a Hemisected Man and Woman" (c. 1492) by Leonardo da Vinci

Human reproduction normally begins with copulation, though it may be achieved through artificial insemination, and is followed by nine months of pregnancy before childbirth. Pregnancy can be avoided with the use of contraceptives such as condoms and intrauterine devices.

=== Copulation ===
Human reproduction naturally takes place as internal fertilization by sexual intercourse. During this process, the man inserts his erect penis into the woman's vagina and then either partner initiates rhythmic pelvic thrusts until the man achieves orgasm, which leads to ejaculation of semen containing sperm into the vaginal canal. The sperm and the ovum are known as the gametes (each containing half the genetic information of the parent, created through meiosis). The sperm (being one of approximately 250 million sperm in a typical ejaculation) travels through the vagina and cervix into the uterus or fallopian tubes. Only 1 in 14 million of the ejaculated sperm will reach the fallopian tube. The egg simultaneously moves through the fallopian tube away from the ovary. One of the sperm encounters, penetrates and fertilizes the ovum, creating a zygote. Upon fertilization and implantation, gestation of the fetus then occurs within the uterus.

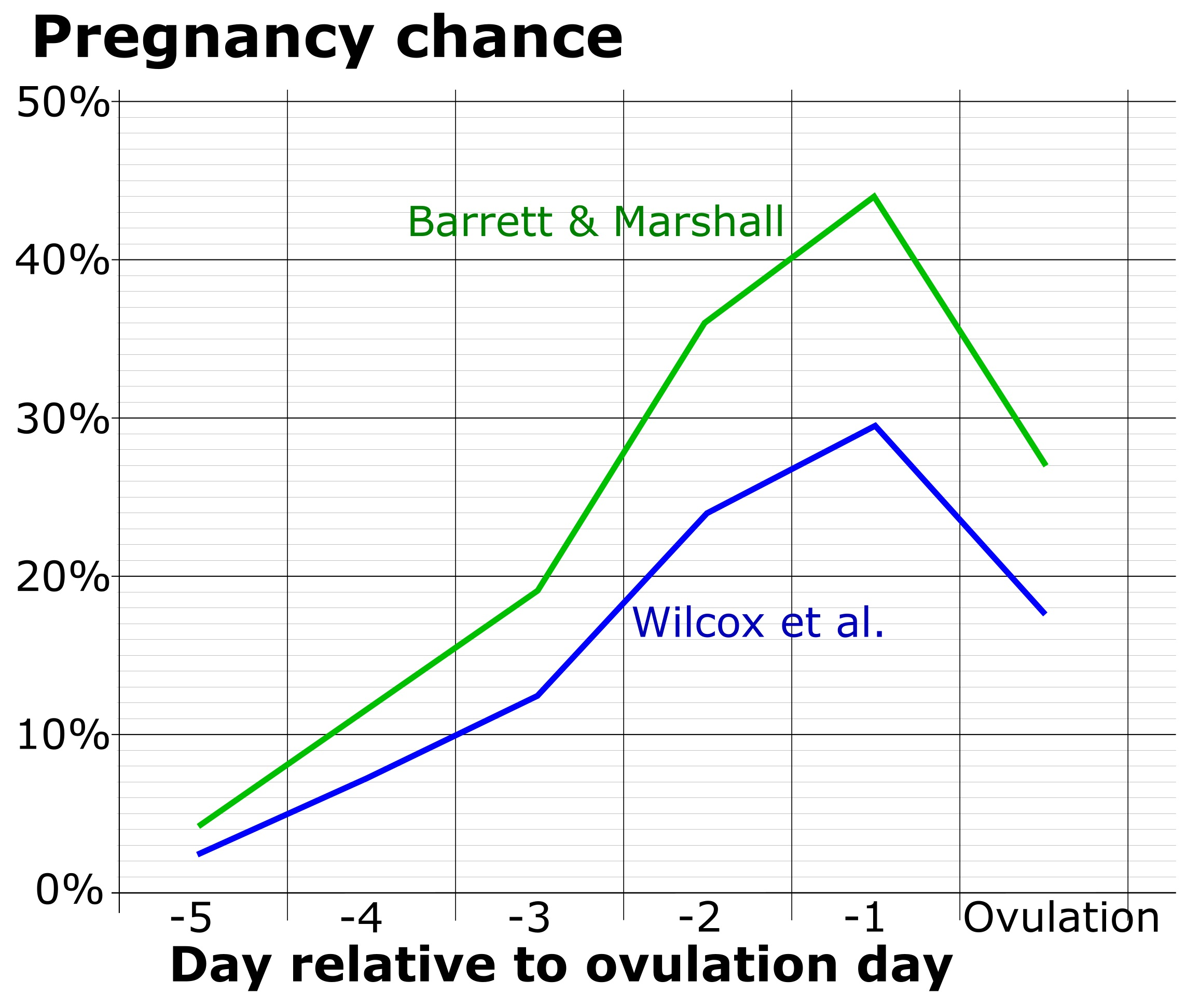
Chance of fertilization by menstrual cycle day relative to ovulation

Pregnancy rates for sexual intercourse are highest during the menstrual cycle time from some 5 days before until 1 to 2 days after ovulation. For optimal pregnancy chance, there are recommendations of sexual intercourse every 1 or 2 days, or every 2 or 3 days. Studies have shown no significant difference between different sex positions and pregnancy rate, as long as it results in ejaculation into the vagina.

=== Alternative methods ===
As an alternative to natural sexual intercourse, there exists artificial insemination, where sperm is introduced into the female reproductive system without the insertion of the penis. There are also many methods of assisted reproductive technology, such as in vitro fertilization, where one or more egg cells are retrieved from a woman's ovaries and co-incubated with sperm outside the body. The resulting embryo can then be reinserted into the womb of the woman.

=== Pregnancy ===
Pregnancy is the period of time during which the fetus develops, dividing via mitosis inside the uterus. During this time, the fetus receives all of its nutrition and oxygenated blood from the mother, filtered through the placenta, which is attached to the fetus' abdomen via an umbilical cord. This drain of nutrients can be quite taxing on the mother, who is required to ingest slightly higher levels of calories. In addition, certain vitamins and other nutrients are required in greater quantities than normal, often creating abnormal eating habits. Gestation period is about 266 days in humans. While in the uterus, the baby first endures a very brief zygote stage, then the embryonic stage, which is marked by the development of major organs and lasts for approximately eight weeks, then the fetal stage, which revolves around the development of bone cells while the fetus continues to grow in size. It is estimated that about 3-5% of couples are infertile and the fecunditity of couples is around 30% for each menstrual cycle.

=== Labor and birth ===
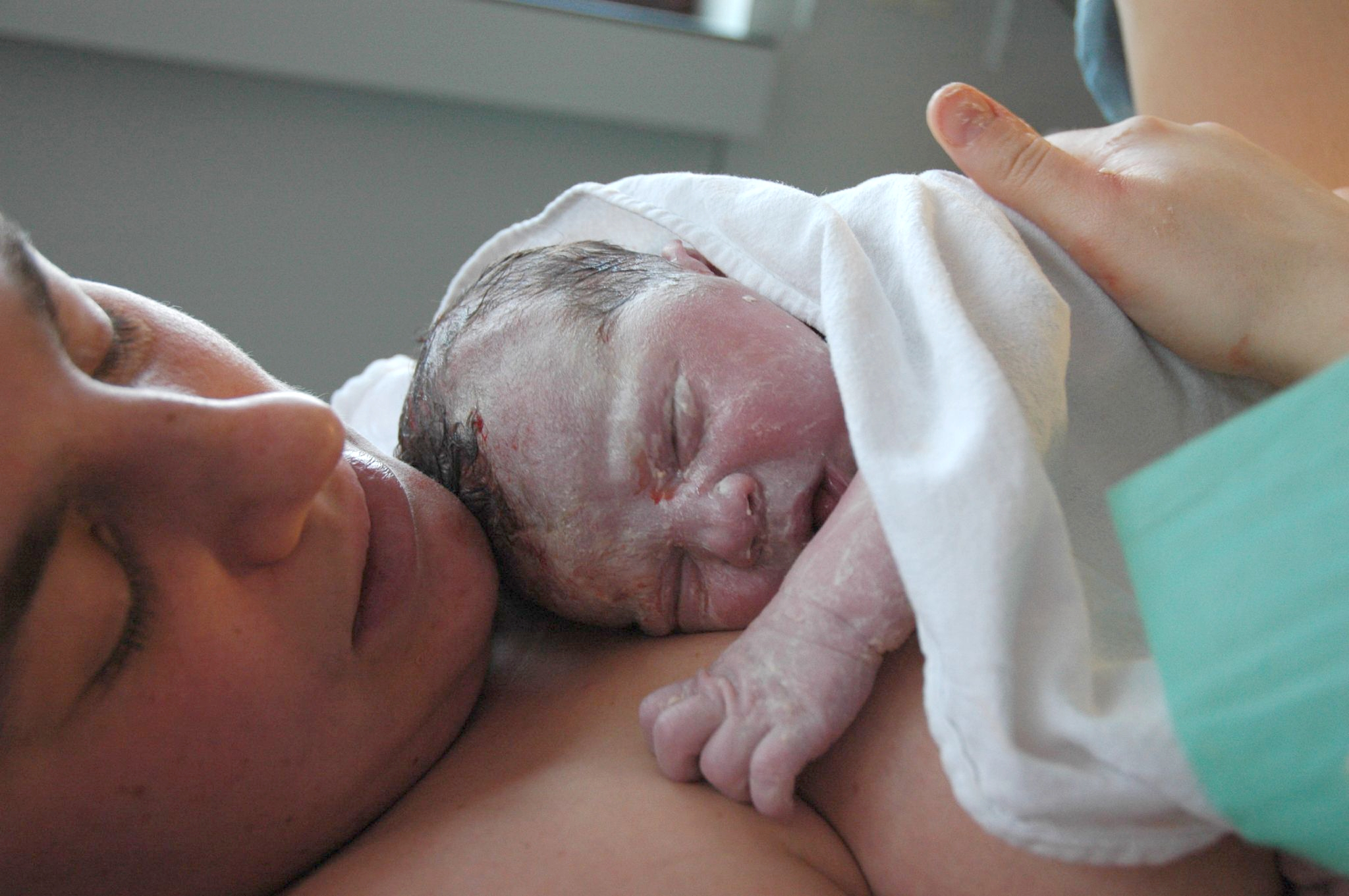
Newborn infant and mother

Labor is separated into 4 stages. The first stage involves latent phase and active phase separated by the dilation of the cervix for 6 to 10 cm. The second stage is the pushing stage. The third stage involves the delivery of the placenta. And the last stage is the contraction of the uterus. Once the fetus is sufficiently developed, chemical signals begin the process of birth, which begins with the fetus being pushed out of the birthing canal. The newborn, which is called an infant in humans, should typically begin respiration on its own shortly after birth. Not long after, the placenta eventually falls off on its own. The person assisting the birth may also sever the umbilical cord.

== Discovery of mechanism ==
While most ancient human societies believed that sexual intercourse was necessary for reproduction, the reasons some sex did not result in children, and the mechanism by which mating produced children were not understood. The theory of preformationism was popular in Ancient Greece and Christendom for centuries. Because they are too small to see with the naked eye, it was only after his invention of the microscope that Antonie van Leeuwenhoek discovered spermatozoa in 1677. Mitosis and meiosis were not discovered until the late 1800s.

== See also ==
- Heterosexuality
- Antinatalism
- Evolution of sexual reproduction
- Female infertility
- Human Reproduction (journal)
- Journal of Human Reproductive Sciences
- Male infertility
- Natalism
- Paternal age effect
- Reproduction
- Reproductive system
- Legislation on human reproduction
- Reproductive health
