= Polar body biopsy =

Sampling of a polar body of an oocyte

Polar body biopsy is the sampling of a polar body of an oocyte. It was first applied clinically in humans in 1987 after extensive animal studies. A polar body is a small haploid cell that is formed concomitantly as an egg cell during oogenesis, but which generally does not have the ability to be fertilized.

After sampling of a polar body, subsequent analysis can be used to predict viability and pregnancy chance of the oocyte, as well as the future health of a person resulting from such a pregnancy. The latter use makes it a form of preimplantation genetic screening (PGS). Compared to a blastocyst biopsy, a polar body biopsy can potentially be of lower costs, less harmful side-effects, and more sensitive in detecting abnormalities.

== Techniques ==
The first polar body is removed from the unfertilised oocyte, and the second PB from the zygote, shortly after fertilization. The biopsy and analysis of the first and second polar bodies can be completed before fertilization, which is the moment from which the zygote may become protected by law as an embryo.

By screening the first polar body for chromosomal anomalies, non-viable eggs can be reliably identified, though eggs with normal first polar bodies can still be affected by errors. This method was initially performed with fluorescence in situ hybridization (FISH), then by hybridizing a sample into lymphocytes to observe it in metaphase, and more recently by microarrays, which are fully automated and make it easier to distinguish between chromosome vs. chromatid abnormalities.

The main advantage of the use of polar bodies in PGD is that they are not necessary for successful fertilisation or normal embryonic development, thus ensuring no deleterious effect for the embryo. One of the disadvantages of PB biopsy is that it only provides information about the maternal contribution to the embryo, which is why cases of autosomal dominant and X-linked disorders that are maternally transmitted can be diagnosed, and autosomal recessive disorders can only partially be diagnosed. Another drawback is the increased risk of diagnostic error, for instance due to the degradation of the genetic material or events of recombination that lead to heterozygous first polar bodies. It is generally agreed that it is best to analyse both polar bodies in order to minimize the risk of misdiagnosis. This can be achieved by sequential biopsy, necessary if monogenic diseases are diagnosed, to be able to differentiate the first from the second polar body, or simultaneous biopsy if FISH is to be performed.

In theory, molecular analysis of polar bodies may include epigenetic profiling in the near future.

== Target diseases ==
=== Aneuploidy ===
Several studies have suggested that polar body screening for aneuploidy may not be optimal. When the majority of errors occur in chromatids rather than entire chromosomes (a condition correlated with the age of the mother), screening only the first polar body will fail to detect a large percentage of defective eggs. As mentioned earlier, chromosomal abnormality in the first polar body can result in a healthy embryo, meaning that eggs may in fact be wasted as a result of the screening. Polar body testing will also be unable to detect post-zygotic errors in an oocyte.

Because euploid polar bodies contain the same chromosomes as the oocyte, they can be used as a source of genetic material that is easily accessed without destroying the egg. This presents a research advantage by minimizing damage to the oocytes under investigation.

== Usage ==
Polar body biopsy is used mainly by two PGD groups in the USA and by groups in countries where cleavage-stage embryo selection is banned.
