= Human Reproduction (journal) =

- Discipline: Human reproduction, reproductive biology
- Language: English
- Edited by: Cornelis Lambalk

Publication details
- History: 1986-present
- Publisher: Oxford University Press
- Frequency: Monthly
- Impact factor: 5.733 (2019)

Standard abbreviations
- ISO 4: Hum. Reprod.

Indexing
- CODEN: HUREEE
- ISSN: 0268-1161 (print); 1460-2350 (web)
- OCLC no.: 13829792

Links
- Journal homepage; Online access; Online archive

Human Reproduction Update
- Discipline: Human reproduction, reproductive biology
- Language: English
- Edited by: Arne Sunde

Publication details
- Former name(s): Bibliography of Reproduction, Oxford Reviews of Reproductive Biology
- History: 1995-present
- Publisher: Oxford University Press
- Frequency: Bimonthly
- Impact factor: 12.684 (2019)

Standard abbreviations
- ISO 4: Hum. Reprod. Update

Indexing
- CODEN: HRUPF8
- ISSN: 1355-4786 (print); 1460-2369 (web)
- LCCN: 95657574
- OCLC no.: 32055602

Links
- Journal homepage; Online access; Online archive

Molecular Human Reproduction
- Discipline: Human reproduction, reproductive biology
- Language: English
- Edited by: Michele Boiani

Publication details
- History: 1995-present
- Publisher: Oxford University Press
- Frequency: Monthly
- Impact factor: 3.636 (2019)

Standard abbreviations
- ISO 4: Mol. Hum. Reprod.

Indexing
- CODEN: MHREFD
- ISSN: 1360-9947 (print); 1460-2407 (web)
- OCLC no.: 33838450

Links
- Journal homepage; Online access; Online archive

Human Reproduction is a peer-reviewed scientific journal covering all aspects of human reproduction, including reproductive physiology and pathology, endocrinology, andrology, gonad function, gametogenesis, fertilization, embryo development, implantation, pregnancy, genetics, preimplantation genetic diagnosis, oncology, infectious disease, surgery, contraception, infertility treatment, psychology, ethics, and social issues. It is an official journal of the European Society of Human Reproduction and Embryology. It was established in 1986 with Robert Edwards as founding editor-in-chief.

== Spin-off journals ==
The journals Human Reproduction Update and Molecular Human Reproduction are spin-offs from Human Reproduction that were established in 1995. The main journal concentrates on original research, clinical case studies, as well as opinions and debates on topical issues. Human Reproduction Update is a bimonthly review journal. According to the Journal Citation Reports its 2019 impact factor is 12.684, ranking it first in the categories "Obstetrics and Gynaecology" (out of 79) and "Reproductive Biology" (out of 30).

Molecular Human Reproduction focuses on molecular aspects of reproductive biology and is published monthly. According to the Journal Citation Reports its 2019 impact factor is 3.636, ranking it 10th out of 41 in the category "Developmental Biology" and 6th out of 29 in the category "Reproductive Biology".

== Abstracting and indexing ==
All three journals are abstracted and indexed in Biological Abstracts, BIOSIS Previews, Current Contents, EMBASE/Excerpta Medica, PubMed/MEDLINE, ProQuest, and the Science Citation Index.

== See also ==
- Journal of Human Reproductive Sciences
