= Reproductive endocrinology =

Reproductive endocrinology may refer to:

- Reproductive endocrinology and infertility, about the subspecialty of obstetrics and gynecology for physicians
- Endocrinology of reproduction, about bodily mechanisms of reproductive endocrinology
