= European Society of Human Reproduction and Embryology =

Scholarly research organisation

- Founded: 1985
- Type: Not–for-Profit Organization
- Purpose: Human reproduction advocacy
- Headquarters: Strombeek-Bever
- Location: Belgium
- Website: www.eshre.eu

The European Society of Human Reproduction and Embryology (ESHRE) was founded in 1985 by Robert Edwards (University of Cambridge) and Jean Cohen (Paris), who felt that the study and research in the field of reproduction needed to be encouraged and recognized. It is currently headquartered in Belgium.

== Aims ==
The aims of the society are:

- to promote the understanding of reproductive biology and embryology
- to facilitate research and the subsequent dissemination of research findings to the public, scientists, clinicians and patient associations
- to inform politicians and policy makers in Europe.

The society further engages in medical education activities, the development of data registries, and the implementation of methods to improve safety and quality in clinical and laboratory procedures.

== Structure ==
The society consists of:

- General Assembly, comprising all its members, made up of diverse sub-special interest groups, such as andrology, reproductive genetics, ethics and law, and paramedics;
- Executive Committee, comprising 13 members or more, and having various sub-committees, such as the Finance Subcommittee, Training Subcommittee, Annual Meeting Subcommittee, the Committee of National Representatives, and the Communications Committee.

== Medical journal ==
The official journal of the society is Human Reproduction. It is made up of three individual publications: Human Reproduction, Human Reproduction Update and Molecular Human Reproduction.

== See also ==
- American Society for Reproductive Medicine
- Human Fertilisation and Embryology Authority
- Assisted Human Reproduction Canada
