= Fertility and Sterility =

- Discipline: Reproductive medicine
- Language: English
- Edited by: Kurt Barnhart

Publication details
- History: 1950–present
- Publisher: Elsevier on behalf of the American Society for Reproductive Medicine
- Frequency: Monthly
- Impact factor: 7.490 (2021)

Standard abbreviations
- ISO 4: Fertil. Steril.

Indexing
- CODEN: FESTAS
- ISSN: 0015-0282 (print); 1556-5653 (web)
- LCCN: 53020756
- OCLC no.: 01569122

Links
- Journal homepage; Online access; Onlinre archive; Journal page at society website

Fertility and Sterility is a monthly peer-reviewed medical journal published by Elsevier on behalf of the American Society for Reproductive Medicine. It was established in 1950 and is an official journal of several societies (American Society for Reproductive Medicine, Society for Reproductive Endocrinology and Infertility, Society of Reproductive Surgeons, Society for Assisted Reproductive Technology, Society for Male Reproduction and Urology, Pacific Coast Reproductive Society, Canadian Fertility and Andrology Society). The journal covers research in basic and clinical reproduction, primarily concerning human fertility, and addresses related ethical and societal issues.

== History ==
The journal was established in 1950 with Pendleton Tompkins as the first editor-in-chief. The current editor is Kurt Barnhart.

== Abstracting and indexing ==
The journal is abstracted and indexed in the Science Citation Index Expanded and Scopus. According to the Journal Citation Reports, the journal has a 2021 impact factor of 7.490.
