= International Federation of Fertility Societies =

Non-governmental scientific organization

- Founded: 1951
- Type: non-governmental organization
- Purpose: Research, education and advocacy about Fertility
- President: Marcos Horton
- Website: www.iffsreproduction.org

The International Federation of Fertility Societies (IFFS) is an international organization which supports research, education and advocacy related to reproductive and fertility medicine. As an umbrella organization, the IFFS connects about 65 national fertility societies and associated scientists. IFFS is a non-governmental organization (NGO), officially associated with the World Health Organization (WHO).

The predecessor of the IFFS was the International Fertility Association (IFA), founded in 1951 in Rio de Janeiro, Brazil. In 1953, IFA organized the first of a series of World Congresses on Fertility and Sterility. The International Federation of Fertility Societies (IFFS) was formed in 1968, at the Sixth World Conference held in Tel Aviv, Israel. IFFS continues to hold the World Conferences.

The International Federation of Fertility Societies publishes the journal Global Reproductive Health. Its inaugural issue was the report Surveillance 2016, issued in September 2016. This report collected data on global assisted reproductive technology (ART) practices and outcomes. This has been followed by a series of reports.

The International Federation of Fertility Societies has been a leader in researching and addressing the effects of pollutants on reproduction. As many as 1 in 6 couples worldwide have difficulty reproducing, and fertility rates are dropping globally, especially in industrialized regions. Consensus data from the IFFS indicates that the percentage of countries that fall below the total fertility rate has changed from 5% in the 1950s to more than 50%. Only 53% of countries offer financial support for assisted reproductive technologies.

The IFFS has called for public policy changes to reduce exposure to air pollution and other chemicals linked to reproductive harms. They advocate for support for research and medical resources, to make fertility care affordable, accessible, and equitable. Their "More Joy" campaign calls on businesses to take steps to improve work-life balance and better support fertility in the workplace. Suggested steps include flexible work hours, fertility health insurance coverage, paid parental leave, and childcare support.

== Selected publications ==
- Fauser, Bart C J M; Adamson, G David; Boivin, Jacky; Chambers, Georgina M; de Geyter, Christian; Dyer, Silke; Inhorn, Marcia C; Schmidt, Lone; Serour, Gamal I; Tarlatzis, Basil; Zegers-Hochschild, Fernando; Ashiru, Oladapo; Brown, Simon; Bye, Karianne; Calhaz-Jorge, Carlos; Collura, Barbara; De Sutter, Petra; Gianaroli, Luca; Giudice, Linda; Ishihara, Osamu; Mocanu, Edgar V; Ombelet, Willem; Pai, Rishma; Pennings, Guido; Raymer, James; Taylor, Hugh (1 March 2024). "Declining global fertility rates and the implications for family planning and family building: an IFFS consensus document based on a narrative review of the literature". Human Reproduction Update. 30 (2): 153–173. doi:10.1093/humupd/dmad028.
- International Federation of Fertility Societies' (IFFS) Triennial Report 2025: Global Trends in Reproductive Policy and Practice, 10th edition
