= American Society for Reproductive Medicine =

US medical association

- American Society for Reproductive Medicine
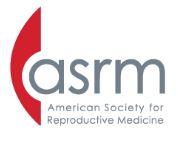
- Abbreviation: ASRM
- Formation: 1944; 82 years ago
- Headquarters: Washington, DC
- President: Amy Sparks, PhD, HCLD
- Chief Executive Officer: Jared C. Robins, M.D., M.B.A.
- Website: www.asrm.org
- Formerly called: American Society for the Study of Sterility, American Fertility Society (AFS)

The American Society for Reproductive Medicine (ASRM) is a nonprofit, multidisciplinary organization for advancement of the science and practice of reproductive medicine. The society has its headquarters in Washington, D.C., and its administrative office in Birmingham, Alabama. An associated special interest group, the Society for Assisted Reproductive Technology (SART), maintains a national registry for tracking IVF attempts and outcomes.

== History and activities ==
Founded in 1944 by a small group of fertility experts who met in Chicago, the initial name was the American Society for the Study of Sterility, changed in 1965 to American Fertility Society (AFS). The current name, American Society for Reproductive Medicine, was adopted in 1994. In 2018, ASRM created its own research institute. In 2019, it moved its headquarters to Washington, D.C., from Birmingham, Alabama.

Though primarily an American organization, it had members from over 100 countries as of 2020. The society hosts an annual scientific congress, as well as courses, seminars, workshops and publications. Special interest groups are focused on a range of reproductive medicine topics. ASRM has an Ethics Committee that provides guidance on ethical issues. The ASRM Practice Committee issues clinical guidelines and reports.

== Society for Assisted Reproductive Technology ==
The Society for Assisted Reproductive Technology (SART) is described as a sister organization or special interest group associated with the American Society for Reproductive Medicine. SART was founded in 1985 by Alan DeCherney and Richard Marrs, with the goal of establishing a national registry to track IVF attempts and outcomes. As of 2014, 375 member clinics were registered with SART in the United States, accounting for 91% of all reported ART cycles. Data are tabulated at clinics, gathered, and reported nationally to the SART Clinical Outcomes Reporting System (CORS) and National ART Surveillance System (NASS). SART's aim is to “promote and advance the standards for the practice of assisted reproductive technology to the benefit of our patients, members, and society at large.” Its committees use registry information to compile measures clinical effectiveness, safety and harm, and quality of care; work with the Centers for Disease Control and Prevention (CDC) to ensure accurate data reporting to CORS and NASS, and set advertising guidelines for clinics and practices.

== World Health Organization association ==
In May 2014, the ASRM became an associated non-state actor (NSA) with the World Health Organization (WHO).

== Publications ==
Publications of the ASRM include:

- Fertility and Sterility – Peer reviewed monthly official publication of the American Society for Reproductive Medicine, Society for Reproductive Endocrinology and Infertility, Society of Reproductive Surgeons, Society for Assisted Reproductive Technology, Society for Male Reproduction and Urology, Pacific Coast Reproductive Society and Canadian Fertility and Andrology Society. Specialist titles in the Fertility and Sterility series include F&S Reports, F&S Reviews and F&S Science.
- Ethics Committee Reports and Statements – Ethical issues in reproduction are addressed by the Ethics Committee that published guidelines for medical practitioners.
- Practice Committee Guidelines – Practice Committee summarizes consensus opinions on medical standards and educational bulletins.
- Patient Education Fact Sheets and Booklets – series produced under the direction of the ASRM Patient Education Committee and the Publications Committee.

== See also ==
- European Society of Human Reproduction and Embryology
- Human Fertilisation and Embryology Authority
- Assisted Human Reproduction Canada
