= Embryo transfer =

Method of assisted reproduction

Embryo transfer 123
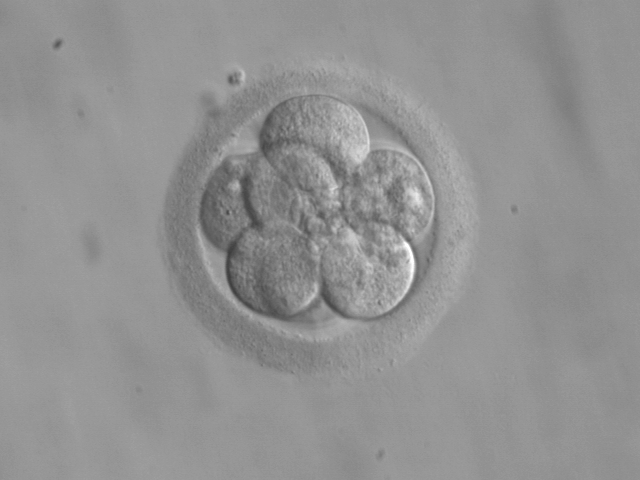
- 8-cell embryo for transfer 3 days after fertilization
- MeSH: D004624

Embryo transfer (aka ET) refers to a step in the process of assisted reproduction in which embryos are placed into the uterus of a female with the intent to establish a pregnancy. This technique - which is often used in connection with in vitro fertilization (IVF) - may be used in humans or in other animals, in which situations and goals may vary.

Embryo transfer can be done at day two or day three during cleavage stage, or on days five to six during blastocyst stage, which was first performed in 1984.

Factors that can affect the success of embryo transfer include the endometrial receptivity, embryo quality, and embryo transfer technique.

== Fresh versus frozen ==
Embryos can be either "fresh" from fertilized egg cells of the same menstrual cycle, or "frozen", that is they have been generated in a preceding cycle and undergone embryo cryopreservation, and are thawed just prior to the transfer, which is then termed "frozen embryo transfer" (FET). The outcome from using cryopreserved embryos has uniformly been positive with no increase in birth defects or development abnormalities, also between fresh versus frozen eggs used for intracytoplasmic sperm injection (ICSI). In fact, pregnancy rates are increased following FET, and perinatal outcomes are less affected, compared to embryo transfer in the same cycle as ovarian hyperstimulation was performed. The endometrium is believed to not be optimally prepared for implantation following ovarian hyperstimulation, and therefore frozen embryo transfer avails for a separate cycle to focus on optimizing the chances of successful implantation. Children born from vitrified blastocysts have significantly higher birthweight than those born from non-frozen blastocysts. When transferring a frozen-thawed oocyte, the chance of pregnancy is essentially the same whether it is transferred in a natural cycle or one with ovulation induction.

There is probably little or no difference between FET and fresh embryo transfers in terms of live birth rate and ongoing pregnancy rate and the risk of ovarian hyperstimulation syndrome may be less using the "freeze all" strategy. The risk of having a large-for-gestational-age baby and higher birth rate, in addition to maternal hypertensive disorders of pregnancy may be increased using a "freeze all" strategy.

== Uterine preparation ==
In the human, the uterine lining (endometrium) needs to be appropriately prepared so that the embryo can implant. In a natural cycle the embryo transfer takes place in the luteal phase at a time where the lining is appropriately undeveloped in relation to the status of the present Luteinizing Hormone. In a stimulated or cycle where a "frozen" embryo is transferred, the recipient woman could be given first estrogen preparations (about 2 weeks), then a combination of estrogen and progesterone so that the lining becomes receptive for the embryo. The time of receptivity is the implantation window. A scientific review in 2013 came to the conclusion that it is not possible to identify one method of endometrium preparation in frozen embryo transfer as being more effective than another.

Limited evidence also supports removal of cervical mucus before transfer.

== Timing ==
Embryo transfer can be performed after various durations of embryo culture, conferring different stages in embryogenesis. The main stages at which embryo transfer is performed are cleavage stage (day 2 to 4 after co-incubation) or the blastocyst stage (day 5 or 6 after co-incubation).

Because in vivo, a cleavage stage embryo still resides in the fallopian tube and it is known that the nutritional environment of the uterus is different from that of the tube, it is postulated that this may cause stress on the embryo if transferred on day 3 resulting in reduced implantation potential. A blastocyst stage embryo does not have this problem as it is best suited for the uterine environment

Embryos who reach the day 3 cell stage can be tested for chromosomal or specific genetic defects prior to possible transfer by preimplantation genetic diagnosis (PGD). Transferring at the blastocyst stage confers a significant increase in live birth rate per transfer, but also confers a decreased number of embryos available for transfer and embryo cryopreservation, so the cumulative clinical pregnancy rates are increased with cleavage stage transfer. It is uncertain whether there is any difference in live birth rate between transfer on day two or day three after fertilization.

Monozygotic twinning is not increased after blastocyst transfer compared with cleavage-stage embryo transfer.

There is a significantly higher odds of preterm birth (odds ratio 1.3) and congenital anomalies (odds ratio 1.3) among births having reached the blastocyst stage compared with cleavage stage. Because of increased female embryo mortality, due to epigenetic modifications induced by extended culture, blastocyst transfer leads to more male births (56.1% male) versus 2 or 3 day transfer (a normal sex ratio of 51.5% male).

== Embryo selection ==
Laboratories have developed grading methods to judge oocyte and embryo quality. In order to optimise pregnancy rates, there is significant evidence that a morphological scoring system is the best strategy for the selection of embryos. Since 2009 where the first time-lapse microscopy system for IVF was approved for clinical use, morphokinetic scoring systems has shown to improve to pregnancy rates further. However, when all different types of time-lapse embryo imaging devices, with or without morphokinetic scoring systems, are compared against conventional embryo assessment for IVF, there is insufficient evidence of a difference in live-birth, pregnancy, stillbirth or miscarriage to choose between them. A small prospectively randomized study in 2016 reported poorer embryo quality and more staff time in an automated time-lapse embryo imaging device compared to conventional embryology. Active efforts to develop a more accurate embryo selection analysis based on Artificial Intelligence and Deep Learning are underway. Embryo Ranking Intelligent Classification Algorithm (ERICA), is a clear example. This Deep Learning software substitutes manual classifications with a ranking system based on an individual embryo's predicted genetic status in a non-invasive fashion. Studies on this area are still pending and current feasibility studies support its potential.

== Procedure ==
The embryo transfer procedure starts by placing a speculum in the vagina to visualize the cervix, which is cleansed with saline solution or culture media. A transfer catheter is loaded with the embryos and handed to the clinician after confirmation of the patient's identity. The catheter is inserted through the cervical canal and advanced into the uterine cavity. Several types of catheters are used for this process, however, there is good evidence that using a soft vs a hard transfer catheter can increase the chances of clinical pregnancy.

There is good and consistent evidence of benefit in ultrasound guidance, that is, making an abdominal ultrasound to ensure correct placement, which is 1–2 cm from the uterine fundus. There is evidence of a significant increase in clinical pregnancy using ultrasound guidance compared with only "clinical touch", as well as performing the transfer with hyaluronic acid enriched transfer media. Anesthesia is generally not required. Single embryo transfers in particular require accuracy and precision in placement within the uterine cavity. The optimal target for embryo placement, known as the maximal implantation potential (MIP) point, is identified using 3D/4D ultrasound. However, there is limited evidence that supports deposition of embryos in the midportion of the uterus.

After insertion of the catheter, the contents are expelled and the embryos are deposited. Limited evidence supports making trial transfers before performing the procedure with embryos. After expulsion, the duration that the catheter remains inside the uterus has no effect on pregnancy rates. Limited evidence suggests avoiding negative pressure from the catheter after expulsion. After withdrawal, the catheter is handed to the embryologist, who inspects it for retained embryos.

In the process of zygote intrafallopian transfer (ZIFT), eggs are removed from the woman, fertilised, and then placed in the woman's fallopian tubes rather than the uterus.

== Embryo number ==
A major issue is how many embryos should be transferred, since placement of multiple embryos carries a risk of multiple pregnancy. While the past physicians placed multiple embryos to increase the chance of pregnancy, this approach has fallen out of favor. Professional societies, and legislatures in many countries, have issued guidelines or laws to curtail the practice. There is low to moderate evidence that making a double embryo transfer during one cycle achieves a higher live birth rate than a single embryo transfer; but making two single embryo transfers in two cycles has the same live birth rate and would avoid multiple pregnancies.

The appropriate number of embryos to be transferred depends on the age of the woman, whether it is the first, second or third full IVF cycle attempt and whether there are top-quality embryos available. According to a guideline from The National Institute for Health and Care Excellence (NICE) in 2013, the number of embryos transferred in a cycle should be chosen as in following table:

Age	Attempt No.	Embryos transferred
<37 years	1st	1
<37 years	2nd	1 if top-quality
<37 years	3rd	No more than 2
37–39 years	1st & 2nd	1 if top-quality
37–39 years	1st & 2nd	2 if no top-quality
37–39 years	3rd	No more than 2
40–42 years		2

=== e-SET ===
The technique of selecting only one embryo to transfer to the woman is called elective-single embryo transfer (e-SET) or, when embryos are at the blastocyst stage, it can also be called elective single blastocyst transfer (eSBT). It significantly lowers the risk of multiple pregnancies, compared with e.g. Double Embryo Transfer (DET) or double blastocyst transfer (2BT), with a twinning rate of approximately 3.5% in sET compared with approximately 38% in DET, or 2% in eSBT compared with approximately 25% in 2BT. At the same time, pregnancy rates is not significantly less with eSBT than with 2BT. That is, the cumulative live birth rate associated with single fresh embryo transfer followed by a single frozen and thawed embryo transfer is comparable with that after one cycle of double fresh embryo transfer. Furthermore, SET has better outcomes in terms of mean gestational age at delivery, mode of delivery, birthweight, and risk of neonatal intensive care unit necessity than DET. e-SET of embryos at the cleavage stage reduces the likelihood of live birth by 38% and multiple birth by 94%. Evidence from randomized, controlled trials suggests that increasing the number of e-SET attempts (fresh and/or frozen) results in a cumulative live birth rate similar to that of DET.

The usage of single embryo transfer is highest in Sweden (69.4%), but as low as 2.8% in the USA. Access to public funding for ART, availability of good cryopreservation facilities, effective education about the risks of multiple pregnancy, and legislation appear to be the most important factors for regional usage of single embryo transfer. Also, personal choice plays a significant role as many subfertile couples have a strong preference for twins.

== Adjunctive procedures ==
It is uncertain whether the use of mechanical closure of the cervical canal following embryo transfer has any effect.

There is considerable evidence that prolonges bed rest (more than 20 minutes) after embryo transfer is associated with reduced chances of clinical pregnancy.

Using hyaluronic acid as an adherence medium for the embryo may increase live birth rates. There may be little or no benefit in having a full bladder, removal of cervical mucus, or flushing of the endometrial or endocervical cavity at the time of embryo transfer. Adjunctive antibiotics in the form of amoxicillin plus clavulanic acid probably does not increase the clinical pregnancy rate compared with no antibiotics. The use of Atosiban, G-CSF and hCG around the time of embryo transfer showed a trend towards increased clinical pregnancy rate.

For frozen-thawed embryo transfer or transfer of embryo from egg donation, no previous ovarian hyperstimulation is required for the recipient before transfer, which can be performed in spontaneous ovulatory cycles. Still, various protocols exist for frozen-thawed embryo transfers as well, such as protocols with ovarian hyperstimulation, protocols in which the endometrium is artificially prepared by estrogen and/or progesterone. There is no evidence that either of these methode is better or worse than another or is more or less harmful. For egg donation, there is evidence of a lower pregnancy rate and a higher cycle cancellation rate when the progesterone supplementation in the recipient is commenced prior to oocyte retrieval from the donor, as compared to commenced day of oocyte retrieval or the day after.

Seminal fluid contains several proteins that interact with epithelial cells of the cervix and uterus, inducing active gestational immune tolerance. There are significantly improved outcomes when women are exposed to seminal plasma around the time of embryo transfer, with statistical significance for clinical pregnancy, but not for ongoing pregnancy or live birth rates with the limited data available.

== Follow-up ==
Patients usually start progesterone medication after egg (also called oocyte) retrieval. While daily intramuscular injections of progesterone-in-oil (PIO) have been the standard route of administration, PIO injections are not FDA-approved for use in pregnancy. A recent meta-analysis showed that the intravaginal route with an appropriate dose and dosing frequency is equivalent to daily intramuscular injections. In addition, a recent case-matched study comparing vaginal progesterone with PIO injections showed that live birth rates were nearly identical with both methods. A duration of progesterone administration of 11 days results in almost the same birth rates as longer durations.

Patients are also given estrogen medication in some cases after the embryo transfer. Pregnancy testing is done typically two weeks after egg retrieval.

== History ==
The first transfer of an embryo from one human to another resulting in pregnancy was reported in July 1983 and subsequently led to the announcement of the first human birth 3 February 1984. This procedure was performed at the Harbor UCLA Medical Center under the direction of Dr. John Buster and the University of California at Los Angeles School of Medicine.

In the procedure, an embryo that was just beginning to develop was transferred from one woman in whom it had been conceived by artificial insemination to another woman who gave birth to the infant 38 weeks later. The sperm used in the artificial insemination came from the husband of the woman who bore the baby.

This scientific breakthrough established standards and became an agent of change for women with infertility and for women who did not want to pass on genetic disorders to their children. Donor embryo transfer has given women a mechanism to become pregnant and give birth to a child that will contain their husband's genetic makeup. Although donor embryo transfer as practiced today has evolved from the original non-surgical method, it now accounts for approximately 5% of in vitro fertilization recorded births.

Prior to this, thousands of women who were infertile, had adoption as the only path to parenthood. This set the stage to allow open and candid discussion of embryo donation and transfer. This breakthrough has given way to the donation of human embryos as a common practice similar to other donations such as blood and major organ donations. At the time of this announcement the event was captured by major news carriers and fueled healthy debate and discussion on this practice which impacted the future of reproductive medicine by creating a platform for further advancements in woman's health.

This work established the technical foundation and legal-ethical framework surrounding the clinical use of human oocyte and embryo donation, a mainstream clinical practice, which has evolved over the past 25 years.

== Effectiveness ==
Fresh blastocyst (day 5 to 6) stage transfer seems to be more effective than cleavage (day 2 or 3) stage transfer in assisted reproductive technologies. For women with a good prognosis for pregnancy, live birth-rate seems to be higher with blastocyst-stage embryo transfer than cleavage-stage. This means that if 39% of women achieve pregnancy after fresh cleavage-stage embryo transfer, between 43% and 48% will likely do with blastocyst-stage transfer.It could be that fresh transfer increases the life birth-rate. Recent systematic review showed that along with selection of embryo, the techniques followed during transfer procedure may result in successful pregnancy outcome. The following interventions are supported by the literature for improving pregnancy rates:

• Abdominal ultrasound guidance for embryo transfer

• Removal of cervical mucus

• Use of soft embryo transfer catheters

• Placement of embryo transfer tip in the upper or middle (central) area of the uterine cavity, greater than 1 cm from the fundus, for embryo expulsion

• Immediate ambulation once the embryo transfer procedure is completed

== Embryo transfer in animals ==
Embryo transfer techniques allow top quality female livestock to have a greater influence on the genetic advancement of a herd or flock in much the same way that artificial insemination has allowed greater use of superior sires. ET also allows the continued use of animals such as competition mares to continue training and showing, while producing foals. The general epidemiological aspects of embryo transfer indicates that the transfer of embryos provides the opportunity to introduce genetic material into populations of livestock while greatly reducing the risk for transmission of infectious diseases. Recent developments in the sexing of embryos before transfer and implanting has great potential in the dairy and other livestock industries.

Embryo transfer is also used in laboratory mice. For example, embryos of genetically modified strains that are difficult to breed or expensive to maintain may be stored frozen, and only thawed and implanted into a pseudopregnant dam when needed.

On February 19, 2020, the first pair of Cheetah cubs to be conceived through embryo transfer from a surrogate cheetah mother was born at Columbus Zoo in Ohio.

=== Frozen embryo transfer in animals ===
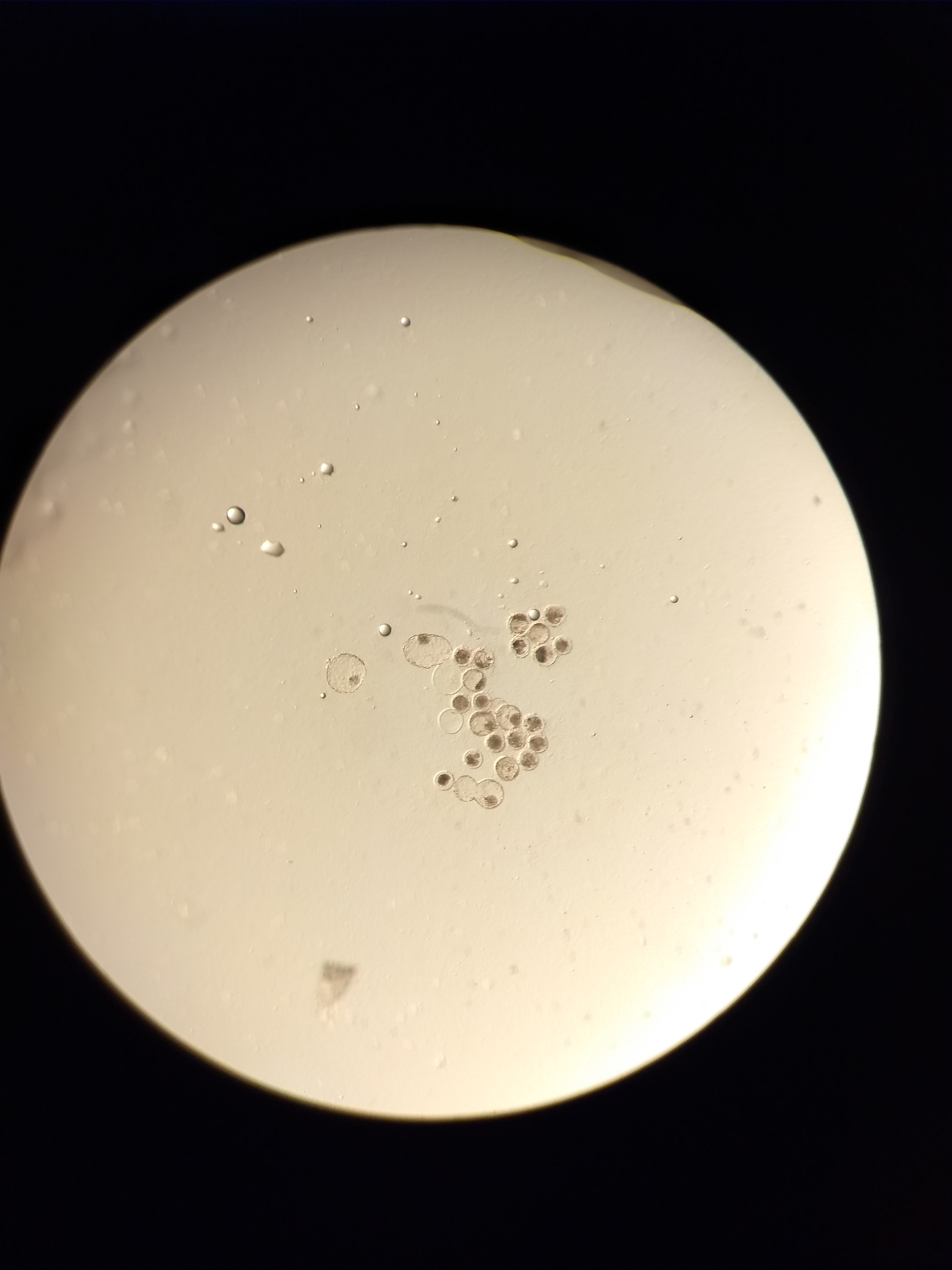
Bovine embryos in vitro.

The development of various methods of cryopreservation of bovine embryos improved embryo transfer technique considerably efficient technology, no longer depending on the immediate readiness of suitable recipients. Pregnancy rates are just slightly less than those achieved with fresh embryos. Recently, the use of cryoprotectants such as ethylene glycol has permitted the direct transfer of bovine embryos. The world's first live crossbred bovine calf produced under tropical conditions by Direct Transfer (DT) of embryo frozen in ethylene glycol freeze media was born on 23 June 1996. Dr. Binoy Sebastian Vettical of Kerala Livestock Development Board Ltd has produced the embryo stored frozen in Ethylene Glycol freeze media by slow programmable freezing (SPF) technique and transferred directly to recipient cattle immediately after thawing the frozen straw in water for the birth of this calf. In a study, in vivo produced crossbred bovine embryos stored frozen in ethylene glycol freeze media were transferred directly to recipients under tropical conditions and achieved a pregnancy rate of 50 percent. In a survey of the North American embryo transfer industry, embryo transfer success rates from direct transfer of embryos were as good as to those achieved with glycerol. Moreover, in 2011, more than 95% of frozen-thawed embryos were transferred by Direct Transfer.
