= In vitro fertilisation =

Assisted reproductive technology procedure

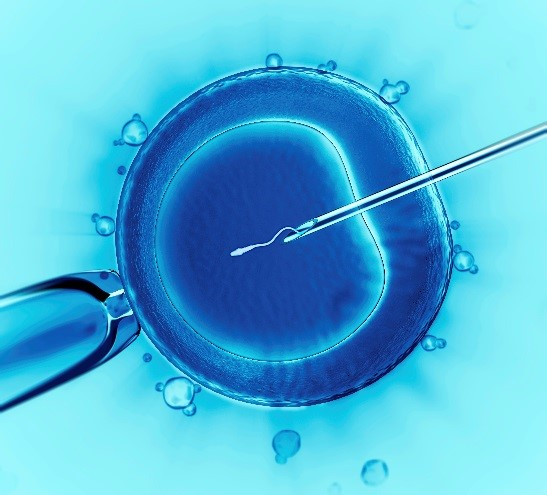
- This image shows intracytoplasmic sperm injection, the most commonly used IVF technique.
- Specialty: Endocrinology, gynecology
- ICD-10-PCS: 8E0ZXY1

In vitro fertilisation (IVF) is a process of fertilisation in which an egg is combined with sperm in vitro ("in glass"). The process involves monitoring and stimulating the ovulatory process, then removing an ovum or ova (egg or eggs) from the ovaries and enabling sperm to fertilise them in a culture medium in a laboratory. After a fertilised egg (zygote) undergoes embryo culture for 2–6 days, it is transferred by catheter into the uterus, with the intention of establishing a successful pregnancy.

IVF is a type of assisted reproductive technology (ART) used to treat infertility, enable gestational surrogacy, and, in combination with pre-implantation genetic testing, avoid the transmission of abnormal genetic conditions. When a fertilised egg from egg and sperm donors implants in the uterus of a genetically unrelated surrogate, the resulting child is also genetically unrelated to the surrogate. Some countries have banned or otherwise regulated the availability of IVF treatment, giving rise to fertility tourism. Financial cost and age may also restrict the availability of IVF as a means of carrying a healthy pregnancy to term.

In July 1978, Louise Brown was the first child successfully born after her mother received IVF treatment. Brown was born as a result of natural-cycle IVF, where no stimulation was made. The procedure took place at Dr Kershaw's Cottage Hospital in Royton, Oldham, England. Robert Edwards, surviving member of the development team, was awarded the Nobel Prize in Physiology or Medicine in 2010.

When assisted by egg donation and IVF, many women who have reached menopause, have infertile partners, or have idiopathic female-fertility issues, can still become pregnant. After the IVF treatment, some couples get pregnant without any fertility treatments. In 2023, it was estimated that twelve million children had been born worldwide using IVF and other assisted reproduction techniques. A 2019 study that evaluated the use of 10 adjuncts with IVF (screening hysteroscopy, DHEA, testosterone, GH, aspirin, heparin, antioxidants, seminal plasma, and PRP) suggested that (except for hysteroscopy) these adjuncts should be avoided until there is more evidence to show that they are safe and effective.

== Terminology ==
The Latin term in vitro, meaning "in glass", is used because early biological experiments involving cultivation of tissues outside the living organism were carried out in glass containers, such as beakers, test tubes, or Petri dishes. The modern scientific term "in vitro" refers to any biological procedure that is performed outside the organism in which it would normally have occurred, to distinguish it from an in vivo procedure (such as in vivo fertilisation), where the tissue remains inside the living organism in which it is normally found.

A colloquial term for babies conceived as the result of IVF, "test tube babies", refers to the tube-shaped containers of glass or plastic resin, called test tubes, that are commonly used in chemistry and biology labs. However, IVF is usually performed in Petri dishes, which are both wider and shallower and often used to cultivate cultures.

IVF is a form of assisted reproductive technology.

== History ==
The first successful birth of a child after IVF treatment, Louise Brown, occurred in 1978. Louise Brown was born as a result of natural cycle IVF, where no stimulation was made. The procedure took place at Dr Kershaw's Cottage Hospital (now Dr Kershaw's Hospice) in Royton, Oldham, England. Robert G. Edwards, the physiologist who co-developed the treatment, was awarded the Nobel Prize in Physiology or Medicine in 2010. His co-workers, Patrick Steptoe and Jean Purdy, who had died in 1988 and 1985 respectively, were not eligible for consideration as the Nobel Prize is not awarded posthumously.

The second successful birth of a 'test tube baby' occurred in India on 3 October 1978, just 70 days after Louise Brown was born. The girl, named Durga, was conceived in vitro using a method developed independently by Subhash Mukhopadhyay, a physician and researcher from Hazaribag. Mukhopadhyay had been performing experiments on his own with primitive instruments and a household refrigerator. However, state authorities prevented him from presenting his work at scientific conferences, and it was many years before Mukhopadhyay's contribution was acknowledged in works dealing with the subject.

Adriana Iliescu held the record as the oldest woman to give birth using IVF and a donor egg, when she gave birth in 2004 at the age of 66, a record passed in 2006. After the IVF treatment, some couples can get pregnant without any fertility treatments. In 2018, it was estimated that eight million children had been born worldwide using IVF and other assisted reproduction techniques.

== Medical uses ==
=== Indications ===
IVF may be used to overcome female infertility when it is due to problems with the fallopian tubes, making in vivo fertilisation difficult. It can also assist in male infertility, in those cases where there is a defect in sperm quality; in such situations, intracytoplasmic sperm injection (ICSI) may be used, where a sperm cell is injected directly into the egg cell. This is used when sperm have difficulty penetrating the egg. ICSI is also used when sperm numbers are very low. When indicated, ICSI has been found to increase the success rates of IVF.

According to the UK's National Institute for Health and Care Excellence (NICE) guidelines, IVF treatment is appropriate in cases of unexplained infertility for people who have not conceived after 2 years of regular unprotected sexual intercourse.

In people with anovulation, it may be an alternative after 7–12 attempted cycles of ovulation induction, since the latter is expensive and easier to control.

=== Success rates ===
IVF success rates are the percentage of all IVF procedures that result in favourable outcomes. Depending on the type of calculation used, this outcome may represent the number of confirmed pregnancies, called the pregnancy rate, or the number of live births, called the live birth rate. Due to advances in reproductive technology, live birth rates by cycle five of IVF have increased from 76% in 2005 to 80% in 2010, despite a reduction in the number of embryos being transferred (which decreased the multiple birth rate from 25% to 8%).

The success rate depends on various factors such as the woman's age, the cause of infertility, embryo status, reproductive history, and lifestyle. Younger candidates of IVF are more likely to get pregnant. People older than 41 are more likely to get pregnant with a donor egg. People who have been previously pregnant are in many cases more successful with IVF treatments than those who have never been pregnant.

==== Live birth rate ====
The live birth rate is the percentage of all IVF cycles that lead to a live birth. This rate does not include miscarriage or stillbirth; multiple-order births, such as twins and triplets, are counted as one pregnancy.

A 2021 summary compiled by the Society for Assisted Reproductive Technology (SART), which reports the average IVF success rates in the United States per age group using non-donor eggs, compiled the following data:

| | < 35 | 35–37 | 38–40 | 41–42 | > 42 |
|---|---|---|---|---|---|
| Live birth rate (%) | 54 | 40.5 | 26 | 13.3 | 4 |

In 2006, Canadian clinics reported a live birth rate of 27%. Birth rates in younger patients were slightly higher, with a success rate of 35.3% for those 21 and younger, the youngest group evaluated. Success rates for older patients were also lower and decreased with age, with 37-year-olds at 27.4% and no live births for those older than 48, the oldest group evaluated. Some clinics exceeded these rates. It is impossible to determine whether that is due to superior technique or patient selection, since it is possible to artificially increase success rates by refusing to accept the most difficult patients or steering them into oocyte donation cycles (which are compiled separately). Further, pregnancy rates can be increased by the placement of several embryos, at the risk of increasing the chance for multiples.

Because not every IVF cycle that is started will lead to oocyte retrieval or embryo transfer, reports of live birth rates need to specify the denominator, namely, IVF cycles started, IVF retrievals, or embryo transfers. The SART summarised 2008–9 success rates for US clinics for fresh embryo cycles that did not involve donor eggs and gave live birth rates by the age of the prospective mother, with a peak at 41.3% per cycle started and 47.3% per embryo transfer for patients under 35 years of age.

IVF attempts in multiple cycles result in increased cumulative live birth rates. Depending on the demographic group, one study reported 45% to 53% for three attempts, and 51% to 71% to 80% for six attempts.

According to the 2021 National Summary Report compiled by the Society for Assisted Reproductive Technology (SART), the mean number of embryos transferred for patients achieving live birth is as follows:

| | < 35 | 35–37 | 38–40 | 41–42 | > 42 |
|---|---|---|---|---|---|
| Mean # of transfers | 1.33 | 1.28 | 1.19 | 1.11 | 1.10 |

Effective from 15 February 2021, the majority of Australian IVF clinics publish their individual success rate online via YourIVFSuccess.com.au. This site also contains a predictor tool.

==== Pregnancy rate ====
Pregnancy rate may be defined in various ways. In the United States, SART and the Centers for Disease Control (and appearing in the table in the Success Rates section above) include statistics on positive pregnancy test and clinical pregnancy rate.

The 2019 summary compiled by the SART includes the following data for non-donor eggs (first embryo transfer) in the United States:

| | <35 | 35-37 | 38-40 | 41–42 | >42 |
|---|---|---|---|---|---|
| Positive pregnancy test rate (%) | 55.1 | 44.8 | 32.9 | 19.1 | 8.5 |
| Clinical pregnancy rate (%) | 47.5 | 38.3 | 27.5 | 15.5 | 6.3 |

In 2006, Canadian clinics reported an average pregnancy rate of 35%. A French study estimated that 66% of patients starting IVF treatment finally succeed in having a child (40% during the IVF treatment at the centre and 26% after IVF discontinuation). Achievement of having a child after IVF discontinuation was mainly due to adoption (46%) or spontaneous pregnancy (42%).

==== Miscarriage rate ====
According to a study done by the Mayo Clinic, miscarriage rates for IVF are somewhere between 15 and 25% for those under the age of 35. In naturally conceived pregnancies, the rate of miscarriage is between 10 and 20% for those under the age of 35. Risk of miscarriage, regardless of the method of conception, does increase with age.

==== Predictors of success ====
The main potential factors that influence pregnancy (and live birth) rates in IVF have been suggested to be maternal age, duration of infertility or subfertility, bFSH and number of oocytes, all reflecting ovarian function. Optimal age is 23–39 years at time of treatment.

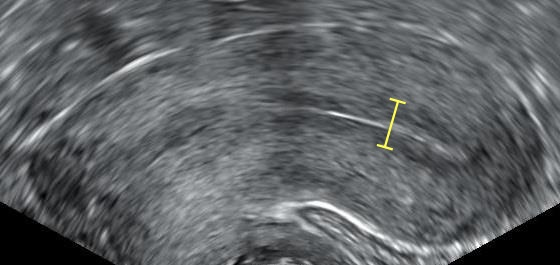
A triple-line endometrium is associated with better IVF outcomes.

Biomarkers that affect the pregnancy chances of IVF include:

- Antral follicle count, with higher count giving higher success rates.
- Anti-Müllerian hormone levels, with higher levels indicating higher chances of pregnancy, as well as of live birth after IVF, even after adjusting for age.
- Level of DNA fragmentation as measured, e.g. by Comet assay, advanced maternal age and semen quality.
- People with ovary-specific FMR1 genotypes including het-norm/low have significantly decreased pregnancy chances in IVF.
- Progesterone elevation on the day of induction of final maturation is associated with lower pregnancy rates in IVF cycles in women undergoing ovarian stimulation using GnRH analogues and gonadotrophins. At this time, compared to a progesterone level below 0.8 ng/ml, a level between 0.8 and 1.1 ng/ml confers an odds ratio of pregnancy of approximately 0.8, and a level between 1.2 and 3.0 ng/ml confers an odds ratio of pregnancy of between 0.6 and 0.7. On the other hand, progesterone elevation does not seem to confer a decreased chance of pregnancy in frozen–thawed cycles and cycles with egg donation.
- Characteristics of cells from the cumulus oophorus and the membrana granulosa, which are easily aspirated during oocyte retrieval. These cells are closely associated with the oocyte and share the same microenvironment, and the rate of expression of certain genes in such cells is associated with higher or lower pregnancy rate.
- An endometrial thickness (EMT) of less than 7 mm decreases the pregnancy rate by an odds ratio of approximately 0.4 compared to an EMT of over 7 mm. However, such low thickness rarely occurs, and any routine use of this parameter is regarded as not justified.

Other determinants of outcome of IVF include:

- As maternal age increases, the likelihood of conception decreases and the chance of miscarriage increases.
- With increasing paternal age, especially 50 years and older, the rate of blastocyst formation decreases.
- Tobacco smoking reduces the chances of IVF producing a live birth by 34% and increases the risk of an IVF pregnancy miscarrying by 30%.
- Air pollution, including particulate matter (PM_{2.5} and PM_{10}), has been linked to poorer outcomes following IVF
- A body mass index (BMI) over 27 causes a 33% decrease in likelihood to have a live birth after the first cycle of IVF, compared to those with a BMI between 20 and 27. Also, pregnant people who are obese have higher rates of miscarriage, gestational diabetes, hypertension, thromboembolism and problems during delivery, as well as leading to an increased risk of fetal congenital abnormality. Ideal body mass index is 19–30, and many clinics restrict this BMI range as a criterion for initiation of the IVF process.
- Salpingectomy or laparoscopic tubal occlusion before IVF treatment increases chances for people with hydrosalpinges.
- Success with previous pregnancy and/or live birth increases chances
- Low alcohol/caffeine intake increases success rate
- The number of embryos transferred in the treatment cycle
- Embryo quality
- Some studies also suggest that autoimmune disease may also play a role in decreasing IVF success rates by interfering with the proper implantation of the embryo after transfer.

Aspirin is sometimes prescribed to people for the purpose of increasing the chances of conception by IVF, but as of 2016 there was no evidence to show that it is safe and effective.

A 2013 review and meta analysis of randomised controlled trials of acupuncture as an adjuvant therapy in IVF found no overall benefit, and concluded that an apparent benefit detected in a subset of published trials where the control group (those not using acupuncture) experienced a lower than average rate of pregnancy requires further study, due to the possibility of publication bias and other factors.

A Cochrane review came to the result that endometrial injury performed in the month before ovarian induction appeared to increase both the live birth rate and clinical pregnancy rate in IVF compared with no endometrial injury. There was no evidence of a difference between the groups in miscarriage, multiple pregnancy, or bleeding rates. Evidence suggested that endometrial injury on the day of oocyte retrieval was associated with a lower live birth or ongoing pregnancy rate.

Intake of antioxidants (such as N-acetyl-cysteine, melatonin, vitamin A, vitamin C, vitamin E, folic acid, myo-inositol, zinc or selenium) has not been associated with a significantly increased live birth rate or clinical pregnancy rate in IVF according to Cochrane reviews. The review found that oral antioxidants given to the sperm donor with male factor or unexplained subfertility may improve live birth rates, but more evidence is needed.

A Cochrane review in 2015 concluded that there is no evidence identified regarding the effect of preconception lifestyle advice on the chance of a live birth outcome.

== Method ==
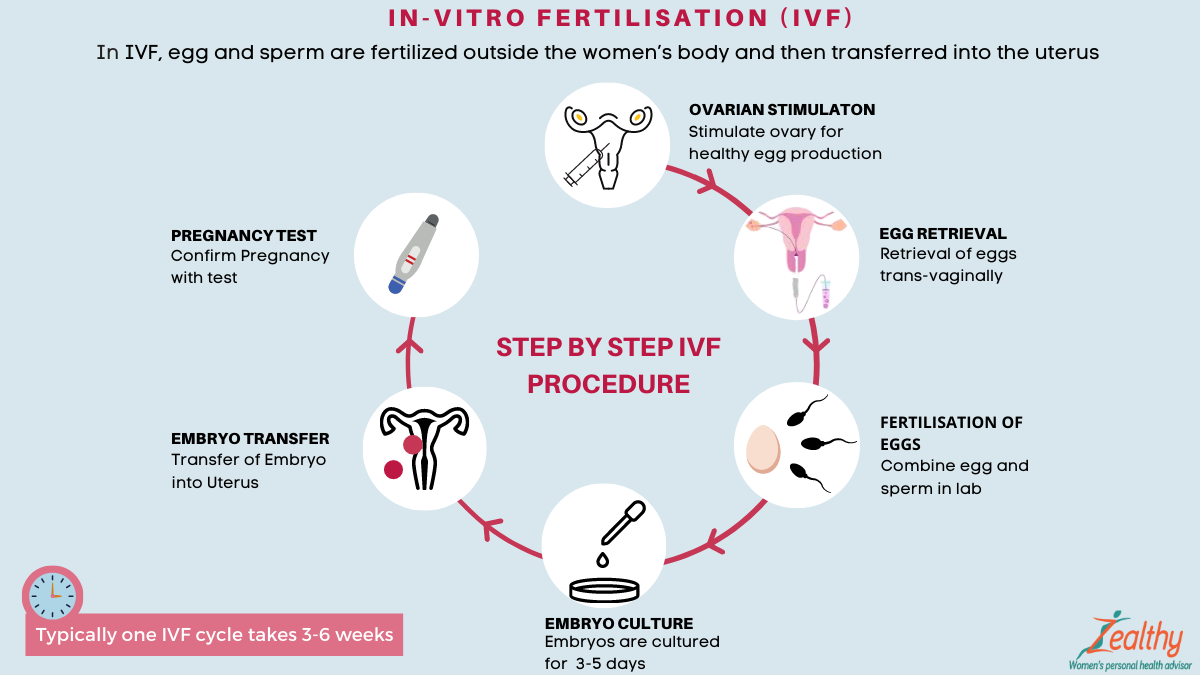
A graphic explaining the details of IVF

Theoretically, IVF could be performed by collecting the contents from the fallopian tubes or uterus after natural ovulation, mixing it with sperm, and reinserting the fertilised ova into the uterus. However, without additional techniques, the chances of pregnancy would be extremely small. The additional techniques that are routinely used in IVF include ovarian hyperstimulation to generate multiple eggs, ultrasound-guided transvaginal oocyte retrieval directly from the ovaries, co-incubation of eggs and sperm, as well as culture and selection of resultant embryos before embryo transfer into a uterus.

=== Ovarian hyperstimulation ===
Ovarian hyperstimulation is the stimulation to induce the development of multiple follicles of the ovaries. It should start with response prediction based on factors such as age, antral follicle count and level of anti-Müllerian hormone. The resulting prediction (e.g. poor or hyper-response to ovarian hyperstimulation) determines the protocol and dosage for ovarian hyperstimulation.

Ovarian hyperstimulation also includes suppression of spontaneous ovulation, for which two main methods are available: Using a (usually longer) GnRH agonist protocol or a (usually shorter) GnRH antagonist protocol. In a standard long GnRH agonist protocol, the day when hyperstimulation treatment is started and the expected day of later oocyte retrieval can be chosen to conform to personal choice, while in a GnRH antagonist protocol, it must be adapted to the spontaneous onset of the previous menstruation. On the other hand, the GnRH antagonist protocol has a lower risk of ovarian hyperstimulation syndrome (OHSS), which is a life-threatening complication.

For the ovarian hyperstimulation in itself, injectable gonadotropins (usually FSH analogues) are generally used under close monitoring. Such monitoring frequently checks the estradiol level and, by means of gynecologic ultrasonography, follicular growth. Typically, approximately 10 days of injections will be necessary.

When stimulating ovulation after suppressing endogenous secretion, it is necessary to supply exogenous gonadotropins. The most common one is the human menopausal gonadotropin (hMG), which is obtained by donation of menopausal women. Other pharmacological preparations are FSH+LH or coripholitropine alpha.

=== Natural IVF ===
There are several methods termed natural cycle IVF:

- IVF using no drugs for ovarian hyperstimulation, while drugs for ovulation suppression may still be used.
- IVF using ovarian hyperstimulation, including gonadotropins, but with a GnRH antagonist protocol so that the cycle initiates from natural mechanisms.
- Frozen embryo transfer; IVF using ovarian hyperstimulation, followed by embryo cryopreservation, followed by embryo transfer in a later, natural, cycle.

IVF using no drugs for ovarian hyperstimulation was the method for the conception of Louise Brown. This method can be successfully used when people want to avoid taking ovarian-stimulating drugs with their associated side effects. HFEA has estimated the live birth rate to be approximately 1.3% per IVF cycle using no hyperstimulation drugs for women aged between 40 and 42.

Mild IVF is a method where a small dose of ovarian-stimulating drugs is used for a short duration during a natural menstrual cycle, aimed at producing 2–7 eggs and creating healthy embryos. This method appears to be an advance in the field to reduce complications and side effects for women, and it is aimed at the quality, not quantity, of eggs and embryos. One study comparing a mild treatment (mild ovarian stimulation with GnRH antagonist co-treatment combined with single embryo transfer) to a standard treatment (stimulation with a GnRH agonist long-protocol and transfer of two embryos) came to the result that the proportions of cumulative pregnancies that resulted in term live birth after 1 year were 43.4% with mild treatment and 44.7% with standard treatment. Mild IVF can be cheaper than conventional IVF and with a significantly reduced risk of multiple gestation and OHSS.

=== Final maturation induction ===
When the ovarian follicles have reached a certain degree of development, induction of final oocyte maturation is performed, generally by an injection of human chorionic gonadotropin (hCG). Commonly, this is known as the "trigger shot." hCG acts as an analogue of luteinising hormone, and ovulation would occur between 38 and 40 hours after a single HCG injection, but the egg retrieval is performed at a time usually between 34 and 36 hours after hCG injection, that is, just before when the follicles would rupture. This applies to scheduling the egg retrieval procedure when the eggs are fully mature. HCG injection confers a risk of ovarian hyperstimulation syndrome. Using a GnRH agonist instead of hCG eliminates most of the risk of ovarian hyperstimulation syndrome, but with a reduced delivery rate if the embryos are transferred fresh. For this reason, many centers will freeze all oocytes or embryos following agonist trigger.

=== Egg retrieval ===
The eggs are retrieved from the patient using a transvaginal technique called transvaginal ultrasound aspiration, involving an ultrasound-guided needle being injected through the follicles upon collection. Through this needle, the oocyte and follicular fluid are aspirated, and the follicular fluid is then passed to an embryologist to identify ova. It is common to remove between ten and thirty eggs. The retrieval process, which lasts approximately 20 to 40 minutes, is performed under conscious sedation or general anesthesia to ensure patient comfort. Following optimal follicular development, the eggs are meticulously retrieved using transvaginal ultrasound guidance with the aid of a specialised ultrasound probe and a fine needle aspiration technique. The follicular fluid, containing the retrieved eggs, is expeditiously transferred to the embryology laboratory for subsequent processing.

=== Egg and sperm preparation ===
In the laboratory, for ICSI treatments, the identified eggs are stripped of surrounding cells (also known as cumulus cells) and prepared for fertilisation. An oocyte selection may be performed before fertilisation to select eggs that can be fertilised, as it is required that they are in metaphase II. There are cases in which if oocytes are in the metaphase I stage, they can be kept cultured so as to undergo a posterior sperm injection. In the meantime, semen is prepared for fertilisation by removing inactive cells and seminal fluid in a process called sperm washing. If semen is being provided by a sperm donor, it will usually have been prepared for treatment before being frozen and quarantined, and it will be thawed ready for use.

=== Co-incubation ===
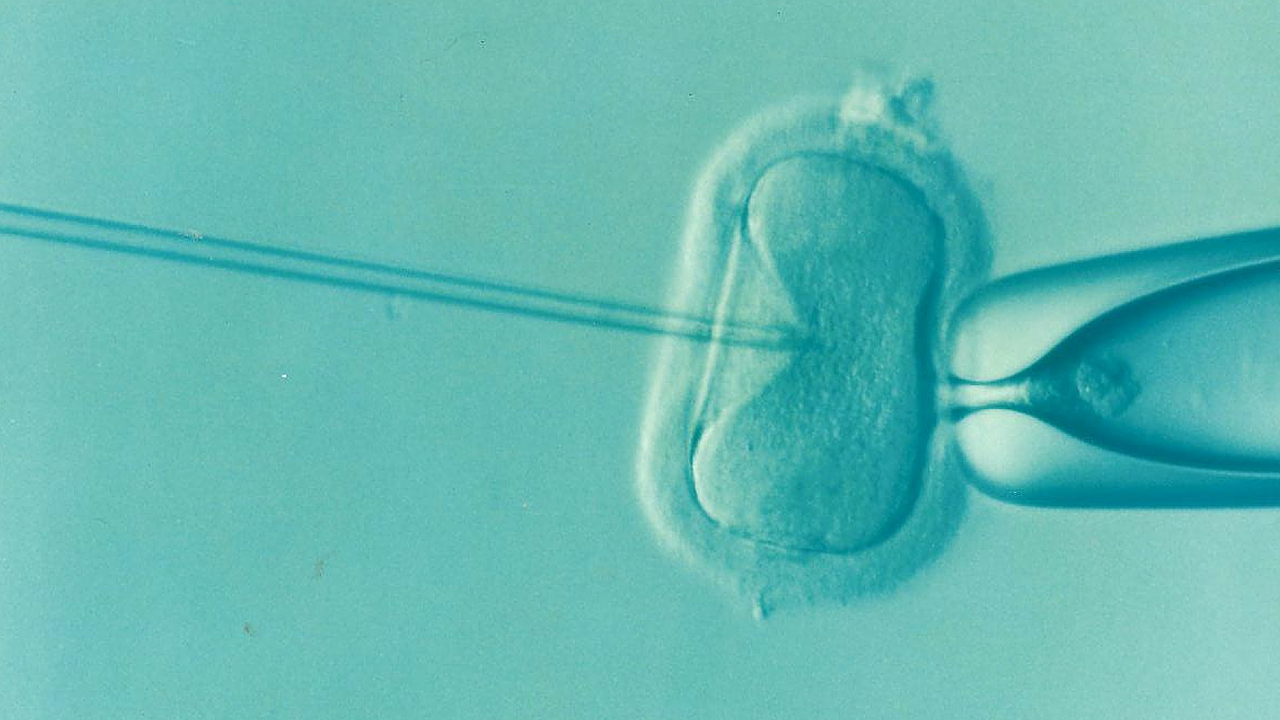
Demonstration of ICSI

The sperm and the egg are incubated together at a ratio of about 75,000:1 in a culture media for the actual fertilisation to take place. A review in 2013 concluded that a duration of this co-incubation of about 1 to 4 hours results in significantly higher pregnancy rates than 16 to 24 hours. In most cases, the egg will be fertilised during co-incubation and will show two pronuclei. In certain situations, such as low sperm count or motility, a single sperm may be injected directly into the egg using intracytoplasmic sperm injection (ICSI). The fertilised egg is placed in a special growth medium and left for about 48 hours until the embryo consists of six to eight cells.

In gamete intrafallopian transfer, eggs are removed from the woman and placed in one of the fallopian tubes, along with the man's sperm. This allows fertilisation to take place inside the woman's body. Therefore, this variation is actually an in vivo fertilisation, not in vitro.

=== Embryo culture ===
The main durations of embryo culture are until cleavage stage (day two to four after co-incubation) or the blastocyst stage (day five or six after co-incubation). Embryo culture until the blastocyst stage confers a significant increase in live birth rate per embryo transfer, but also confers a decreased number of embryos available for transfer and embryo cryopreservation, so the cumulative clinical pregnancy rates are increased with cleavage stage transfer. Transfer day two instead of day three after fertilisation has no differences in live birth rate. There are significantly higher odds of preterm birth (odds ratio 1.3) and congenital anomalies (odds ratio 1.3) among births having embryos cultured until the blastocyst stage compared with the cleavage stage.

=== Embryo selection ===
Laboratories have developed grading methods to judge oocyte and embryo quality. To optimise pregnancy rates, there is significant evidence that a morphological scoring system is the best strategy for the selection of embryos. Since 2009 where the first time-lapse microscopy system for IVF was approved for clinical use, morphokinetic scoring systems has shown to improve to pregnancy rates further. However, when all different types of time-lapse embryo imaging devices, with or without morphokinetic scoring systems, are compared against conventional embryo assessment for IVF, there is insufficient evidence of a difference in live-birth, pregnancy, stillbirth or miscarriage to choose between them. Active efforts to develop a more accurate embryo selection analysis based on Artificial Intelligence and Deep Learning are underway. Embryo Ranking Intelligent Classification Assistant (ERICA), is a clear example. This Deep Learning software substitutes manual classifications with a ranking system based on an individual embryo's predicted genetic status in a non-invasive fashion. Studies on this area are still pending, and current feasibility studies support its potential.

=== Embryo transfer ===
The number to be transferred depends on the number available, the patient's age, and other health and diagnostic factors. In countries such as Canada, the UK, Australia, and New Zealand, a maximum of two embryos is transferred except in unusual circumstances. In the UK, according to HFEA regulations, a woman over 40 may have up to three embryos transferred. In the US, there is no legal limit on the number of embryos that may be transferred, although medical associations have provided practice guidelines. Most clinics and country regulatory bodies seek to minimise the risk of multiple pregnancy, as it is not uncommon for multiple embryos to implant if multiple embryos are transferred. Embryos are transferred to the patient's uterus through a thin, plastic catheter, which goes through their vagina and cervix. Several embryos may be passed into the uterus to improve chances of implantation and pregnancy.

=== Luteal support ===
Luteal support is the administration of medication, generally progesterone, progestins, hCG, or GnRH agonists, and often accompanied by estradiol, to increase the success rate of implantation and early embryogenesis, thereby complementing and/or supporting the function of the corpus luteum. A Cochrane review found that hCG or progesterone given during the luteal phase may be associated with higher rates of live birth or ongoing pregnancy, but that the evidence is not conclusive. Co-treatment with GnRH agonists appears to improve outcomes, by a live birth rate RD of +16% (95% confidence interval +10 to +22%). On the other hand, growth hormone or aspirin as adjunctive medication in IVF have no evidence of overall benefit.

== Expansions ==
There are various expansions or additional techniques that can be applied in IVF, which are usually not necessary for the IVF procedure itself, but would be virtually impossible or technically difficult to perform without concomitantly performing methods of IVF.

=== Preimplantation genetic screening or diagnosis ===
Preimplantation genetic screening (PGS) or preimplantation genetic diagnosis (PGD) has been suggested for use in IVF to select an embryo that appears to have the greatest chances for successful pregnancy. However, a systematic review and meta-analysis of existing randomised controlled trials came to the result that there is no evidence of a beneficial effect of PGS with cleavage-stage biopsy as measured by live birth rate. On the contrary, for those of advanced maternal age, PGS with cleavage-stage biopsy significantly lowers the live birth rate. Technical drawbacks, such as the invasiveness of the biopsy, and non-representative samples because of mosaicism are the major underlying factors for inefficacy of PGS.

Still, as an expansion of IVF, patients who can benefit from PGS/PGD include:

- Those who have a family history of inherited disease
- Those who want prenatal sex discernment. This can be used to diagnose monogenic disorders with sex linkage. It can potentially be used for sex selection, wherein a fetus is aborted if having an undesired sex.
- Those who already have a child with an incurable disease and need compatible cells from a second healthy child to cure the first, resulting in a "saviour sibling" that matches the sick child in HLA type.

PGS screens for numerical chromosomal abnormalities, while PGD identifies the specific molecular defect of the inherited disease. In both PGS and PGD, individual cells from a pre-embryo, or preferably trophectoderm cells biopsied from a blastocyst, are analysed during the IVF process. Before the transfer of a pre-embryo back to a person's uterus, one or two cells are removed from the pre-embryos (8-cell stage), or preferably from a blastocyst. These cells are then evaluated for normality. Typically, within one to two days, following completion of the evaluation, only the normal pre-embryos are transferred back to the uterus. Alternatively, a blastocyst can be cryopreserved via vitrification and transferred at a later date to the uterus. In addition, PGS can significantly reduce the risk of multiple pregnancies because fewer embryos, ideally just one, are needed for implantation.

=== Cryopreservation ===
Cryopreservation can be performed as oocyte cryopreservation before fertilisation, or as embryo cryopreservation after fertilisation.

The Rand Consulting Group estimated there to be 400,000 frozen embryos in the United States in 2006. The advantage is that patients who fail to conceive may become pregnant using such embryos without having to go through a full IVF cycle. Or, if pregnancy occurred, they could return later for another pregnancy. Spare oocytes or embryos resulting from fertility treatments may be used for oocyte donation or embryo donation to another aspiring parent, and embryos may be created, frozen, and stored specifically for transfer and donation by using donor eggs and sperm. Also, oocyte cryopreservation can be used for those who are likely to lose their ovarian reserve due to undergoing chemotherapy.

By 2017, many centres had adopted embryo cryopreservation as their primary IVF therapy and performed few or no fresh embryo transfers. The two main reasons for this have been better endometrial receptivity when embryos are transferred in cycles without exposure to ovarian stimulation and also the ability to store the embryos while awaiting the results of preimplantation genetic testing.

The outcome of using cryopreserved embryos has uniformly been positive, with no increase in birth defects or developmental abnormalities.

=== Sperm selection ===
Intracytoplasmic sperm injection (ICSI) is where a single sperm is injected directly into an egg. Its main usage as an expansion of IVF is to overcome male infertility problems. It may also be used where eggs cannot easily be penetrated by sperm, and occasionally in conjunction with sperm donation. It can be used in teratozoospermia, since once the egg is fertilised, abnormal sperm morphology does not appear to influence blastocyst development or blastocyst morphology.

Physiological intracytoplasmic sperm injection (PICSI) is a variation of ICSI that uses hyaluronic acid binding to select mature sperm with better DNA integrity. Since only mature sperm bind to hyaluronic acid, PICSI may help reduce the risk of chromosomal abnormalities and improve fertilisation and pregnancy outcomes.

Magnetic-activated cell sorting (MACS) is a sperm selection technique used in assisted reproductive technologies to remove apoptotic sperm with compromised DNA integrity. The method involves using magnetic microbeads coated with annexin V, a protein that binds to phosphatidylserine — an early marker of apoptosis. When passed through a magnetic field, sperm bound to the beads are retained, allowing only viable, non-apoptotic sperm to be collected for fertilisation. MACS is often combined with conventional sperm preparation methods and is used in cases of recurrent miscarriage, male factor infertility, or high DNA fragmentation levels.

Microfluidic sperm sorting devices are designed to isolate highly motile, morphologically normal, and DNA-intact sperm. They are intended to improve ICSI and IVF outcomes by reducing the risk of injecting sperm with high DNA fragmentation into the oocyte.

These technologies aim to improve fertilisation rates, embryo quality, and overall IVF success by enhancing gamete selection at the cellular level.

=== Other expansions ===
- Additional methods of embryo profiling. For example, methods are emerging in making comprehensive analyses of up to entire genomes, transcriptomes, proteomes, and metabolomes, which may be used to score embryos by comparing the patterns with those that have previously been found among embryos in successful versus unsuccessful pregnancies.
- Assisted zona hatching (AZH) can be performed shortly before the embryo is transferred to the uterus. A small opening is made in the outer layer surrounding the egg to help the embryo hatch out and aid in the implantation process of the growing embryo.
- In egg donation and embryo donation, the resultant embryo after fertilisation is inserted into another person other than the one providing the eggs. These are resources for those with no eggs due to surgery, chemotherapy, or genetic causes; or with poor egg quality, previously unsuccessful IVF cycles, or advanced maternal age. In the egg donor process, eggs are retrieved from a donor's ovaries, fertilised in the laboratory with sperm, and the resulting healthy embryos are returned to the recipient's uterus.
- In oocyte selection, the oocytes with optimal chances of live birth can be chosen. It can also be used as a means of preimplantation genetic screening.
- Embryo splitting can be used for twinning to increase the number of available embryos.
- Cytoplasmic transfer is where the cytoplasm from a donor egg is injected into an egg with compromised mitochondria. The resulting egg is then fertilised with sperm and introduced into a uterus, usually that of the person who provided the recipient egg and nuclear DNA. Cytoplasmic transfer was created to aid those who experience infertility due to deficient or damaged mitochondria, contained within an egg's cytoplasm.

== Complications and health effects ==
=== Multiple births ===
The major complication of IVF is the risk of multiple births. This is directly related to the practice of transferring multiple embryos during embryo transfer. Multiple births are related to increased risk of pregnancy loss, obstetrical complications, prematurity, and neonatal morbidity with the potential for long-term damage. Strict limits on the number of embryos that may be transferred have been enacted in some countries (e.g. Britain, Belgium) to reduce the risk of high-order multiples (triplets or more), but are not universally followed or accepted. Spontaneous splitting of embryos in the uterus after transfer can occur, but this is rare and would lead to identical twins. A double-blind, randomised study followed IVF pregnancies that resulted in 73 infants, and reported that 8.7% of singleton infants and 54.2% of twins had a birth weight of less than 2,500 grams (5.5 lb). There is some evidence that making a double embryo transfer during one cycle achieves a higher live birth rate than a single embryo transfer; but making two single embryo transfers in two cycles has the same live birth rate and would avoid multiple pregnancies.

=== Sex ratio distortions ===
Certain kinds of IVF have been shown to lead to distortions in the sex ratio at birth. Intracytoplasmic sperm injection (ICSI), which was first applied in 1991, leads to slightly more female births (51.3% female). Blastocyst transfer, which was first applied in 1984, leads to significantly more male births (56.1% male). Standard IVF done at the second or third day leads to a normal sex ratio.

Epigenetic modifications caused by extended culture leading to the death of more female embryos has been theorised as the reason why blastocyst transfer leads to a higher male sex ratio; however, adding retinoic acid to the culture can bring this ratio back to normal. A second theory is that the male-biased sex ratio may be due to a higher rate of selection of male embryos. Male embryos develop faster in vitro, and thus may appear more viable for transfer.

=== Spread of infectious disease ===
By sperm washing, the risk that a chronic disease in the individual providing the sperm would infect the birthing parent or offspring can be brought to negligible levels.

If the sperm donor has hepatitis B, the Practice Committee of the American Society for Reproductive Medicine advises that sperm washing is not necessary in IVF to prevent transmission, unless the birthing partner has not been effectively vaccinated. In women with hepatitis B, the risk of vertical transmission during IVF is no different from the risk in spontaneous conception. However, there is not enough evidence to say that ICSI procedures are safe in women with hepatitis B regarding vertical transmission to the offspring.

Regarding the potential spread of HIV/AIDS, Japan's government prohibited the use of IVF procedures in which both partners are infected with HIV. Even though the ethics committees previously allowed the Ogikubo, Tokyo Hospital, located in Tokyo, to use IVF for couples with HIV, the Ministry of Health, Labour and Welfare of Japan decided to block the practice. Hideji Hanabusa, the vice president of the Ogikubo Hospital, states that together with his colleagues, he developed a method for scientists to remove HIV from sperm.

In the United States, people seeking to be an embryo recipient undergo infectious disease screening required by the Food and Drug Administration (FDA), and reproductive tests to determine the best placement location and cycle timing before the actual embryo transfer occurs. The amount of screening the embryo has already undergone is largely dependent on the genetic parents' IVF clinic and process. The embryo recipient may elect to have their own embryologist conduct further testing.

=== Other risks to the egg provider/retriever ===
A risk of ovarian stimulation is the development of ovarian hyperstimulation syndrome, particularly if hCG is used for inducing final oocyte maturation. This results in swollen, painful ovaries. It occurs in 30% of patients. Mild cases can be treated with over-the-counter medications, and cases can be resolved in the absence of pregnancy. In moderate cases, the ovaries swell, and fluid accumulates in the abdominal cavity, and may have symptoms of heartburn, gas, nausea, or loss of appetite. In severe cases, patients have sudden abdominal pain, nausea, vomiting, and may require hospitalisation.

During egg retrieval, there exists a small chance of bleeding, infection, and damage to surrounding structures such as bowel and bladder (transvaginal ultrasound aspiration), as well as difficulty in breathing, chest infection, allergic reactions to medication, or nerve damage (laparoscopy).

Ectopic pregnancy may also occur if a fertilised egg develops outside the uterus, usually in the fallopian tubes, and requires immediate destruction of the foetus.

IVF does not seem to be associated with an elevated risk of cervical cancer, nor with ovarian cancer or endometrial cancer when neutralising the confounder of infertility itself. Nor does it seem to impart any increased risk for breast cancer.

Regardless of pregnancy result, IVF treatment is usually stressful for patients. Neuroticism and the use of escapist coping strategies are associated with a higher degree of distress, while the presence of social support has a relieving effect. A negative pregnancy test after IVF is associated with an increased risk for depression, but not with any increased risk of developing anxiety disorders. Pregnancy test results do not seem to be a risk factor for depression or anxiety among men in the case of relationships between two cisgender, heterosexual people. Hormonal agents such as gonadotropin-releasing hormone agonist (GnRH agonist) are associated with depression.

Studies show that there is an increased risk of venous thrombosis or pulmonary embolism during the first trimester of IVF. When looking at long-term studies comparing patients who received or did not receive IVF, there seems to be no correlation with increased risk of cardiac events. There are more ongoing studies to solidify this.

Spontaneous pregnancy has occurred after successful and unsuccessful IVF treatments. Within 2 years of delivering an infant conceived through IVF, subfertile patients had a conception rate of 18%.

=== Birth defects ===
A review in 2013 came to the result that infants resulting from IVF (with or without ICSI) have a relative risk of birth defects of 1.32 (95% confidence interval 1.24–1.42) compared to naturally conceived infants. In 2008, an analysis of the data of the National Birth Defects Study in the US found that certain birth defects were significantly more common in infants conceived through IVF, notably septal heart defects, cleft lip with or without cleft palate, esophageal atresia, and anorectal atresia; the mechanism of causality is unclear. However, in a population-wide cohort study of 308,974 births (with 6,163 using assisted reproductive technology and following children from birth to age five) researchers found: "The increased risk of birth defects associated with IVF was no longer significant after adjustment for parental factors." Parental factors included known independent risks for birth defects such as maternal age, smoking status, etc. Multivariate correction did not remove the significance of the association of birth defects and ICSI (corrected odds ratio 1.57), although the authors speculate that underlying male infertility factors (which would be associated with the use of ICSI) may contribute to this observation and were not able to correct for these confounders. The authors also found that a history of infertility elevated risk itself in the absence of any treatment (odds ratio 1.29), consistent with a Danish national registry study and "implicates patient factors in this increased risk." The authors of the Danish national registry study speculate: "our results suggest that the reported increased prevalence of congenital malformations seen in singletons born after assisted reproductive technology is partly due to the underlying infertility or its determinants."

Risk in singleton pregnancies resulting from IVF (with or without ICSI)
| Condition | Relative risk | 95% confidence interval |
|---|---|---|
| Beckwith–Wiedemann syndrome | 3-4 | |
| congenital anomalies | 1.67 | 1.33–2.09 |
| ante-partum haemorrhage | 2.49 | 2.30–2.69 |
| hypertensive disorders of pregnancy | 1.49 | 1.39–1.59 |
| preterm rupture of membranes | 1.16 | 1.07–1.26 |
| Caesarean section | 1.56 | 1.51–1.60 |
| gestational diabetes | 1.48 | 1.33–1.66 |
| induction of labour | 1.18 | 1.10–1.28 |
| small for gestational age | 1.39 | 1.27–1.53 |
| preterm birth | 1.54 | 1.47–1.62 |
| low birthweight | 1.65 | 1.56–1.75 |
| perinatal mortality | 1.87 | 1.48–2.37 |

=== Other risks to the offspring ===
If the underlying infertility is related to abnormalities in spermatogenesis, male offspring will have a higher risk for sperm abnormalities. In some cases genetic testing may be recommended to help assess the risk of transmission of defects to progeny and to consider whether treatment is desirable.

IVF does not seem to confer any risks regarding cognitive development, school performance, social functioning, and behaviour. Also, IVF infants are known to be as securely attached to their parents as those who were naturally conceived, and IVF adolescents are as well-adjusted as those who have been naturally conceived.

Limited long-term follow-up data suggest that IVF may be associated with an increased incidence of hypertension, impaired fasting glucose, increase in total body fat composition, advancement of bone age, subclinical thyroid disorder, early adulthood clinical depression and binge drinking in the offspring. It is not known, however, whether these potential associations are caused by the IVF procedure in itself, by adverse obstetric outcomes associated with IVF, by the genetic origin of the children or by yet unknown IVF-associated causes. Increases in embryo manipulation during IVF result in more deviant fetal growth curves, but birth weight does not seem to be a reliable marker of fetal stress.

IVF, including ICSI, is associated with an increased risk of imprinting disorders (including Prader–Willi syndrome and Angelman syndrome), with an odds ratio of 3.7 (95% confidence interval 1.4 to 9.7).

An IVF-associated incidence of cerebral palsy and neurodevelopmental delay are believed to be related to the confounders of prematurity and low birthweight. Similarly, an IVF-associated incidence of autism and attention-deficit disorder are believed to be related to confounders of maternal and obstetric factors.

Overall, IVF does not cause an increased risk of childhood cancer. Studies have shown a decrease in the risk of certain cancers and an increased risks of certain others including retinoblastoma, hepatoblastoma and rhabdomyosarcoma.

== Controversial cases ==
=== Mix-ups ===
In some cases, laboratory mix-ups (misidentified gametes, transfer of wrong embryos) have occurred, leading to legal action against the IVF provider and complex paternity suits. An example is the case of a woman in California who received the embryo of another couple and was notified of this mistake after the birth of her son. This has led to many authorities and individual clinics implementing procedures to minimise the risk of such mix-ups. To mitigate risks and errors that could impact patients in IVF laboratories, regulatory authorities, along with institutions that assess hazards and ensure the appropriate handling of vulnerable materials such as oocytes and generic materials, were employed in the United Kingdom. This conversation sparked amid governmental concerns regarding the ethical implications of treating infertility in a laboratory setting, where doctors had all of the medical responsibility, along with philosophers such as Mary Warnock voicing their opinions on bridging medicine and politics to optimise safety. In the late 1970s, medical debates challenged the morality of IVF through religious, medical, and scientific claims, which led to the establishment of the Warnock Committee, chaired by Mary Warnock. The committee outsourced ethical decisions to groups outside of doctors, which ultimately led to the issuing of the Warnock Report, which served to regulate IVF and embryo research. In 1990, the UK passed the Human Fertilization and Embryology Act, institutionalising bioethics as a result. Because of these debates, ethics is handled by experts. The HFEA, for example, requires clinics to use a double witnessing system; the identity of specimens is checked by two people at each point at which specimens are transferred. Alternatively, technological solutions are gaining favour to reduce the manpower cost of manual double witnessing, and to further reduce risks with uniquely numbered RFID tags, which can be identified by readers connected to a computer. The computer tracks specimens throughout the process and alerts the embryologist if non-matching specimens are identified. Although the use of RFID tracking has expanded in the US, it is still not widely adopted. The HFEA, for example, requires clinics to use a double witnessing system; the identity of specimens is checked by two people at each point at which specimens are transferred. Alternatively, technological solutions are gaining favour, to reduce the manpower cost of manual double witnessing and to further reduce risks with uniquely numbered RFID tags which can be identified by readers connected to a computer. The computer tracks specimens throughout the process and alerts the embryologist if non-matching specimens are identified. Although the use of RFID tracking has expanded in the US, it is still not widely adopted.

=== Preimplantation genetic diagnosis or screening ===
Pre-implantation genetic diagnosis (PGD) is criticised for giving select demographic groups disproportionate access to a means of creating a child possessing characteristics that they consider "ideal". Many fertile couples now demand equal access to embryonic screening so that their child can be just as healthy as one created through IVF. Mass use of PGD, especially as a means of population control or in the presence of legal measures related to population or demographic control, can lead to intentional or unintentional demographic effects such as the skewed live-birth sex ratios seen in China following implementation of its one-child policy.

While PGD was originally designed to screen for embryos carrying hereditary genetic diseases, the method has been applied to select features that are unrelated to diseases, thus raising ethical questions. Examples of such cases include the selection of embryos based on histocompatibility (HLA) for the donation of tissues to a sick family member, the diagnosis of genetic susceptibility to disease, and sex selection.

These examples raise ethical issues because of the morality of eugenics. It becomes frowned upon because of the advantage of being able to eliminate unwanted traits and select desired traits. By using PGD, individuals can create a human life unethically and rely on science and not on natural selection.

For example, a deaf British couple, Tom and Paula Lichy, have petitioned to create a deaf baby using IVF. Some medical ethicists have been very critical of this approach. Jacob M. Appel wrote that "intentionally culling out blind or deaf embryos might prevent considerable future suffering, while a policy that allowed deaf or blind parents to select for such traits intentionally would be far more troublesome."

=== Industry corruption ===
Robert Winston, professor of fertility studies at Imperial College London, had called the industry "corrupt" and "greedy" stating that "one of the major problems facing us in healthcare is that IVF has become a massive commercial industry," and that "what has happened, of course, is that money is corrupting this whole technology", and accused authorities of failing to protect couples from exploitation: "The regulatory authority has done a consistently bad job. It's not prevented the exploitation of people, it's not put out very good information to couples, it's not limited the number of unscientific treatments people have access to". The IVF industry has been described as a market-driven construction of health, medicine and the human body.

The industry has been accused of making unscientific claims and distorting facts relating to infertility, in particular through widely exaggerated claims about how common infertility is in society, in an attempt to get as many couples as possible and as soon as possible to try treatments (rather than trying to conceive naturally for a longer time). This risks removing infertility from its social context and reducing the experience to a simple biological malfunction, which not only can be treated through bio-medical procedures, but should be treated by them.

=== Older patients ===
All pregnancies can be risky, but there is a greater risk for mothers who are older and are over the age of 40. As people get older, they are more likely to develop conditions such as gestational diabetes and pre-eclampsia. If the mother does conceive over the age of 40, their offspring may be of lower birth weight and more likely to require intensive care. Because of this, the increased risk is a sufficient cause for concern. The high incidence of caesarean in older patients is commonly regarded as a risk.

Those conceiving at 40 have a greater risk of gestational hypertension and premature birth. The offspring is at risk when being born from older mothers, and the risks associated with being conceived through IVF.

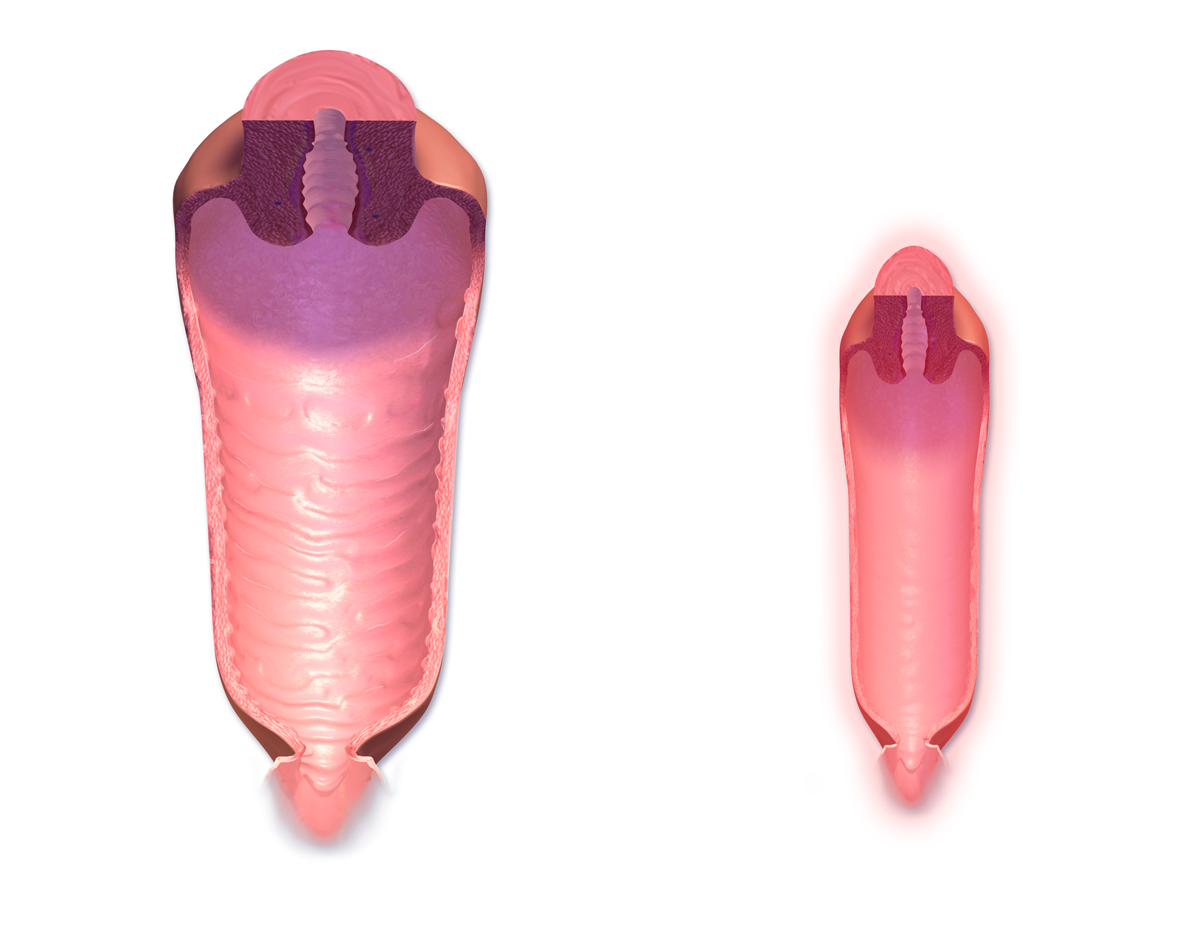
premenopausal vaginal canal vs menopausal vaginal canal

Adriana Iliescu held the record for a while as the oldest woman to give birth using IVF and a donor egg, when she gave birth in 2004 at the age of 66. In September 2019, a 74-year-old woman became the oldest-ever to give birth after she delivered twins at a hospital in Guntur, Andhra Pradesh.

==== Pregnancy after menopause ====
Although menopause is a natural barrier to further conception, IVF has allowed people to become pregnant in their fifties and sixties. People whose uteruses have been appropriately prepared receive embryos that originated from an egg donor. Therefore, although they do not have a genetic link with the child, they have a physical link through pregnancy and childbirth. Even after menopause, the uterus is fully capable of carrying out a pregnancy.

=== Same-sex couples, single and unmarried parents ===
A 2009 statement from the ASRM found no persuasive evidence that children are harmed or disadvantaged solely by being raised by single parents, unmarried parents, or homosexual parents. It did not support restricting access to assisted reproductive technologies based on a prospective parent's marital status or sexual orientation. A 2018 study found that children's psychological well-being did not differ when raised by either same-sex parents or heterosexual parents, even finding that psychological well-being was better amongst children raised by same-sex parents.

Ethical concerns include reproductive rights, the welfare of offspring, nondiscrimination against unmarried individuals, homosexuals, and professional autonomy.

A controversy in California focused on the question of whether physicians opposed to same-sex relationships should be required to perform IVF for a lesbian couple. Guadalupe T. Benitez, a lesbian medical assistant from San Diego, sued doctors Christine Brody and Douglas Fenton of the North Coast Woman's Care Medical Group after Brody told her that she had "religious-based objections to treating her and homosexuals in general to help them conceive children by artificial insemination," and Fenton refused to authorise a refill of her prescription for the fertility drug Clomid on the same grounds. The California Medical Association had initially sided with Brody and Fenton, but the case, North Coast Women's Care Medical Group v. Superior Court, was decided unanimously by the California State Supreme Court in favour of Benitez on 19 August 2008.

Nadya Suleman came to international attention after having twelve embryos implanted, eight of which survived, resulting in eight newborns being added to her existing six-child family. The Medical Board of California sought to have fertility doctor Michael Kamrava, who treated Suleman, stripped of his license. State officials allege that performing Suleman's procedure is evidence of unreasonable judgment, substandard care, and a lack of concern for the eight children she would conceive and the six she was already struggling to raise. On 1 June 2011, the Medical Board issued a ruling that Kamrava's medical licence be revoked effective 1 July 2011.

=== Transgender parents ===
The research on transgender reproduction and family planning is limited. A 2020 comparative study of children born to a transgender father and cisgender mother via donor sperm insemination in France showed no significant differences to IVF and naturally conceived children of cisgender parents.

Transgender men can experience challenges in pregnancy and birthing from the cis-normative structure within the medical system, as well as psychological challenges such as renewed gender dysphoria. The effect of continued testosterone therapy during pregnancy and breastfeeding is undetermined. Ethical concerns include reproductive rights, reproductive justice, physician autonomy, and transphobia within the health care setting.

=== Anonymous donors ===
Alana Stewart, who was conceived using donor sperm, began an online forum for donor children called AnonymousUS in 2010. The forum welcomes the viewpoints of anyone involved in the IVF process. In May 2012, a court ruled that making anonymous sperm and egg donation in British Columbia illegal.

In the UK, Sweden, Norway, Germany, Italy, New Zealand, and some Australian states, donors are not paid and cannot be anonymous.

In 2000, a website called Donor Sibling Registry was created to help biological children with a common donor connect with each other.

=== Leftover embryos or eggs, unwanted embryos ===
There may be leftover embryos or eggs from IVF procedures if the person for whom they were created has successfully carried one or more pregnancies to term, and no longer wishes to use them. With the patient's permission, these may be donated to help others conceive by means of third-party reproduction.

In embryo donation, these extra embryos are given to others for transfer, to produce a successful pregnancy. Embryo recipients have genetic issues or poor-quality embryos or eggs of their own. In many countries, the resulting child is considered the child of whoever birthed them, and not the child of the donor, the same as occurs with egg donation or sperm donation. As per the National Infertility Association, typically, genetic parents donate eggs or embryos to a fertility clinic where they are preserved by oocyte cryopreservation or embryo cryopreservation until a carrier is found for them. The agency conducts the matching process and the donation with the prospective parents, at which time the clinic transfers ownership of the embryos to the prospective parent(s).

Alternatives to donating unused embryos are destroying them (or having them transferred at a time when pregnancy is very unlikely), keeping them frozen indefinitely, or donating them for use in research (rendering them non-viable). Individual moral views on disposing of leftover embryos may depend on personal views on the beginning of human personhood and the definition and/or value of potential future persons, and on the value that is given to fundamental research questions. Some people believe donation of leftover embryos for research is a good alternative to discarding the embryos when patients receive proper, honest, and clear information about the research project, the procedures, and the scientific values.

During the embryo selection and transfer phases, many embryos may be discarded in favour of others. This selection may be based on criteria such as genetic disorders or sex. One of the earliest cases of special gene selection through IVF was the case of the Collins family in the 1990s, who selected the sex of their child.

The ethical issues remain unresolved as no worldwide consensus exists in science, religion, and philosophy on when a human embryo should be recognised as a person. For those who believe that this is at the moment of conception, IVF becomes a moral question when multiple eggs are fertilised, begin development, and only a few are chosen for the uterus transfer. If IVF were to involve the fertilisation of only a single egg, or at least only the number that will be transferred, then this would not be an issue. However, this could increase costs dramatically as only a few eggs can be attempted at a time. As a result, the couple must decide what to do with these extra embryos. Depending on their view of the embryo's humanity or the chance that the couple will want to try to have another child, the couple has multiple options for dealing with these extra embryos. Couples can choose to keep them frozen, donate them to other infertile couples, thaw them, or donate them to medical research. Keeping them frozen costs money, donating them does not ensure they will survive, thawing them renders them immediately unviable, and medical research results in their termination. In the realm of medical research, the couple is not necessarily told what the embryos will be used for, and as a result, some can be used in stem cell research.

In February 2024, the Alabama Supreme Court ruled in LePage v. Center for Reproductive Medicine that cryopreserved embryos were "persons" or "extrauterine children". After Dobbs v. Jackson Women's Health Organization (2022), some antiabortionists had hoped to get a judgment that fetuses and embryos were "person[s]".

=== Gender selection ===
Gender selection, also known as sex selection, in the context of IVF involves the use of preimplantation genetic testing (PGT) to determine the sex of embryos before transfer into the uterus, allowing prospective parents to choose embryos of a preferred sex. This is typically achieved by means of a biopsy of cells from embryos at the blastocyst stage and analysing them for sex chromosomes (XX for female, XY for male), alongside screening for genetic abnormalities. The primary aim of IVF remains assisting those with fertility issues to achieve pregnancy. Gender selection adds an elective dimension for reasons such as family balancing – where parents with children of one sex seek the opposite – or medical purposes, like avoiding sex-linked disorders such as haemophilia or Duchenne muscular dystrophy that predominantly affect males.

The process integrates with standard IVF protocols: ovarian stimulation to produce multiple eggs, retrieval, fertilisation in the lab, embryo culture to day five, biopsy for PGT (which identifies gender via chromosomal analysis), and transfer of selected embryos. PGT can also screen for conditions like Down syndrome, cystic fibrosis or Tay–Sachs disease, enhancing the medical utility of the procedure. Success rates for accurate gender determination approach 100%, though overall pregnancy success varies by factors like maternal age, with rates around 40-50% for women under 35. Costs typically add $3,000-$5,000 for PGT to a base IVF cycle of $10,000-$15,000, totalling over $20,000, though variations depend on location and clinic.

Non-medical gender selection remains controversial, with ethical concerns including potential reinforcement of gender stereotypes, societal imbalances (as seen in regions preferring sons), and the commodification of children. Legally, it is prohibited for elective reasons in countries like Canada, the UK, Australia, and much of Europe, permitted only for medical indications to prevent genetic diseases. In the United States, it is legal without federal restrictions, though guided by ethical guidelines from bodies like the American Society for Reproductive Medicine, which allows clinics discretion. Destinations like Mexico and Cyprus permit both medical and non-medical selection, attracting fertility tourism. These disparities raise questions about equity, autonomy, and cross-border ethical standards in reproductive medicine.

=== Religious response ===
==== Christianity ====
The Catholic Church opposes all kinds of assisted reproductive technology and artificial contraception, because they separate the procreative goal of marital sex from the goal of uniting married couples. The Catholic Church permits the use of a small number of reproductive technologies and contraceptive methods, such as natural family planning, which involves charting ovulation times. It allows other forms of reproductive technologies that allow conception to take place from normative sexual intercourse, such as a fertility lubricant. Pope Benedict XVI had publicly re-emphasised the Catholic Church's opposition to in vitro fertilisation, saying that it replaces love between a husband and wife. The Catechism of the Catholic Church, in accordance with the Catholic understanding of natural law, teaches that reproduction has an "inseparable connection" to the sexual union of married couples. In addition, the church opposes IVF because it might result in the disposal of embryos; in Catholicism, an embryo is viewed as an individual with a soul that must be treated as a person. The Catholic Church maintains that it is not objectively evil to be infertile, and advocates adoption as an option for such couples who still wish to have children.

The Lutheran Council in the United States of America, organised by the Lutheran Church–Missouri Synod and parent bodies of the Evangelical Lutheran Church in America, produced an authoritative document on the issue of in-vitro fertilisation, which "unanimously concluded that IVF does not in and of itself violate the will of God as reflected in the Bible, when the wife's egg and husband's sperm are used" (LCUSA n.d.:31). The Lutheran Churches approve of artificial insemination by a husband (AIH), though representatives from the Lutheran Church-Missouri Synod hold that such IVF is only unobjectionable if the sperm and egg come from husband and wife and all of the fertilised eggs are implanted in the womb of the wife. With regard to artificial insemination by a donor (AID), the Evangelical Lutheran Church in America teaches that it is a "cause for moral concern", while the Lutheran Church–Missouri Synod rejects it.

==== Islam ====
Regarding the response to IVF by Islam, a consensus from the contemporary Sunni scholars concludes that IVF methods are immoral and prohibited (some Shi'a and Sunni ones completely allow it). However, Gad El-Hak Ali Gad El-Hak's ART fatwa includes that:

- IVF of an egg from the wife with the sperm of her husband and the transfer of the fertilised egg back to the uterus of the wife is allowed, provided that the procedure is indicated for a medical reason and is carried out by an expert physician.
- Since marriage is a contract between the wife and husband during the span of their marriage, no third party should intrude into the marital functions of sex and procreation. This means that a third-party donor is not acceptable, whether he or she is providing sperm, eggs, embryos, or a uterus. The use of a third party is tantamount to zina, or adultery.

==== Judaism ====
Within the Orthodox Jewish community, the concept is debated as there is little precedent in traditional Jewish legal texts. Regarding laws of sexuality, religious challenges include masturbation (which may be regarded as "seed wasting"), laws related to sexual activity and menstruation (niddah), and the specific laws regarding intercourse. An additional major issue is that of establishing paternity and lineage. For a baby conceived naturally, the father's identity is determined by a legal presumption (chazakah) of legitimacy: rov bi'ot achar ha'baal – a woman's sexual relations are assumed to be with her husband. Regarding an IVF child, this assumption does not exist, and as such, Rabbi Eliezer Waldenberg (among others) requires an outside supervisor to identify the father positively. Reform Judaism has generally approved IVF.

=== Society and culture ===
Many women of sub-Saharan Africa choose to foster their children to infertile women. IVF enables these infertile women to have their own children, which imposes new ideals on a culture in which fostering children is seen as both natural and culturally important. Many infertile women can earn more respect in their society by taking care of the children of other mothers, and this may be lost if they choose to use IVF instead. As IVF is seen as unnatural, it may even hinder their societal position as opposed to making them equal with fertile women. It is also economically advantageous for infertile women to raise foster children, as it gives these children a greater ability to access resources that are important for their development and also aids the development of their society at large. If IVF becomes more popular without the birth rate decreasing, there could be more large family homes with fewer options to send their newborn children. This could increase the number of orphaned children and/or reduce resources for the children of large families. This would ultimately stifle the children's and the community's growth.

In the US, the pineapple has emerged as a symbol of IVF users, possibly because some people thought, without scientific evidence, that eating pineapple might slightly increase the success rate for the procedure.

== Emotional involvement with children ==
Studies have indicated that IVF mothers show greater emotional involvement with their child, and they enjoy motherhood more than mothers by natural conception. Similarly, studies have indicated that IVF fathers express more warmth and emotional involvement than fathers by adoption and natural conception, and enjoy fatherhood more. Some IVF parents become overly involved with their children.

== Men and IVF ==
Research has shown that men largely view themselves as "passive contributors", since they have "less physical involvement" in IVF treatment. Despite this, many men feel distressed after seeing the toll of hormonal injections and ongoing physical intervention on their female partner. Fertility was found to be a significant factor in a man's perception of his masculinity, driving many to keep the treatment a secret. In cases where a man shared that he and his partner were undergoing IVF, they reported having been teased, mainly by other men, although some viewed this as an affirmation of support and friendship. For others, this led to feeling socially isolated. In comparison with females, males showed less deterioration in mental health in the years following a failed treatment. However, many men did feel guilt, disappointment, and inadequacy, stating that they were simply trying to provide an "emotional rock" for their partners.

The onset of mental health problems that some men experience during and after IVF treatment has various causes and negative influences. These include religious and cultural pressures, which can cause stress and mental health strains. Interviews with Polish men who were undergoing or had undergone IVF treatment found that many men held strong feelings about previous public discourse. Maria Reimann argues that these showcases of strong emotions could be one of the limited outlets for long-held suppressed emotions. Engagement in public discourse may also act as a 'battleground', with acts that showcase anger and hate being a means for men to fight for their partner, which could act as a reassurance of common notions of masculinity. The common notions of masculinity influence the tendency to react with hate or anger. Many men hold the perception that their role is for emotional stability, often leading to the concealment of emotional suffering and stress. When men experience instability in IVF treatment from continued failures or setbacks, the reaction is commonly further isolation, with men often pursuing distractions in work or other activities, often ones that grant feelings of control. As seen in Polish men's experience with IVF, the lack of proper social support and a significant social stigma around IVF treatment contribute to a growing mental health issue.

=== Ability to withdraw consent ===
In certain countries, including Austria, Italy, Estonia, Hungary, Spain, and Israel, the man does not have full rights to withdraw consent to the storage or use of embryos once they are fertilised. In the United States, the matter has been left to the courts on a more or less ad hoc basis. If embryos are implanted and a child is born contrary to the wishes of the man, he still has the legal and financial responsibilities of a father.

== Availability and utilisation ==
=== Cost ===
IVF costs can be divided into direct and indirect costs. Direct costs include medical treatments themselves, including doctor consultations, medications, ultrasound scans, laboratory tests, the actual IVF procedure, and associated hospital charges and administrative costs. Indirect costs include the cost of addressing complications, compensation for the gestational surrogate, patient travel, and lost productivity. These costs can be exaggerated by higher age in the woman undergoing IVF treatment (particularly those over the age of 40), and the increased costs associated with multiple births. For instance, a pregnancy with twins can cost up to three times that of a singleton pregnancy. While some insurances cover one cycle of IVF, it takes multiple cycles of IVF to have a successful outcome. A study completed in Northern California reveals that the IVF procedure alone that results in a successful outcome costs $61,377, and this can be more costly with the use of a donor egg.

The cost of IVF reflects the costliness of the underlying healthcare system rather than the regulatory or funding environment, and ranges, on average for a standard IVF cycle and in 2006 United States dollars, between $12,500 in the United States and $4,000 in Japan. In Ireland, IVF costs around €4,000, with fertility drugs, if required, costing up to €3,000. The cost per live birth is highest in the United States ($41,000) and United Kingdom ($40,000) and lowest in Scandinavia and Japan (both around $24,500).

The high cost of IVF is also a barrier to access for disabled individuals, who typically have lower incomes, face higher health care costs, and seek health care services more often than non-disabled individuals.

Navigating insurance coverage for transgender expectant parents presents a unique challenge. Insurance plans are designed to cater towards a specific population, meaning that some plans can provide adequate coverage for gender-affirming care but fail to provide fertility services for transgender patients. Additionally, insurance coverage is constructed around a person's legally recognised sex and not their anatomy; thus, transgender people may not get coverage for the services they need, including transgender men for fertility services.

=== Use by LGBT individuals ===
==== Same-sex couples ====
In larger urban centres, studies have found that lesbian, gay, bisexual, transgender, and queer (LGBTQ+) populations are among the fastest-growing users of fertility care. IVF is increasingly being used to allow lesbian and other LGBT couples to share in the reproductive process through a technique called reciprocal IVF. The eggs of one partner are used to create embryos which the other partner carries through pregnancy. For gay male couples, many elect to use IVF through gestational surrogacy, where one partner's sperm is used to fertilise a donor ovum, and the resulting embryo is transplanted into a surrogate carrier's womb. There are IVF options available for same-sex couples including, but not limited to, IVF with donor sperm, IVF with a partner's oocytes, reciprocal IVF, IVF with donor eggs, and IVF with gestational surrogate. IVF with donor sperm can be considered traditional IVF for lesbian couples. Reciprocal IVF or using a partner's oocytes are other options for lesbian couples trying to conceive, to include both partners in the biological process. Using a partner's oocytes is an option for partners who are unsuccessful in conceiving with their own, and reciprocal IVF involves undergoing reproduction with a donor egg and sperm that is then transferred to a partner who will gestate. Donor IVF involves conceiving with a third party's eggs. Typically, for gay male couples hoping to use IVF, the common techniques are using IVF with donor eggs and gestational surrogates.

==== Transgender parents ====
Many LGBT communities centre their support around cisgender gay, lesbian and bisexual people and neglect to include proper support for transgender people. The same 2020 literature review analyses the social, emotional and physical experiences of pregnant transgender men. A common obstacle faced by pregnant transgender men is the possibility of gender dysphoria. Literature shows that transgender men report uncomfortable procedures and interactions during their pregnancies, as well as feeling misgendered due to gendered terminology used by healthcare providers. Outside of the healthcare system, pregnant transgender men may experience gender dysphoria due to cultural assumptions that all pregnant people are cisgender women. These people use three common approaches to navigating their pregnancy: passing as a cisgender woman, hiding their pregnancy, or being out and visibly pregnant as a transgender man. Some transgender and gender diverse patients describe their experience in seeking gynaecological and reproductive health care as isolating and discriminatory, as the strictly binary healthcare system often leads to denial of healthcare coverage or unnecessary revelation of their transgender status to their employer.

Many transgender people retain their original sex organs and choose to have children through biological reproduction. Advances in assisted reproductive technology and fertility preservation have broadened the options transgender people have to conceive a child using their own gametes or a donor's. Transgender men and women may opt for fertility preservation before any gender affirming surgery; it is not required for future biological reproduction. It is also recommended that fertility preservation is conducted before any hormone therapy. Additionally, while fertility specialists often suggest that transgender men discontinue their testosterone hormones before pregnancy, research on this topic is still inconclusive. However, a 2019 study found that transgender male patients seeking oocyte retrieval via assisted reproductive technology (including IVF) were able to undergo treatment four months after stopping testosterone treatment, on average. All patients experienced menses and normal AMH, FSH and E_{2} levels and antral follicle counts after coming off testosterone, which allowed for successful oocyte retrieval. Despite assumptions that the long-term androgen treatment negatively impacts fertility, oocyte retrieval, an integral part of the IVF process, does not appear to be affected.

Biological reproductive options available to transgender women include, but are not limited to, IVF and IUI with the trans woman's sperm and a donor's or a partner's eggs and uterus. Fertility treatment options for transgender men include, but are not limited to, IUI or IVF using his own eggs with a donor's sperm and/or donor's eggs, his uterus, or a different uterus, whether that is a partner's or a surrogate's.

=== Use by disabled individuals ===
People with disabilities who wish to have children are equally or more likely than the non-disabled population to experience infertility, yet disabled individuals are much less likely to have access to fertility treatment such as IVF. Many extraneous factors hinder disabled individuals' access to IVF, such as assumptions about decision-making capacity, sexual interests and abilities, heritability of a disability, and beliefs about parenting ability. These same misconceptions about people with disabilities that once led health care providers to sterilise thousands of women with disabilities now lead them to provide or deny reproductive care based on stereotypes concerning people with disabilities and their sexuality.

Not only do misconceptions about disabled individuals' parenting ability, sexuality, and health restrict and hinder access to fertility treatment such as IVF, but structural barriers, such as providers uneducated in disability healthcare and inaccessible clinics, severely hinder disabled individuals' access to receiving IVF.

=== By country ===
==== Australia ====
In Australia, the average age of women undergoing ART treatment is 35.5 years among those using their own eggs (one in four being 40 or older) and 40.5 years among those using donated eggs. While IVF is available in Australia, Australians using IVF are unable to choose their baby's gender.

==== Cameroon ====
Ernestine Gwet Bell supervised the first Cameroonian child born by IVF in 1998.

==== Canada ====
In Canada, one cycle of IVF treatment can cost between $7,750 and $12,250 CAD, and medications alone can cost from $2,500 to over $7,000 CAD. The funding mechanisms that influence accessibility in Canada vary by province and territory, with some provinces providing full, partial, or no coverage.

New Brunswick provides partial funding through their Infertility Special Assistance Fund – a one-time grant of up to $5,000. Patients may only claim up to 50% of treatment costs or $5,000 (whichever is less) incurred after April 2014. Eligible patients must be full-time New Brunswick residents with a valid Medicare card and have an official medical infertility diagnosis by a physician.

In December 2015, the Ontario provincial government enacted the Ontario Fertility Program for patients with medical and non-medical infertility, regardless of sexual orientation, gender, or family composition. Eligible patients for IVF treatment must be Ontario residents under the age of 43, have a valid Ontario Health Insurance Plan card, and have not already undergone any IVF cycles. Coverage is extensive, but not universal. Policymakers in Canada have historically debated over whether IVF fits the criteria for funding and ultimately decided to delist it, raising concerns and controversy over whether reproductive health is considered a medical issue worth helping patients with. Because this government delisting forced patients with infertility to pay thousands of dollars out of pocket, activists lobbied for additional funding using the policymakers' framework. This pressure led to the formation of the Expert Panel, which recommended limited funding based on the idea that IVF was a medical necessity rather than a means of accessing services. After the Ontario government implemented the Ontario Fertility Program, which funded only one cycle, advocacy groups advocated for further funding. Because the panel defined "medical necessity" relatively narrowly, arguments for extended funding have often been neutralised. These debates have future implications for how health care spending is given out based on how parameters such as efficiency, medicalisation, and immediacy are defined. Coverage extends to certain blood and urine tests, physician/nurse counselling and consultations, certain ultrasounds, up to two cycle monitorings, embryo thawing, freezing and culture, fertilisation and embryology services, single transfers of all embryos, and one surgical sperm retrieval using certain techniques only if necessary. Drugs and medications are not covered under this program, along with psychologist or social worker counselling, storage and shipping of eggs, sperm or embryos, and the purchase of donor sperm or eggs.

In October 2025, the Ontario provincial government expanded the OFP to include an additional $250 million investment as well as a fertility tax credit. The tax credit is effective as of January 2025 and covers 25% of eligible fertility-related expenses up to $20,000, providing a maximum annual credit of $5,000. The scheme is available to Ontario residents with a valid OHIP card and eligible fertility expenses paid on or after 1 January 2025, who are not being reimbursed by private insurance

==== China ====
IVF is expensive in China and not generally accessible to unmarried women. In August 2022, China's National Health Authority announced that it will take steps to make assisted reproductive technology more accessible, including by guiding local governments to include such technology in its national medical system.

==== Croatia ====
No egg or sperm donations take place in Croatia, however using donated sperm or egg in ART and IUI is allowed. With donated eggs, sperm or embryo, a heterosexual couple and single women have legal access to IVF. Male or female couples do not have access to ART as a form of reproduction. The minimum age for males and females to access ART in Croatia is 18 there is no maximum age. Donor anonymity applies, but the born child can be given access to the donor's identity at a certain age

==== India ====
The penetration of the IVF market in India is quite low, with only 2,800 cycles per million infertile people in the reproductive age group (20–44 years), as compared to China, which has 6,500 cycles. The key challenges are lack of awareness, affordability and accessibility. Since 2018, however, India has become a destination for fertility tourism, because of lower costs than in the Western world. In December 2021, the Lok Sabha passed the Assisted Reproductive Technology (Regulation) Bill 2020, to regulate ART services including IVF centres, sperm and egg banks.

==== Israel ====
Israel has the highest rate of IVF in the world, with 1,657 procedures performed per million people per year. Couples without children can receive funding for IVF for up to two children. The same funding is available for people without children who will raise up to two children in a single parent home. IVF is available for people aged 18 to 45. The Israeli Health Ministry says it spends roughly $3450 per procedure.

==== Sweden ====
One, two or three IVF treatments are government subsidised for people who are younger than 40 and have no children. The rules for how many treatments are subsidised, and the upper age limit for the people, vary between different county councils. Single people are treated, and embryo transfers (so-called "embryo adoptions") are allowed. There are also private clinics that offer the treatment for a fee.

==== United Kingdom ====
Availability of IVF in England is determined by Clinical Commissioning Groups (CCGs). The National Institute for Health and Care Excellence (NICE) recommends up to 3 cycles of treatment for people under 40 years old with minimal success conceiving after 2 years of unprotected sex. Cycles will not be continued for people who are older than 40 years. CCGs in Essex, Bedfordshire and Somerset have reduced funding to one cycle, or none, and it is expected that reductions will become more widespread. Funding may be available in "exceptional circumstances" – for example if a male partner has a transmittable infection or one partner is affected by cancer treatment. According to the campaign group Fertility Fairness "at the end of 2014 every CCG in England was funding at least one cycle of IVF". Prices paid by the NHS in England varied between under £3,000 to more than £6,000 in 2014/5. In February 2013, the cost of implementing the NICE guidelines for IVF along with other treatments for infertility was projected to be £236,000 per year per 100,000 members of the population.

IVF increasingly appears on NHS treatments blacklists. In August 2017 five of the 208 CCGs had stopped funding IVF completely and others were considering doing so. By October 2017 only 25 CCGs were delivering the three recommended NHS IVF cycles to eligible people under 40. Policies could fall foul of discrimination laws if they treat same sex couples differently from heterosexual ones. In July 2019 Jackie Doyle-Price said that women were registering with surgeries further away from their own home in order to get around CCG rationing policies.

The Human Fertilisation and Embryology Authority said in September 2018 that parents who are limited to one cycle of IVF, or have to fund it themselves, are more likely choose to implant multiple embryos in the hope it increases the chances of pregnancy. This significantly increases the chance of multiple births and the associated poor outcomes, which would increase NHS costs. The president of the Royal College of Obstetricians and Gynaecologists said that funding 3 cycles was "the most important factor in maintaining low rates of multiple pregnancies and reduce(s) associated complications".

==== United States ====
In the United States, overall availability of IVF in 2005 was 2.5 IVF physicians per 100,000 population, and utilisation was 236 IVF cycles per 100,000. 126 procedures are performed per million people per year. Utilisation highly increases with availability and IVF insurance coverage, and to a significant extent also with percentage of single persons and median income. In the US, an average cycle, from egg retrieval to embryo implantation, costs $12,400, and insurance companies that do cover treatment, even partially, usually cap the number of cycles they pay for. As of 2015, more than 1 million babies had been born utilising IVF technologies.

In the US, as of September 2023, 21 states and the District of Columbia had passed laws for fertility insurance coverage. In 15 of those jurisdictions, some level of IVF coverage is included, and in 17, some fertility preservation services are included. Coverage is required for both fertility preservation and IVF in ten states (Colorado, Connecticut, Delaware, Maryland, Maine, New Hampshire, New Jersey, New York, Rhode Island, and Utah) as well as Washington, D.C. The states that have infertility coverage laws are Arkansas, California, Colorado, Connecticut, Delaware, Hawaii, Illinois, Louisiana, Maryland, Massachusetts, Montana, New Hampshire, New Jersey, New York, Ohio, Rhode Island, Texas, Utah, and West Virginia. As of July 2023, New York was reportedly the only state Medicaid program to cover IVF. These laws differ by state but many require an egg be fertilised with sperm from a spouse and that in order to be covered you must show you cannot become pregnant through penile-vaginal sex. These requirements are not possible for a same-sex couple to meet.

Many fertility clinics in the United States limit the upper age at which people are eligible for IVF to 50 or 55 years. These cut-offs make it difficult for people older than fifty-five to utilise the procedure.

===== Racial disparities in the United States =====
Significant racial and ethnic disparities exist in both the utilisation and outcomes of in vitro fertilisation and other assisted reproductive technologies in the United States. Minority populations are less likely to access fertility care and often experience structural barriers throughout the treatment process. These barriers include reduced access to insurance coverage, difficulty receiving referrals, longer durations of infertility before seeking specialist care, and lower rates of counseling about fertility preservation, particularly prior to cancer treatment. As a result, minority patients have historically experienced slower uptake of fertility preservation technologies and lower overall live birth rates following ART.

Disparities are also evident in clinical outcomes. Studies have shown that African American, Hispanic, and Asian patients undergoing IVF experience higher rates of adverse outcomes compared to white patients. For example, among women with polycystic ovary syndrome (PCOS), African American and Asian women have significantly lower likelihoods of live birth, while African American and Hispanic women face higher risks of pregnancy loss. Additionally, neonatal mortality rates are higher among Asian, Hispanic, and African American patients who achieve live births through IVF. These findings reflect broader inequities in reproductive health outcomes across racial and ethnic groups.

Scholars emphasize that these disparities are not limited to clinical outcomes but are part of a broader pattern of inequality across the entire infertility journey. From initial access to care to treatment success, historically marginalised populations encounter systemic challenges shaped by socioeconomic inequality, structural racism, and differences in healthcare access. Using a reproductive justice framework, researchers argue that these inequities reflect not only disparities in medical treatment but also unequal conditions affecting individuals' ability to achieve and sustain parenthood.

== Legal status ==
Government agencies in China passed bans on the use of IVF in 2003 by unmarried people or by couples with certain infectious diseases.

In India, the use of IVF as a means of sex selection (preimplantation genetic diagnosis) is banned under the Pre-Conception and Pre-Natal Diagnostic Techniques Act, 1994.

Sunni Muslim nations generally allow IVF between married couples when conducted with their own respective sperm and eggs, but not with donor eggs from other couples. But Iran, which is Shi'a Muslim, has a more complex scheme. Iran bans sperm donation but allows donation of both fertilised and unfertilised eggs. Fertilised eggs are donated from married couples to other married couples, while unfertilised eggs are donated in the context of mut'ah or temporary marriage to the father. There are marjas who however, allow it without restriction and say there is no evidence of it being haram.

By 2012 Costa Rica was the only country in the world with a complete ban on IVF technology, it having been ruled unconstitutional by the nation's Supreme Court because it "violated life." Costa Rica had been the only country in the western hemisphere that forbade IVF. A law project sent reluctantly by the government of President Laura Chinchilla was rejected by parliament. President Chinchilla has not publicly stated her position on the question of IVF. However, given the massive influence of the Catholic Church in her government any change in the status quo seems very unlikely. In spite of Costa Rican government and strong religious opposition, the IVF ban has been struck down by the Inter-American Court of Human Rights in a decision of 20 December 2012. The court said that a long-standing Costa Rican guarantee of protection for every human embryo violated the reproductive freedom of infertile couples because it prohibited them from using IVF, which often involves the disposal of embryos not implanted in a woman's uterus. On 10 September 2015, President Luis Guillermo Solís signed a decree legalising in-vitro fertilisation. The decree was added to the country's official gazette on 11 September. Opponents of the practice have since filed a lawsuit before the country's Constitutional Court.

All major restrictions on single but infertile people using IVF were lifted in Australia in 2002 after a final appeal to the Australian High Court was rejected on procedural grounds in the Leesa Meldrum case. A Victorian federal court had ruled in 2000 that the existing ban on all single women and lesbians using IVF constituted sex discrimination. Victoria's government announced changes to its IVF law in 2007 eliminating remaining restrictions on fertile single women and lesbians, leaving South Australia as the only state maintaining them.

=== United States ===
Despite strong popular support (7 out of 10 adults consider IVF access a good thing and 67% believe that health insurance plans should cover IVF), IVF can involve complicated legal issues and has become a contentious issue in US politics. Federal regulations include screening requirements and restrictions on donations, but these generally do not affect heterosexually intimate partners. Doctors may be required to provide treatments to unmarried or LGBTQ couples under non-discrimination laws, as for example in California. The state of Tennessee proposed a bill in 2009 that would have defined donor IVF as adoption. During the same session, another bill proposed barring adoption from any unmarried and cohabitating couple, and activist groups stated that passing the first bill would effectively stop unmarried women from using IVF. Neither of these bills passed.

In 2023, the Practice Committee of the American Society for Reproductive Medicine (ASRM) updated its guidelines for the definition of "infertility" to include those who need medical interventions "in order to achieve a successful pregnancy either as an individual or with a partner." In many states, legal and financial decisions about provision of infertility treatments reference this "official" definition. On September 29, 2024, California Governor Gavin Newsom signed SB 729, legislation which aligns with the ASRM definition of "infertility".

In the United States, much of the opposition to the use of IVF is associated with the anti-abortion movement, evangelicals, and denominations such as the Southern Baptists. Current legal opposition to IVF and other fertility treatment access has stemmed from recent court rulings regarding women's reproductive healthcare. In the 2022 Dobbs v. Jackson Women's Health Organization decision, the U.S. Supreme Court overturned the 1973 Roe v. Wade decision which had federally protected the right to abortion. The 2024 Alabama Supreme Court decision regarding IVF has since threatened IVF access and legality in the U.S. Frozen embryos at an IVF clinic were accidentally destroyed, resulting in a lawsuit during which the attorneys for the plaintiff sought damages under the Wrongful Death of a Minor Act. The court ruled in favor of the plaintiffs, setting a state-level precedent that embryos and fetuses are given the same rights as minors/children, regardless of whether they are in utero or not. This has created confusion over the status of unused embryos and questions surrounding when life begins. After the court's decision, numerous IVF clinics in Alabama halted IVF treatment services for fears of civil and criminal liability associated with the new rights granted to embryos. Since, laws proposing embryonic personhood have been proposed in 13 other states, creating fear of further state restrictions. This ruling raised concerns from The National Infertility Association and the American Society for Reproductive Medicine that the decision would mean Alabama's bans on abortion prohibit IVF as well, while the University of Alabama at Birmingham health system paused IVF treatments. Eight days later the Alabama legislature voted to protect IVF providers and patients from criminal or civil liability.

The Right to IVF Act, federal legislation that would have codified a right to fertility treatments and provided insurance coverage for in vitro fertilisation treatments, was twice brought to a vote in the Senate in 2024. Both times it was blocked by Senate Republicans, of whom only Lisa Murkowski and Susan Collins voted to move the bill forward.

Few American courts have addressed the issue of the "property" status of a frozen embryo. This issue might arise in the context of a divorce case, in which a court would need to determine which spouse would be able to decide the disposition of the embryos. It could also arise in the context of a dispute between a sperm donor and egg donor, even if they were unmarried. In 2015, an Illinois court held that such disputes could be decided by reference to any contract between the parents-to-be. In the absence of a contract, the court would weigh the relative interests of the parties.

On February 18, 2025, President Donald Trump signed an executive order which, according to the White House website, "directs policy recommendations to protect IVF access and aggressively reduce out-of-pocket and health plan costs for such treatments". Trump has expressed support for IVF programs in the past, aiming to reduce the cost of such procedures.

== Anthropological perspectives ==
=== Overview ===
Human reproduction from an anthropological perspective is not considered as a wholly biological mechanism, as it is influenced by the surrounding culture and society. These societal beliefs control what are classified as suitable methods of human reproduction. Since its development in the 1970s, IVF has become a socially approved method of reproduction in many cultures. The acceptance of IVF technology in different societies has changed its perception from a 'stigmatised' medical tool to a new way to bring human life into the world. Its acceptance can be based on sociological and anthropological models of reproduction as these societies have changed their classification of reproduction to include this technology as a valid form of procreation, just like traditional methods of conception.

Whilst IVF allows for women facing hardship with 'natural' methods to conceive, its use extends beyond that. People may seek the technology to satisfy societal and familial pressures of repopulation, ensuring that they use everything available to them to increase the chance of conception, or even as a means to strengthen affinal or kinship relations by procreating. These external pressures are the inception of differing attitudes in cultures towards IVF technology being used on a regular basis as an aid in human reproduction.

=== Japan ===
In Japan, IVF has become a widely used form of assisted reproduction, shaped by culture, ethics and policy as the nation's birth rates decline and marriages and pregnancy occur later in life. Cultural values deeply influence the practice; embryos are not viewed simply as biological matter but rather are ingrained with social and moral meaning. Based on the interviews of 58 women in Japan who underwent IVF treatment, anthropologists suggest that the embryos' status is underexplored in Japanese public discourse due to the widespread belief that their social and emotional significance is unimportant. These interviews, however, revealed that women attribute emotional, familial and spiritual values to embryos, which largely influence the decisions around their use, storage and disposal.

The commodification of IVF is reflected in the private and unregulated nature of the fertility industry in Japan. Access to IVF is often limited by societal norms and financial means, with most treatments not being covered by health insurance, hindering access for women who are unmarried, in same-sex relationships, or with limited finances. Such practices reveal how broader social expectations, such as maintaining traditional family values and genetic lineage, can influence who can and cannot access assisted reproduction.

== Alternatives ==
Some alternatives to IVF are:

- Artificial insemination, including intracervical insemination and intrauterine insemination of semen. It requires that a woman ovulates, but is a relatively simple procedure, and can be used in the home for self-insemination without medical practitioner assistance. The beneficiaries of artificial insemination are people who desire to give birth to their own child who may be single, in a lesbian relationship, or in a heterosexual relationship where the male partner is infertile or has a physical impairment which prevents full intercourse from taking place.
- Ovulation induction (in the sense of medical treatment aiming for the development of one or two ovulatory follicles) is an alternative for people with anovulation or oligoovulation, since it is less expensive and more easy to control. It generally involves antiestrogens such as clomifene citrate or letrozole, and is followed by natural or artificial insemination.
- Surrogacy, the process in which a surrogate agrees to bear a child for another person or persons, who will become the child's parent(s) after birth. People may seek a surrogacy arrangement when pregnancy is medically impossible, when pregnancy risks are too dangerous for the intended gestational carrier, or when a single man or a male couple wish to have a child.
- Adoption whereby a person assumes the parenting of another, usually a child, from that person's biological or legal parent or parents.

== See also ==
- Semen cryopreservation
- Evans v United Kingdom, a key case at the European Court of Human Rights
- Sex selection
- Stem cell controversy
- Reciprocal IVF
- Test Tube Babies (film)
