= Embryo culture =

Embryo culture is a component of in vitro fertilisation where in resultant embryos are allowed to grow for some time in an artificial medium.

== Duration ==
The duration of embryo culture can be varied, conferring different stages of embryogenesis at embryo transfer. The main stages at which embryo transfer is performed are cleavage stage (day 2 to 4 after co-incubation) or the blastocyst stage (day 5 or 6 after co-incubation).

Embryos which reach the day 3 cell stage can be tested for chromosomal or specific genetic defects prior to possible transfer by preimplantation genetic diagnosis (PGD). Embryo culture until the blastocyst stage confers a significant increase in live birth rate per embryo transfer, and there is no evidence of a difference between the groups in cumulative pregnancy rates. Transfer day 2 instead of day 3 after fertilization has no differences in live birth rate.

Monozygotic twinning is not increased after blastocyst transfer compared with cleavage-stage embryo transfer.

There are significantly higher odds of preterm birth (odds ratio 1.3) and congenital anomalies (odds ratio 1.3) among births from embryos cultured until the blastocyst stage compared with cleavage stage.

== Characteristics of an optimal embryo culture ==
The first thing to take into account are the oxygen and carbon dioxide conditions because they must be as similar as the uterus ones as possible. It is for this reason that oxygen has to be at 5% and carbon dioxide at 6% (depending on altitude). On the other hand, temperature must be set at 37 degrees. In addition, the pH levels should be between 7.2 and 7.5.

Regarding the incubator, technicians should place one patient per incubator and avoid frequent door opening. Taking into account the number of embryos used in the culture, group embryo culture is recommended, so they can exchange growing factors while time is saved in the lab but embryo fusion is a drawback that has to be taken into account, in fact, after day five embryo fusion is more likely to happen.

== Techniques ==
Culture of embryos can either be performed in an artificial culture medium or in an autologous endometrial coculture (on top of a layer of cells from the woman's own uterine lining). With artificial culture medium, there can either be the same culture medium throughout the period (monoculture medium), or a sequential system can be used, in which the embryo is sequentially placed in different media, with different formulations based on the different concentration and composition of the tubal and uterine fluid in relation to change in the metabolic activity of the embryo during its development. For example, when culturing to the blastocyst stage, one medium may be used for culture to day 3, and a second medium is used for culture thereafter. Single or sequential medium are equally effective for the culture of human embryos to the blastocyst stage. Artificial embryo culture media basically contain glucose, pyruvate, and energy-providing components, but the addition of amino acids, nucleotides, vitamins, and cholesterol improve the performance of embryonic growth and development. Specifically, embryo culture media contain more pyruvate concentration than glucose in the cleavage phase and more glucose concentration than pyruvate in the blastocyst phase. This is because before day 3 the embryo uses the oocyte reserves, however, from day 3 to the blastocyst it starts to express different proteins to continue its development, so it starts to degrade glucose (it needs more glucose in this case). Also substances like antioxidants, antibiotics, macromolecules, hormones and growth factors can be added. Methods to permit dynamic embryo culture with fluid flow and embryo movement are also available. A new method in development uses the uterus as an incubator and the naturally occurring intrauterine fluids as culture medium by encapsulating the embryos in a permeable intrauterine vessel.

A review in 2013 meta-analysis of commercially available IVF culture media was unable to identify a specific media that was superior in terms of pregnancy outcome.

Usage of low oxygen concentrations of 5% rather than about 20% in the atmosphere has been shown to increase live birth rate to a relative probability of 1.24, without any evidence of increased risk for multiple pregnancies, miscarriages or congenital abnormalities.

=== Buffering system ===
Control and regulation of pH are mandatory for in vitro embryo culture. Culture media can be classified according to type of buffer used:

CO_{2} / bicarbonate - buffered medium: uses the same physiological buffering system surrounding mammalian cells. Require the use of CO_{2} incubators at 5-7%;

Phosphate-buffered medium: does not require CO_{2} environment. Seems to have detrimental effects in embryo development in vitro;

HEPES-buffered medium: used as buffered medium for human oocyte collection and embryo handling;

MOPS-buffered medium: like HEPES, has the potential advantage that the buffering capacity is less temperature dependent.

== Temperature ==
While it has been hypothesized that incubating at a temperature lower than 37 °C may be a more accurate recreation of the temperature in the female reproductive tract, the evidence is uncertain whether different temperatures for embryo culture have different effects on pregnancy or live birth rates.

== Risks ==
Animal studies have detected epigenetic abnormalities in embryos having undergone embryo culture, indicating a need to optimize the procedures.

== Embryo culture in non-human species ==
In addition to human embryo culture, the technique is employed extensively for non-human species, especially when exploring embryo development, assisted reproductive technology, and the generation of genetically modified animals. Mouse embryos, in particular, are frequently cultured for these specific research purposes. The two often used cultural media are potassium simplex optimized medium (KSOM) and human tubal fluid (HTF). Because KSOM uses a bicarbonate buffering mechanism, it is dependent on a CO_{2} incubator to maintain the right pH. As with KSOM, HTF is only appropriate for a CO_{2} incubator environment but is employed during the fertilisation process. Buffered by a HEPES system, M2 medium facilitates embryo handling in ambient conditions without the need for CO_{2} regulation.
