= Embryo Ranking Intelligent Classification Algorithm =

Software for in-vitro fertilisation

Embryo Ranking Intelligent Classification Algorithm (ERICA) is a deep learning AI software designed to assist embryologists and clinicians during the embryo selection process leading to embryo transfer, a critical step of in vitro fertilisation treatments (IVF).

This AI-based software relies on artificial vision to extract features not identifiable with the use of conventional microscopy. Following feature extraction, ERICA accurately ranks embryos according to their prognosis (defined as euploidy and implantation potential). In this way, ERICA removes the subjectivity inherent to previously existing classifications and, by efficiently assisting clinicians, increases the chances of selecting the one embryo with the best chances to become a baby.

ERICA's algorithms and the EmbryoRanking.com associated software are cloud-based and base their ranking system on predicting individual embryo's genetic status in a non-invasive fashion.

== See also ==
- Embryo selection
- In vitro fertilisation and embryo selection
