= Morphokinetics IVF =

Morphokinetics (from morpho, meaning "form" or "shape", and kinetics, meaning "movement") refers to time-specific morphological changes during embryo development providing dynamic information on a fertilized egg. The detailed information eases morphological selection of embryos with high implantation potential to be used during in vitro fertilisation (IVF) treatment.

== Technology ==
The traditional method for selection of embryos to be used for embryo transfer in fertility treatments such as IVF, involves assessing the morphology of a fertilized egg at crucial time points under a microscope.

The incorporation of time-lapse imaging tools in an incubator is a novel technology that allows images of embryo development to be captured frequently.

This together with softwares allows embryologists and clinicians to interpret the embryo development information captured and select embryos for transfer in IVF treatment.

Research for an algorithm to select a single embryo that would lead to the best clinical pregnancy outcome is underway.

Time-lapse incubators can be used for any patient, but they are especially indicated for:

- Patients with previous cycles of implantation failure.
- Patients with recurrent miscarriages.
- Patients with many oocytes who wish to transfer a single embryo, since it improves their selection.

== Morphology ==
Morphology of the embryo is studied in scientific research and often marked by stages.

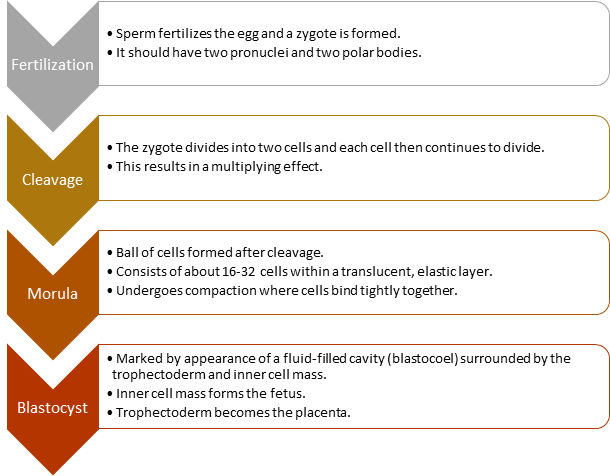
A flow chart summarizing the stages in morphology of the embryo.

For further details of the processes that occur within each stage, see Human embryogenesis.

1. Fertilization

After the egg is fertilized by the sperm, a zygote (single diploid cell) is formed. At this stage, it should have two pronuclei, one of each derived from the egg and the sperm cell respectively and two tiny cells called polar bodies.

2. Cleavage

This begins when the zygote divides into two cells via mitosis. The division continues such that each cell divides into another two cells, which results in a multiplying effect.

3. Morula

The ball of cells formed after the multiple divisions is called a morula. It consists of about 16-32 cells in a ball within a translucent, elastic layer called the zona pellucida. It will then undergo compaction which is a process where the cells bind firmly together and continue to develop into a blastocyst.

4. Blastocyst

Blastulation is marked by the appearance of a fluid-filled cavity (blastocoel) surrounded by a single layer of cells called the trophectoderm and the inner cell mass. The fetus is developed from the inner cell mass while the placenta is derived from the trophectoderm.

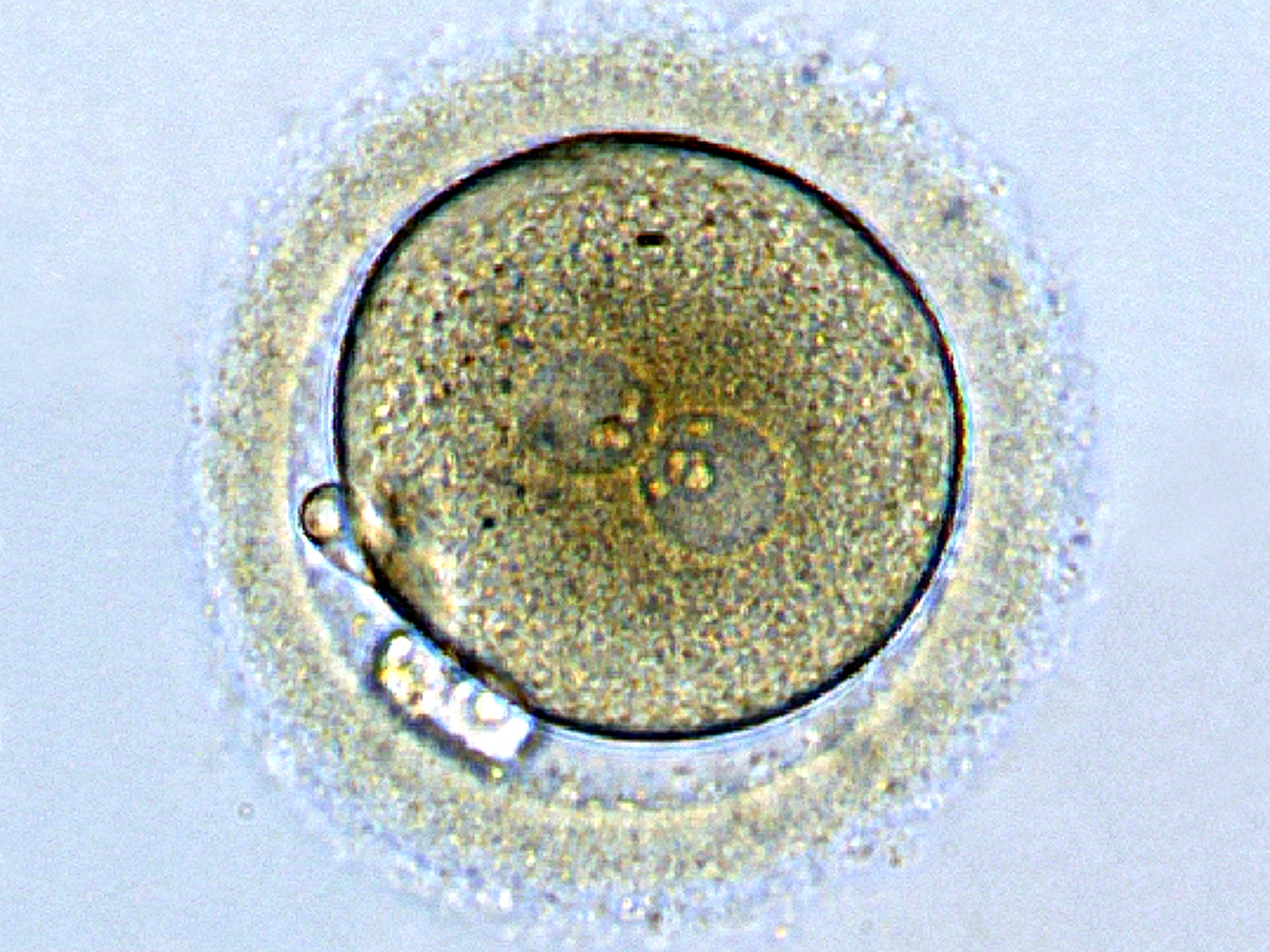
Zygote

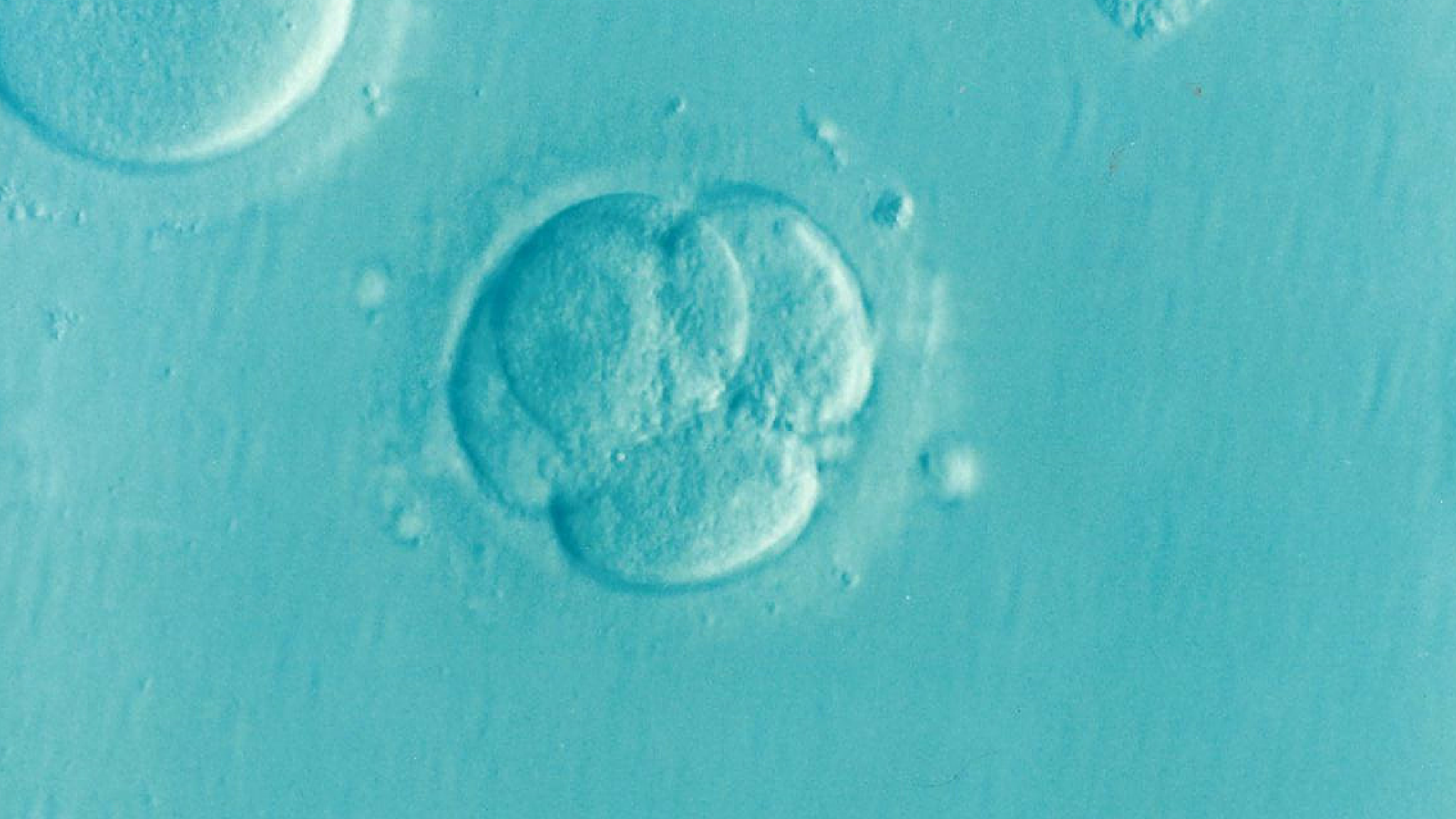
Cleavage Stage Embryo

Blastocyst

== Benefits ==
Morphokinetics has the potential advantage over standard morphological evaluation as it does not use a static form of observation to evaluate a highly dynamic process.

High resolution images obtained at frequent time points provides greater detail of the events involved in embryo development. This higher degree of detail and parameters used to assess embryo viability reduces the biased variability in embryo selection by an embryologist, allowing for a more standardised method of embryo quality evaluation and selection for implantation. This also provides a quantifiable method for analysis rather than just qualitative.

Clinicians are given more time to evaluate an image rather than a time pressured evaluation of an embryo which must be quickly put back into incubation; resulting in a reduced degree of human error.

Potential damage to otherwise viable embryos is also reduced due to minimized fluctuation of optimal culture conditions . These factors such as pH and temperature, if altered, have been shown to influence preimplantation development of a blastocyst.

Both the mother and child may benefit from this new method of IVF treatment. Transfer of the single, highest potential embryo into the mother reduces the likelihood of multiple gestations, which limits future complications such as preterm labour.

This method reduces time spent and consequently lowering overall costs.

Greater understanding and evidence for embryo morphokinetics can help improve current knowledge of embryo development and factors influencing successful clinical pregnancy outcome.

== Limitations ==
Although morphokinetics has its advantage in terms of selecting embryos for implantation, the technology is unable to deselect all abnormal embryos.

There is also a struggle to find a universal algorithm as attempts to validate published algorithms have proved unsuccessful. More work needs to be done in the scientific community, working as a cohesive unit to define the best possible algorithm that could lead to a single successful pregnancy.

The benefits of using morphokinetics in terms of improving clinical outcomes of IVF is still very unclear. A meta-analysis published in 2017, supported the idea of clinical benefits of time-lapse culture with morphokinetic embryo selection in IVF, reporting reduced early pregnancy loss, higher ongoing pregnancy and higher live birth rates. However, the studies included in the meta analysis were carried out in selected populations and were of dubious quality, meaning we can not rely on this as conclusive evidence that IVF outcomes are improved by using morphokinetic embryo selection and time-lapse technology instead of standard morphological evaluation.

Apart from this, there is limited reviewed evidence to support the clinical benefits of morphokinetics and so robust prospective studies reporting clinical outcomes must be carried out before it can be concluded that morphokinetics when combined with time-lapse technology has the ability to improve clinical outcomes of IVF.
