= Potassium simplex optimized medium =

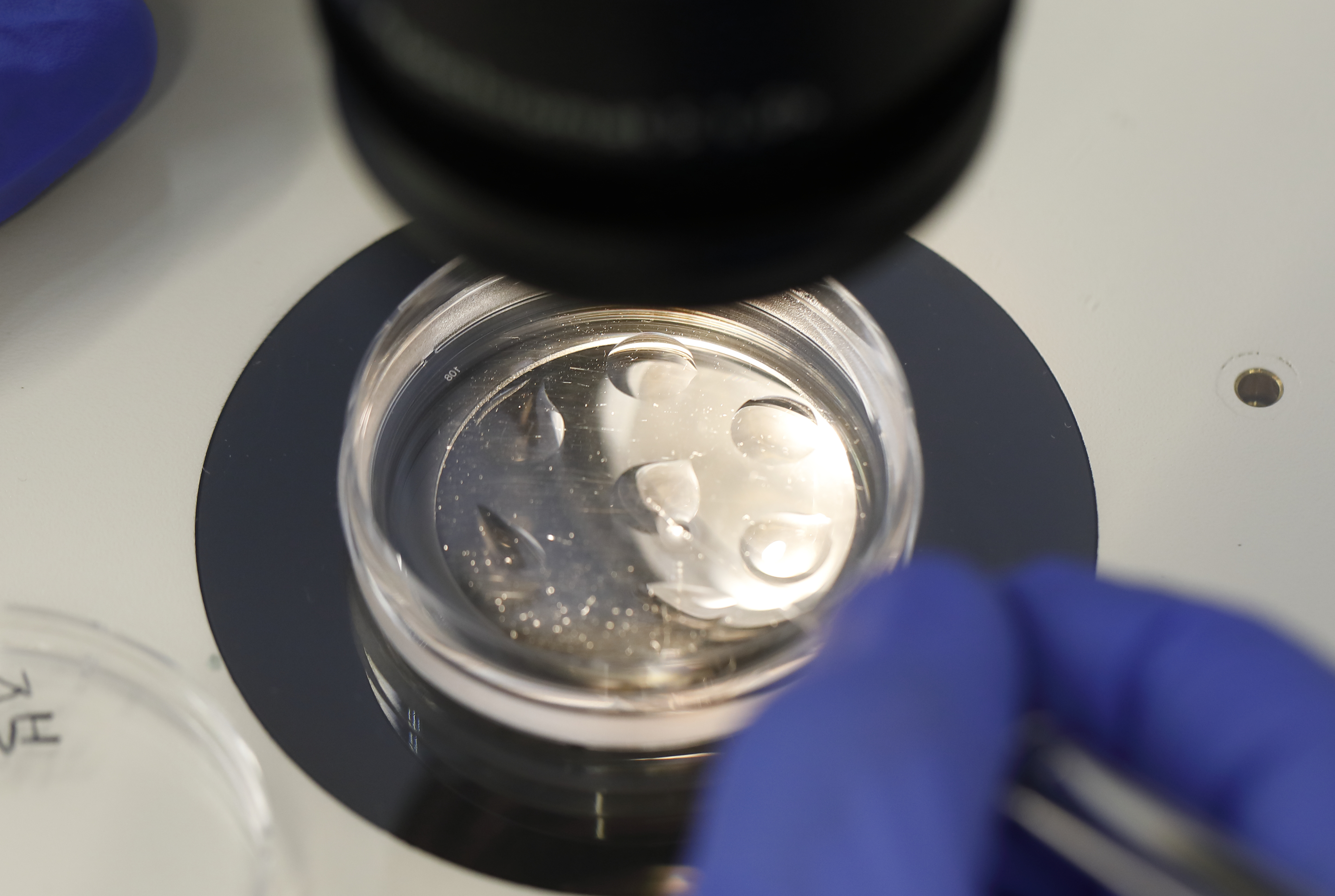
KSOM used in a microdrop culture of mouse embryos

Potassium Simplex Optimized Medium (KSOM) is a specialized medium primarily used for in vitro culture of mouse preimplantation embryos in research.

== Development ==
The culture of preimplantation embryos is of paramount importance as it serves as a foundation for exploring embryo development, advancing assisted reproductive technology, and facilitating the generation of genetically modified animals. The primary motivation behind the establishment of KSOM was to address the phenomenon known as the two-cell block, wherein mouse embryos encounter developmental arrest at the two-cell stage. Researchers Lawitts and Biggers, in their groundbreaking work in the early 1990s, employed a sequential simplex optimization strategy to solve this issue. This method involves a systematic approach to optimize multiple variables simultaneously, allowing for the fine-tuning of media components. Their efforts culminated in the formulation of the Simplex Optimized Medium (SOM). Further refinements based on the intracellular K^{+}/Na^{+} ratio in the two-cell stages led to the evolution of KSOM, potassium-supplemented SOM. Because KSOM uses a bicarbonate buffering mechanism, it is dependent on a CO_{2} incubator to maintain the right pH. The handling of embryos outside a CO_{2} incubator necessitates the use of HEPES buffered media, such as M2.

== Applications and advancements ==
Following the foundational success of KSOM, researchers sought to further enhance the mediums' efficacy. This led to the introduction of amino acid supplementation, resulting in the variant known as KSOM/AA. The availability of amino acids in the medium further aided in the development of mouse embryos and augmented their growth potential. KSOM/AA has ever since become the most widely used medium for the culture of preimplantation mouse embryos in research. Ready-to-use KSOM/AA can be obtained from various commercial vendors but it can also be prepared in-house based on published protocols.

== See also ==
- Embryo culture
- Genetically modified animal
- Growth medium
