= Oocyte selection =

Procedure performed prior to IVF

Oocyte selection is a procedure that is performed prior to in vitro fertilization, in order to use oocytes with maximal chances of resulting in pregnancy. In contrast, embryo selection takes place after fertilization.

Not all women can conceive naturally, leaving them with a need for technologies and research that can help them have children. Women who might not be able to have their kids naturally may have the option of in vitro fertilization. In vitro fertilization can be a series of treatments that involves the fertilization of a mature egg with a sperm in a laboratory. Oocyte selection is a part the process for in vitro fertilization. An Oocyte is an egg/ovum that is not fully mature or developed and has not been fertilized; Therefore an oocyte is an undeveloped ovum.

== Process ==
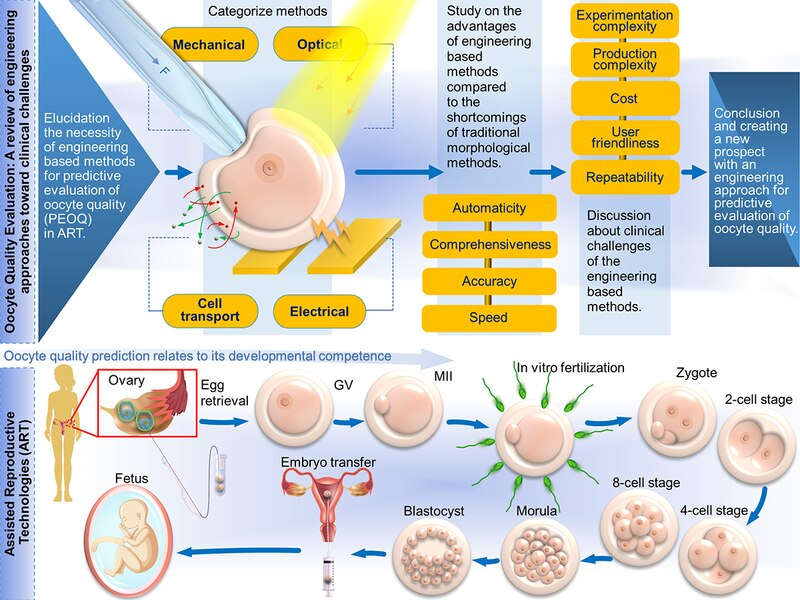
This illustrates the process for accessing oocyte quality before in vitro fertilization

Selecting an oocyte for in vitro fertilization involves assessing the quality of the oocyte which is usually done by accessing the morphological features of the oocyte. The major parts of the oocyte that are accessed for quality in terms of morphological characteristics are the cumulus cells, zona pellucida, polar body, perivitelline space, and cytoplasm; These are the main parts of the oocyte and are usually assessed by conventional microscopy. The size of an oocyte is another factor of the quality of the oocyte; Larger oocyte are usually more quality than smaller ones. Chromosomal evaluation may be performed. Embryos from rescued in vitro-matured metaphase II (IVM-MII) oocytes show significantly higher fertilization rates and more blastomeres per embryo compared with those from arrested metaphase I (MI) oocytes (58.5% vs. 43.9% and 5.7 vs. 5.0, respectively).

Also, morphological features of the oocyte that can be obtained by standard light or polarized light microscopy. However, there is no clear tendency in recent publications to a general increase in predictive value of morphological features. Suggested techniques include zona pellucida imaging, which can detect differences in birefringence between eggs, which is a predictor of compaction, blastulation and pregnancy.

Potentially, polar body biopsy may be used for molecular analysis, and can be used for preimplantation genetic screening.
