= Partner-assisted reproduction =

Method of assisted reproduction

Partner-assisted reproduction, reception of oocytes from partner (ROPA), reciprocal IVF, shared motherhood, partner IVF or co-IVF is a method of family building that is used by couples who both possess female reproductive organs. The method uses in vitro fertilization (IVF), a method that means eggs are removed from the ovaries, fertilized in a laboratory, and then one or more of the resulting embryos are placed in the uterus to hopefully create a pregnancy. Reciprocal IVF differs from standard IVF in that two partners are involved: the eggs are taken from one partner, and the other partner carries the pregnancy. In this way, the process is mechanically identical to IVF with egg donation. Reciprocal IVF offers the highest chance for pregnancy.

This process was first introduced in Spain in 2007 at the CEFER institute.

== Process of reciprocal IVF ==
Reciprocal IVF is a process that involves steps both for the genetic mother and the gestational mother. Below lists the one-by-one steps a couple undergoing this procedure have to go through.

1. Initial consultation: both partners undergo a health screening to determine their overall health and fertility factors. This information can help a couple decide who will donate the eggs and who will carry the baby.
2. Sperm sample: a sperm donor is selected and could be an anonymous or known donor. High-quality sperm increases the likelihood of success and is an important factor to consider.
3. Ovarian stimulation: the partner donating the eggs will undergo an ovarian stimulation cycle and a sequential egg retrieval. Naturally, a woman produces only one egg each month, but, with this hormonal treatment, several eggs are developed. This will allow obtaining several eggs, which can be used throughout several cycles, without the need to repeat this process.
4. Ovarian Puncture: it is a simple procedure, performed under sedation in which a cannula is inserted through the vaginal cavity, to extract the eggs. This aspirate with the eggs is collected in tubes which are sent to the in vitro fertilization laboratory, where the rest of the process is carried out.
5. In vitro fertilization: once the egg is obtained it is fertilized with the donor sperm in a laboratory. This can be done by ICSI technique or regular In vitro fertilization. Once the egg is fertilized, embryos are obtained that are kept in the lab for 3 to 5 days, when they develop to blastocysts. For a fresh IVF cycle, both partners will sync their menstrual cycles to allow for the subsequent transition from egg donation to fertilization to implantation to happen smoothly.
6. Endometrial preparation: the uterine lining of the partner carrying the pregnancy needs to be synchronized with the stage of the embryo development in order for pregnancy to be attained.
7. Genetic testing: once the fertilized embryos have developed into the blastocyst stage, the embryos undergo preimplantation genetic testing (PGT) to test for the correct number of chromosomes to minimize the risk of genetic mutation.
8. Embryo transfer: the strongest and genetically correct embryos are selected and the decided number will be transferred to the gestational carrier.
9. Pregnancy test: after two weeks, a period known as the two-week wait it can be determined if the embryos had been properly implanted and will result in a pregnancy.

=== Choosing partner roles ===
The decision to choose which partner is going to be the egg donor and which partner is going to be the gestational carrier can be based on personal reasons or medical reasons. When focusing strictly on medical advantages, the egg donor tends to be the younger partner, the partner with the stronger ovarian reserve, or the partner without known genetic abnormalities.

The gestational carrier tends to be the partner who has previously given birth, is fit for pregnancy, or the partner with the healthiest uterus. These factors can be determined by a full fertility workup by a healthcare provider prior to starting the reciprocal IVF process.

While some couples base their decision on medical reasons, personal reasons may also be a fundamental deciding factor. Many couples base their decision on emotional and/or psychological reasons of who wants to be the donor and who wants to carry the child to term.

Identity reasons may also play a factor in a couple's decision. For instance, some partners who are biologically able may not want to be the gestational carrier because it misaligns with their gender identity or because testosterone regimens may need altering or cessation. However, while the research is limited, successful reciprocal IVF using oocytes from a transgender male who remained on testosterone throughout the entire process has been documented.

=== Timeline ===
The timeline of reciprocal IVF depends on if a couple chooses to undergo a fresh or a frozen transfer:

- A fresh embryo transfer IVF cycle lasts around 17–20 days and 10 days after the embryo is transferred to wait for the results of a pregnancy test.
- A frozen embryo transfer first involves one of the cycles dedicated to the genetic mother. The second cycle is dedicated to the carrier mother. The actual timing for a frozen embryo transfer is longer and depends on the entire time it takes for two menstrual cycles of the two intended parents and how they line up.

=== Epigenetics ===
Epigenetics includes the changes that occur in the gene expression, but that does not alter the DNA sequence. These changes may be the result of external or environmental factors. There are multiple studies related to epigenetics that show that the surrogate mother can also play an important role in the development of the embryo. This is because the prenatal environment of the uterus, where the embryo will stay for 9 months, and also the nutrients that reach it, have great relevance in the gene expression. Therefore, it is important that the birth mother have a healthy lifestyle and habits, in absence of toxics such as alcohol or tobacco, among others.

After fertilisation, the endometrial fluid nourishes the embryo and regulates its development, before being replaced in this function by the placenta in the later stages of pregnancy. This embryo-mother communication is finely regulated by numerous cellular pathways, including epigenetic mechanisms. Among the substances transported in the endometrial fluid, extracellular vesicles are one of the most important mediators, especially in relation to their ability to transport ncRNAs. Primary human endometrial endothelial cells were found to internalize miRNAs into vesicles and actively secrete large amounts of exosomes. These are internalized by embryonic trophoblast cells and may influence their epigenetic patterns. Even though the capability of numerous ncRNAs (both maternal and embryo-derived) of being transmitted through endometrial fluid has been clearly established, the role of such molecules in the regulation of pivotal phases of implantation and early embryonic development still requires much needed investigation.

This phenomenon has important implications for patients using the ROPA method. Although the embryo does not carry the genes of the gestating mother, her uterus can influence the epigenetic characteristics of her future baby. This can break down some of the emotional barriers to gestational motherhood since they will influence the phenotype of their child even if they do not share DNA.

=== Other related procedures ===
Similar to reciprocal IVF, partners can choose concurrent IVF or double reciprocal IVF. This method is essentially two simultaneous reciprocal IVF processes, where both partners become pregnant at the same time using embryos from the opposite partner. This process allows both partners to undergo embryo transfers and simultaneous gestational carrying. There are potential considerations for concurrent IVF, including increased costs and potential stress from two childbirth deliveries.

Partners also have the option to choose Effortless IVF. This method of reciprocal IVF uses an FDA-approved capsule (called INVOcell) to combine the donor sperm and egg, rather than reproduction in a lab. The partner who is acting as the egg donor will place the capsule back inside the vagina to incubate for around five days. Once the embryo begins development, it is removed and typically frozen. The partner who is acting as the gestational carrier will then prepare for embryo transfer and carry the resulting child to term.

== Costs of Reciprocal IVF ==
In most states, insurance coverage for IVF is not mandated and varies by state. Insurance providers do not typically cover the costs of reciprocal IVF unless it is medically necessary. Only 25% of Americans have coverage for IVF. On average, the cost of one IVF cycle costs about $12,000, which does not include fertility medications that typically range from $3,000 to $10,000. The average cost of reciprocal IVF in the United States is over $20,000 but varies based on the clinic and medication protocols.

The cost of reciprocal IVF is more than IVF due to additional costs including donor sperm fees, legal fees, and fertility medications.

== Success rates ==
As reciprocal IVF is a fairly new process first established in 2009, one study from 2017 found that 60% of couples undergoing IVF with an average donor age of 32 achieved pregnancy. A study published in February 2018 found a 60% live birth rate in a group of 120 lesbian couples who underwent reciprocal IVF. The subject of the research are European patients only.

The success rate of reciprocal IVF heavily depends on the age of the birth mother. For women under age 35, there is a 41–43% success rate. For women over 40, there is a 13–18% success rate.

As IVF is not always successful on the first attempt, it is important that couples understand that multiple cycles may be required to achieve a pregnancy.

== Legal aspects ==
For couples who choose to undergo reciprocal IVF, potential legal issues to be addressed may vary between jurisdictions. One potential issue is the necessity to make sure the partner who donates the egg is a legal parent of the child. This can include getting their name on the birth certificate at the time of birth or may require legally adopting the child. These steps help establish equal parental rights for both the gestational carrier and the egg donor. A legal attorney who specializes in reproductive law can be a useful resource for navigating the specific legal aspects state by state.

In 2023, the Hong Kong High Court ruled that a lesbian who provided an egg but did not carry the baby through reciprocal IVF was a “parent at common law” and that exclusion from parental status was discriminatory.
