= Time-lapse embryo imaging =

Reproductive biology technique

Time-lapse embryo imaging is an emerging non-invasive embryo selection technique used in reproductive biology. It is used to help select embryos with lower risk of defects and/or greater potential of implantation. The procedure involves taking thousands of pictures of the growing embryo in vitro during incubation to study morphology and morphokinetic parameters.

In terms of pregnancy rates, live births, or the risk of stillbirth or miscarriage there is a lack of evidence of sufficient quality to know if there is any difference between time-lapse embryo imaging and conventional embryo assessment in in-vitro fertilisation (IVF). Further trials are needed in order to determine whether time-lapse embryo imaging can impact on outcomes such as live-birth for couples undergoing IVF or ICSI.
