= Embryo cryopreservation =

Preserving an embryo at sub-zero temperatures

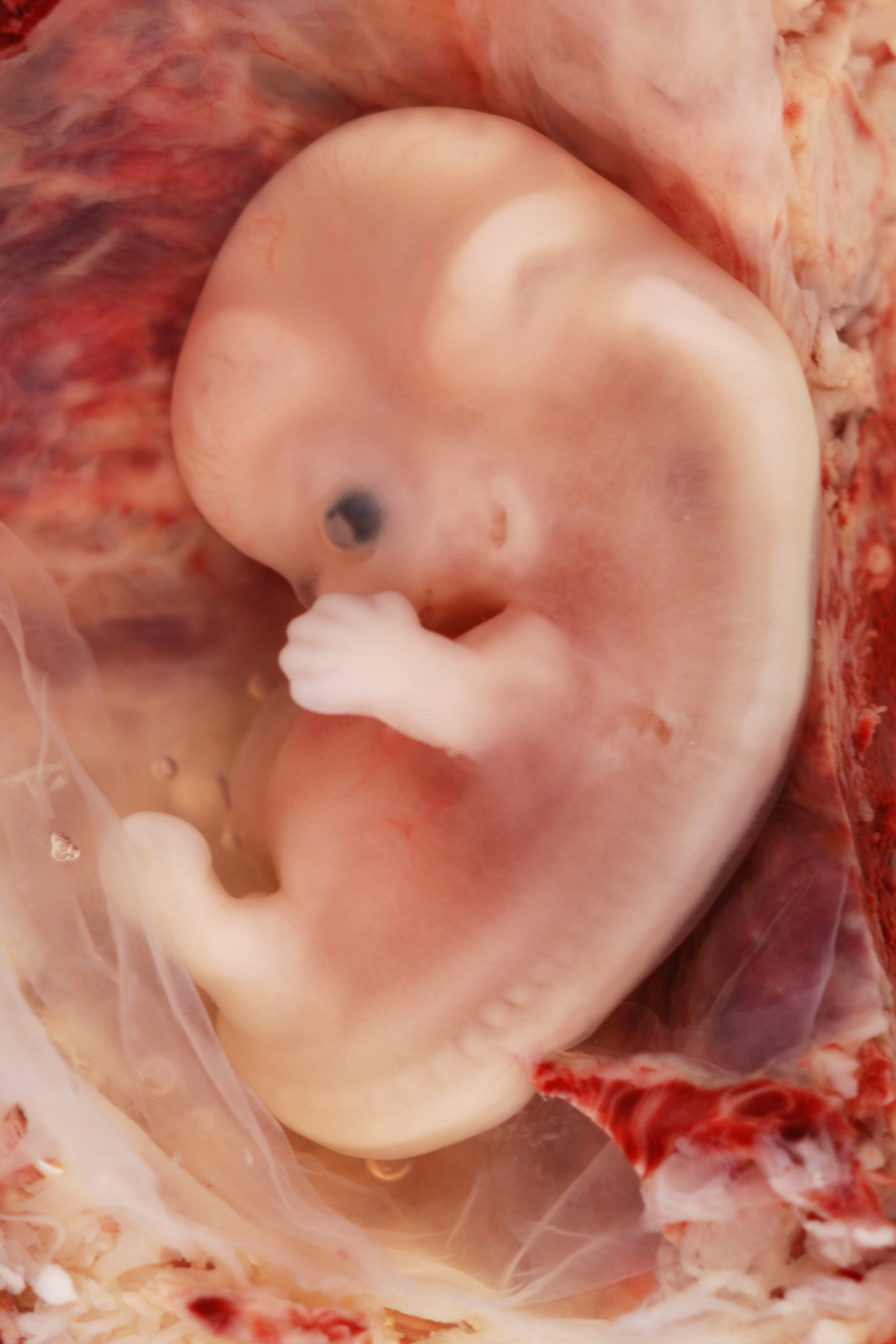
9-week human embryo from ectopic pregnancy

Embryos may be preserved through cryopreservation, generally at an embryogenesis stage corresponding to pre-implantation, that is, from fertilisation to the blastocyst stage.

== Indications ==
Embryo cryopreservation is useful for leftover embryos after a cycle of in vitro fertilisation, as patients who fail to conceive may become pregnant using such embryos without having to go through a full IVF cycle. Or, if pregnancy occurred, they could return later for another pregnancy. Spare oocytes or embryos resulting from fertility treatments may be used for oocyte donation or embryo donation to another woman or couple, and embryos may be created, frozen and stored specifically for transfer and donation by using donor eggs and sperm.

== Method ==
Embryo cryopreservation is generally performed as a component of in vitro fertilization (which generally also includes ovarian hyperstimulation, egg retrieval and embryo transfer). The ovarian hyperstimulation is preferably done by using a GnRH agonist rather than human chorionic gonadotrophin (hCG) for final oocyte maturation, since it decreases the risk of ovarian hyperstimulation syndrome with no evidence of a difference in live birth rate (in contrast to fresh cycles where usage of GnRH agonist has a lower live birth rate).

The main techniques used for embryo cryopreservation are vitrification versus slow programmable freezing (SPF). Slow freezing was more commonly used in "the early days of IVF". Studies indicate that vitrification is superior or equal to SPF in terms of survival and implantation rates. Vitrification appears to result in decreased risk of DNA damage than slow freezing. Vitrification prevent ice crystals in gametes. It is so fast (-23000 °C/min) that these crystals do not appear. Still, the amount of cryoprotectant used in the vitrification is crucial: too much is toxic for the embryo; but too little could cause the appearance of crystallised water, regardless of the speed at which the process is carried out. There are two types of vitrification system. In the open vitrification system, the sample has direct contact with liquid nitrogen, which allows ultra-fast freezing. In the closed vitrification system, samples are placed in a sealed device before being immersed in liquid nitrogen. In this way, the sample is protected from any direct contact with nitrogen. It is used to cryopreserve biological risk samples.

== Prevalence ==
World usage data is hard to come by but it was reported in a study of 23 countries that almost 42,000 frozen human embryo transfers were performed during 2001 in Europe.

== Pregnancy outcome and determinants ==
In current state of the art, early embryos having undergone cryopreservation implant at the same rate as equivalent fresh counterparts. The outcome from using cryopreserved embryos has uniformly been positive with no increase in birth defects or development abnormalities, also between fresh versus frozen eggs used for intracytoplasmic sperm injection (ICSI). In fact, pregnancy rates are increased following frozen embryo transfer, and perinatal outcomes are less affected, compared to embryo transfer in the same cycle as ovarian hyperstimulation was performed. The endometrium is believed to not be optimally prepared for implantation following ovarian hyperstimulation, and therefore frozen embryo transfer avails for a separate cycle to focus on optimizing the chances of successful implantation. Children born from vitrified blastocysts have significantly higher birthweight than those born from non-frozen blastocysts. For early cleavage embryos, frozen ones appear to have at least as good obstetric outcome, measured as preterm birth and low birthweight for children born after cryopreservation as compared with children born after fresh cycles.

Oocyte age, survival proportion, and number of transferred embryos are predictors of pregnancy outcome.

Pregnancies have been reported from embryos stored for over 30 years. In July 2025, the birth of a baby from a human embryo frozen in 1994 was reported in the United States, marking the longest-known interval between embryo freezing and live birth. The embryo was adopted and transferred in 2024, resulting in the birth of Thaddeus Daniel Pierce, a healthy baby boy, in Ohio. Previous successful pregnancies have resulted from embryos stored for up to 27 years. A study of more than 11,000 cryopreserved human embryos showed no significant effect of storage time on post-thaw survival for IVF or oocyte donation cycles, or for embryos frozen at the pronuclear or cleavage stages. In addition, the duration of storage had no significant effect on clinical pregnancy, miscarriage, implantation, or live birth rate, whether from IVF or oocyte donation cycles.

A study in France between 1999 and 2011 came to the result that embryo freezing before administration of gonadotoxic chemotherapy agents to females caused a delay of treatment in 34% of cases, and a live birth in 27% of surviving cases who wanted to become pregnant, with the follow-up time varying between 1 and 13 years.

== Legislation ==
From 1 October 2009, human embryos are allowed to be stored for 10 years in the UK, according to the Human Fertilisation and Embryology Act 2008.

== History ==
The cryopreservation of embryos was first successfully attempted in 1984 in the case of Zoe Leyland, the first baby to be born from a frozen embryo. In Zoe's case, the embryo had been frozen for two months, but since the inception of the practice of cryopreservation after successful IVF, embryos have successfully survived in cryopreservation extensively longer periods of time, spanning even decades. The long-term implications of freezing embryos are demonstrated in the case of Thaddeus Daniel Pierce, a child born in 2025 from the viable pregnancy of his mother who used an embryo, which had been stored in a cryogenic freezer since 1994. The first twins derived from frozen embryos were born in February 1985. Since then and up to 2008 it is estimated that between 350,000 and half a million IVF babies have been born from embryos frozen at a controlled rate and then stored in liquid nitrogen; additionally a few hundred births have been born from vitrified oocytes but firm figures are hard to come by.

It may be noted that Subash Mukhopadyay from Kolkata, India reported the successful cryopreservation of an eight cell embryo, storing it for 53 days, thawing and replacing it into the mother's womb, resulting in a successful and live birth as early as 1978- a full five years before Trounson and Mohr had done so. A small publication of Mukherjee in 1978 clearly shows that Mukherjee was on the right line of thinking much before anyone else had demonstrated the successful outcome of a pregnancy following the transfer of a 8-cell frozen-thawed embryo into human subjects transferring 8-cell cryopreserved embryos.

== Implications ==
The practice of cryopreservation of embryos has increased in recent years. While the original purpose of freezing embryos was to help heterosexual couples who struggled with infertility, the practice has become an increasingly common avenue to start a family for homosexual couples, single women, as well as surrogates. Prior to successful attempts to effectively freeze embryos for later use, individuals were limited in their assisted reproductive technology options to in vitro fertilization (IVF), whereby sperm and egg were combined in a lab to create the embryos, all of which then had to be immediately implanted into the mother. Cryopreservation enables the embryos to be safely stored for extensive periods of time. Individuals are then able choose the proper time to use the embryos as well as elect to use only one embryo at a time while saving the others for later use. Doing so reduces the possibility of conceiving twins or triplets, thus allowing parents to exercise greater control over their vision for their families. Additionally, embryos may be tested and manipulated to eliminate genetic diseases.

=== Legal implications ===
While the cryopreservation of embryos has been characterized by great scientific developments over the years, the treatment of allocation of embryos in the event of a divorce or separation of the parties is a broadening and still less developed area of the law which continues to present challenges for the courts today. Politicians, state legislatures, and courts grapple with a multitude of legal issues surrounding families created using fertility treatments in view of divergent moral, political, and legal discourse throughout the United States. For example, in Illinois, the courts employ at least two clear approaches to determining how embryos are allocated in the event of a divorce or separation of the parties. Specifically, the courts seek to enforce any contractual language surrounding the allocation of the embryos, and they also employ a balancing test of the parties' interests alongside the contractual approach or simply as an alternative approach if no contract exists. State courts are often left to decide these issues as statutory resources are not well-developed across the states. For example, in Illinois, the Illinois Parentage Act of 2015 has contemplated situations in which parties, represented by independent legal counsel, enter into contractual agreements regarding the allocation of embryos, but no uniform statutory answer exists for situations in which parties failed to enter into such written agreements regarding allocation.
