= Fertility medication =

Medical treatment for low fertility

Fertility medications, also known as fertility drugs, are medications which enhance reproductive fertility. For women, fertility medication is used to stimulate follicle development of the ovary. There are very few fertility medication options available for men.

Agents that enhance ovarian activity can be classified as either gonadotropin releasing hormone, estrogen antagonists or gonadotropins.

Treatment decision-making involves four major factors: efficacy, burden of treatment (such as frequency of injections and office visits), safety, and financial costs.

== Female ==
=== Main techniques ===
The main techniques involving fertility medication in females are:

- Ovulation induction, with the aim of producing one or two ovulatory follicles for fertilization by sexual intercourse or artificial insemination
- Controlled ovarian hyperstimulation, which is generally part of in vitro fertilization, and the aim is generally to develop multiple follicles (optimally between 12 and 14 antral follicles measuring 2–8 mm in diameter), followed by transvaginal oocyte retrieval, co-incubation, followed by embryo transfer of a maximum of two embryos at a time.
- Final maturation induction of follicles, also triggering a predictable time of ovulation.

=== Gonadotropin-releasing hormone ===
Either gonadotropin-releasing hormone (GnRH) or any gonadotropin-releasing hormone agonist (such as Lupron) may be used in combination with luteinizing hormone (LH) using an infusion pump to simulate endogenous hormone production. GnRH stimulates the release of gonadotropins (LH and FSH) from the anterior pituitary in the body. This set of therapy is reserved for a subset of women with infertility and have produced ovulation rates of 90% and pregnancy rates of 80% or higher.

=== Antiestrogens ===
Antiestrogens inhibit the effects of estrogen, which include selective estrogen receptor modulators (SERM) and aromatase inhibitors.

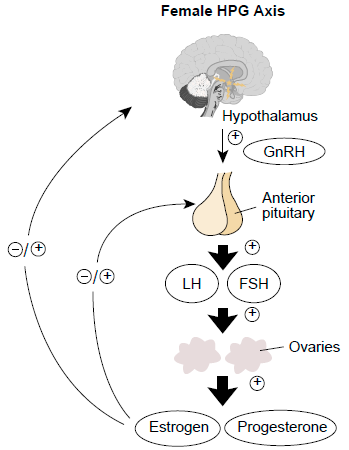
Hypothalamic–pituitary–gonadal axis in females, with estrogen exerting mainly negative feedback on FSH secretion from the pituitary gland.

==== Selective estrogen receptor modulators ====
Clomiphene is a selective estrogen receptor modulator (SERM). It is the most widely used fertility drug. Other medications in this class include tamoxifen and raloxifene, although both are not as effective as clomiphene and are thus less widely used for fertility purposes. They are used in ovulation induction by inhibiting the negative feedback of estrogen at the hypothalamus. As the negative feedback of estrogen is inhibited, the hypothalamus secretes GnRh which in turn stimulates the anterior pituitary to secrete LH and FSH which help in ovulation. Between 60 and 85% of women, mostly with polyendocrine metabolic ovarian syndrome (PMOS), ovulate successfully in response to clomiphene with a cumulative pregnancy rate of 30 to 40%.

==== Aromatase inhibitors ====
Although primarily used in breast cancer treatment, aromatase inhibitors (particularly generic letrozole) are also used in ovulation induction. Aromatase inhibitors are a common fertility treatment to treat women with polyendocrine metabolic ovarian syndrome (PMOS). A meta-analysis analyzing live birth rates for women with PMOS treated with clomiphene compared to letrozole found that letrozole resulted in higher live birth rates. However, ovulation induction remains an off-label indication, which affects use.

=== Gonadotropins ===
Gonadotropins are protein hormones that stimulate the gonads (testes and ovaries). For medication, they can be extracted from urine in postmenopausal women or through genetic modification and bacterial recombination. Examples of recombinant FSH are Follistim and Gonal F, while Luveris is a recombinant LH. FSH and recombinant FSH analogues are mainly used for controlled ovarian hyperstimulation as well as ovulation induction. There has been some controversy over the efficacy between extracted and recombinant FSH for ovulation induction; however, a meta-analysis of 15 trials among 2348 women found that there were no differences in clinical pregnancy or live birth outcomes.

Chemotherapy treatment in premenopausal women can compromise ovarian reserve and function, with gonadotoxic effects ranging from temporary to permanent infertility and premature ovarian failure (POF). Proposed mechanisms for chemotherapy-induced ovarian damage include apoptosis of growing follicles, fibrosis of stromal cells, and injury to blood vessels resulting in ischemia. First-line options for fertility preservation include embryo and oocyte preservation before starting chemotherapy, though these methods do not contribute to the preservation of gonadal function. GnRH agonist therapies have been associated with relatively low risk, time, and cost. There is evidence that chemotherapy cotreatment with gonadotropin-releasing hormone (GnRH) can increase the probability of spontaneous menses and ovulation resumption. However, this cotreatment has not shown an improvement in pregnancy rates.

=== Human chorionic gonadotropin ===
Human chorionic gonadotropin (hCG), also known as the "hormone of pregnancy", is a hormone that is normally produced during pregnancy and plays an integral role throughout reproduction. It is crucial in maintaining pregnancy, from the stages of placentation to early embryo development. It is also used in assisted reproductive techniques as it can be used to replace LH in final maturation induction.

=== Other medications ===
Although metformin has been used off-label to treat oligomenorrhea and ovarian hyperstimulation syndrome (OHSS) in women with polyendocrine metabolic ovarian syndrome (PMOS), metformin is no longer recommended as infertility treatment per the American Society for Reproductive Medicine (ASRM) in 2017. Its use to treat anovulatory infertility was based on an association of insulin resistance in non-obese women with PMOS. While metformin may increase ovulation in women with PMOS, there is no evidence of increased pregnancy rates or live-birth rates, and the combination therapy of metformin and clomiphene citrate did not provide a significant benefit compared to clomiphene citrate alone. First-line therapy for ovulation induction in women with PMOS remains the anti-estrogen clomiphene citrate or the aromatase inhibitor letrozole.

== Male ==
Treatment for oligospermia is centered around underlying causes, such as endocrine and systematic disorders that can cause hypogonadism.

Typically, other assisted reproductive technologies are used. Although there is no FDA indication for use of aromatase inhibitors improving spermatogenesis, testolactone has been shown to be effective when compared to placebo.

Though there is no FDA indication for the use of clomiphene in male infertility, it has been prescribed since the 1960s. As of 2013, there is not substantial evidence to suggest that clomiphene can treat male infertility.

Combinations of vitamins and minerals, including selenium, co-enzyme Q10, L-carnitine, folic acid, zinc, eicosapentaenoic acid (EPA), and docosahexaenoic acid (DHA), have been shown to improve male infertility, but due to the low amounts of studies and participants, more clinical studies are needed. Folate in combination with zinc supplementation was shown to have a statistically significant effect on sperm concentration and morphology when compared to placebo. There is evidence suggesting a significant association between vitamin D serum concentrations and the quality of sperm in men, characterized by the sperm's motility and progress motility. Because the quality of men's sperm is influenced by genetics, results should be interpreted cautiously. There is little evidence that supplementation with antioxidants, such as pentoxifylline will increase male fertility.

As of September 2017, mesenchymal stem cell therapy for infertility has been studied in animals, but has not entered clinical trials. Stem cells collected from bone marrow and umbilical cord have shown the most ability to rehabilitate fertility in animals, but more studies are needed to determine efficacy.

== Adverse effects ==
=== Cancer ===
Since infertility increases the risk of ovarian cancer, fertility drugs have been used to combat this, but the cancer risks are still not completely known. As of 2019, studies have shown the risk of developing ovarian cancer is higher when taking fertility medications. However, due to the low number of studies, lack of follow-up time and other contribution factors, the risk is unclear. Most studies have shown that fertility drugs do not increase the risk of other gynecologic cancers (cervical and endometrial) or other malignant cancers (thyroid, colon, melanoma, breast). The validity of these data may be affected by patient-reported biases, small subject numbers, and other confounding variables.

Children born to mothers who use fertility medication to induce ovulation are more than twice as likely to develop leukemia during their childhoods than other children.

=== Ovarian hyperstimulation syndrome ===
Estrogen antagonists and gonadotropins may stimulate multiple follicles and other ovarian hormones leading to multiple birth and possible ovarian hyperstimulation syndrome (OHSS). Development of OHSS is dependent on the administration of hCG and is mediated through vascular endothelial growth factor (VEGF). OHSS is characterized as enlargement of the ovaries.

Multiple birth is especially deleterious due to compounding risks including premature delivery and low birthweight, pre-eclampisa, and increased risk of neonatal mortality. While triplet births have been declining in ART, in 2022 multiple births remained over 45% of births from IVF in the USA. However, there are limitations to measure, as 4% to 8% IVF clinics to do not report their data to the CDC.

In 2020, UK statistics showed that 11% of IVF pregnancies led to multiple births, compared to 1-2% of natural pregnancies. Australian figures in 2024 noted that multiple births after ART had halved in the last ten years, with only 2.7% births leading to twins or triplets.

== Discontinuation ==
Main reasons for discontinuation across all types of fertility treatment and treatment stage, are "postponement of treatment, physical and psychological burden and relational and personal problems".

== See also ==
- Assisted reproductive technology
- Diethylstilbestrol
