= Ovarian stimulation =

Ovarian stimulation may refer to:

- Ovulation induction, reversing anovulation or oligoovulation
- Final maturation induction of oocytes
- Controlled ovarian hyperstimulation, stimulating the development of multiple follicles of the ovaries in one single cycle
- Physiologic hormonal stimulation of folliculogenesis
