= Ovarian hyperstimulation =

Ovarian hyperstimulation may refer to:

- Controlled ovarian hyperstimulation
- Ovarian hyperstimulation syndrome
