= Richard Paulson =

American medical doctor and reproductive endocrinologist

Richard J. Paulson
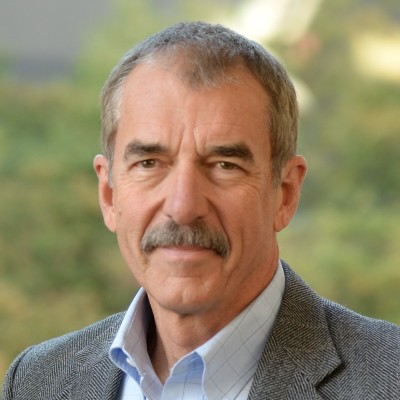
- Born: February 2, 1955 (age 71); Prague, Czechoslovakia
- Citizenship: American
- Education: University of California, Los Angeles (B.S., M.D.); University of Southern California (M.S.)
- Known for: Oocyte donation, reproductive aging, endometrial receptivity
- Medical career
- Profession: Medical doctor, researcher, academic
- Institutions: Keck School of Medicine of USC

Richard J. Paulson (born February 2, 1955) is an American medical doctor, researcher, and academic specializing in reproductive endocrinology and infertility. He is Professor of Obstetrics and Gynecology and holder of the Alia Tutor Chair in Reproductive Medicine at the Keck School of Medicine of the University of Southern California (USC), where he has directed the USC Fertility program since 1986. He is known for research on the use of oocyte donation to extend fertility in older women and for contributions to understanding endometrial receptivity, natural-cycle IVF, and oocyte cryopreservation.

Paulson has authored or co-authored 300 peer-reviewed publications. According to Google Scholar, his publications have received more than 17,000 citations, and he has an h-index of 72.

== Early life and education ==
Paulson was born in Prague, Czechoslovakia, and became a United States citizen in 1972. He earned a Bachelor of Science in Physics, magna cum laude, from the University of California, Los Angeles (UCLA) in 1976, and his M.D. from the UCLA School of Medicine in 1980.

== Academic career ==
Paulson joined the USC faculty in 1986 as a Clinical Instructor and was promoted to associate professor in 1991 and full Professor in 1996. He has served as Chief of the Division of Reproductive Endocrinology and Infertility and Director of the IVF Program at USC since 1995. In 2014, he was appointed to the endowed Alia Tutor Chair in Reproductive Medicine. He also serves as Vice Chair for Administrative Affairs in the Department of Obstetrics and Gynecology.

== Research contributions ==
Paulson's research has focused on reproductive aging, embryo implantation, oocyte donation, oocyte cryopreservation, and fertility preservation.

Paulson's research helped establish oocyte donation as a treatment for age-related infertility. Studies conducted with colleagues demonstrated that pregnancy rates in women receiving donated oocytes were not significantly affected by recipient age, supporting the conclusion that reproductive aging is primarily related to egg quality rather than uterine function. His group also reported some of the earliest successful pregnancies through oocyte donation in women over 50 and later examined maternal, neonatal, and psychosocial outcomes in this population.

In a 1990 paper in Fertility and Sterility, Paulson characterized the concept of endometrial receptivity as a key determinant of embryo implantation success in human IVF.

Beginning in 1989, Paulson and colleagues systematically evaluated IVF performed in unstimulated (natural) menstrual cycles.

Paulson was a co-author on the first United States report of successful pregnancies following cryopreservation of human embryos, published in 1987.

A 1988 paper co-authored by Paulson demonstrated that human ovarian theca cells produce renin, contributing to the understanding of the ovarian renin–angiotensin system and its possible role in ovarian hyperstimulation syndrome.

Research by Paulson's group, published in 1994 demonstrated that vaginally administered progesterone achieves higher uterine tissue concentrations than the intramuscular route, findings that contributed to a clinical shift toward vaginal progesterone supplementation in IVF luteal phase support, an area that continues to be debated in the field.

Paulson led early clinical research into oocyte cryopreservation at USC, helping establish one of the first fertility preservation programs using this technique in the United States in the early 2000s.

== Awards and recognition ==
- The Best Doctors in America, listed continuously since 1994 (Woodward/White, Inc.)
- Excellence in Teaching Award, Keck School of Medicine of USC / Association of Professors of Gynecology and Obstetrics, 2004
- Howard and Georgeanna Jones Lifetime Achievement Award, American Fertility Association, 2005
- Distinguished Physician Award, Obstetrical and Gynecological Assembly of Southern California, 2012
- ASRM Service Milestone Award, 2012
- ASRM Star Award, 2012–2013
- Honorary Membership, Middle East Fertility Society, 2021

== Books ==
- Lobo, RA; Mishell, DR Jr; Paulson, RJ; Shoupe, D (1997). Infertility, Contraception and Reproductive Endocrinology (4th ed.). Cambridge, Massachusetts: Blackwell Scientific Publications.
- Paulson, RJ; Sachs, J (1998). Rewinding Your Biological Clock: Motherhood Late in Life. New York: W.H. Freeman and Company.
- Goodwin, TM; Montoro, MN; Muderspach, LI; Paulson, RJ; Roy, S (2010). Management of Common Problems in Obstetrics and Gynecology (5th ed.). Oxford, UK: Wiley-Blackwell.
