= Ovarian drilling =

- Specialty: Gynaecology

Ovarian drilling, also known as multiperforation or laparoscopic ovarian diathermy, is a surgical technique of puncturing the membranes surrounding the ovary with a laser beam or a surgical needle using minimally invasive laparoscopic procedures. It differs from ovarian wedge resection, which involves the cutting of tissue. Minimally invasive ovarian drilling procedures have replaced wedge resections. Ovarian drilling is favored over wedge resection because cutting into the ovary might result in adhesions, potentially complicating postoperative outcomes. Ovarian drilling and ovarian wedge resection are treatment options to reduce the amount of androgen producing tissue in women with polyendocrine metabolic ovarian syndrome (PMOS). PMOS is the primary cause of anovulation, which results in female infertility. The induction of mono-ovulatory cycles can restore fertility.

The first-line medical treatment for infertility in women with PMOS is the oral drug letrozole to induce ovulation. Patients are considered resistant if the treatment fails for six months at the appropriate dosage. Women who are resistant to the medication are commonly treated with medications that induce ovulation such as gonadotrophins. Medications that induce ovulation can also be associated with multiple pregnancies and problems with the women's cycle and this therapy is very expensive due to the requirement for regular ultrasounds, laparoscopic ovarian drilling is sometimes considered by medical professionals for treating anovulation. Known side effects and risks include the need for anesthesia, the risk of infection, and a risk of adhesions forming. There may sometimes be a smaller risk of the person losing ovarian function.

Ovarian drilling is a surgical alternative to CC treatment or recommended for women with WHO Group II ovulation disorders. Other non-surgical medical options in the treatment of PMOS include the oestrogen receptor modulator tamoxifen, aromatase inhibitors, insulin sensitising drugs, and hormonal ovarian stimulation. The effectiveness of the surgical procedure is similar to CC or gonadotropin treatment for induced ovulation for PMOS patients, but results in fewer multiple pregnancies per ongoing pregnancy regardless if the technique is unilaterally or bilaterally performed.

If patients do not become pregnant six months after ovulation has been reestablished from ovarian drilling treatment, drug treatments may be reintroduced or in vitro fertilisation (IVF) may be considered.

== Hormonal effects ==
Part of the criteria of PMOS diagnosis includes elevated levels of androgens in the bloodstream or other signs of androgen excess (hyperandrogenism). The procedure causes a drop in serum androgen levels and possibly in estrogen levels. After ovarian follicles and stroma are destroyed, there is a reduction in these hormone levels. The procedure results in a decrease in plasma luteinizing hormone (LH) and in pulsations as well as a periodic drop in inhibin B levels. The most plausible theory states that the reduction of these hormone concentrations leads to an increase in the secretion of follicle-stimulating hormone (FSH) and sex hormone-binding globulin, leading to effective follicular maturation and ovulation. Low serum oestradiol concentrations are associated with decreased aromatase activity. Inflammatory growth factors such as insulin-like growth factor-1 are produced due to injury and aid the effects of FSH through greater blood flow and gonadotropin delivery. Circulating and intrafollicular levels of anti-Müllerian hormone (AMH), which can help quantify recruitable ovarian follicle activity, are reduced after laparoscopic ovarian drilling in women with PMOS.

== Procedures ==
When the clinician determines that ovarian drilling is appropriate and the woman decides to undergo this treatment, consent is obtained. The risks are communicated to the woman.

The most commonly performed method is with a monopolar needle or hook because of the equipment's availability and simple installation. Other common instrumentation consists of the use of a bipolar electrical surgical electrodes or a CO_{2}, argon, or ND-YAG laser. This instrumentation has the ability to produce the intended results with a very focal approach. Typically, a 100 W electrical cautery dissector is first used to cross the ovarian cortex, then electrocoagulation is performed at 40 W, however rates range from 30 to 400 W. The surgical punctures are performed on the ovarian cortex and are usually 4–10 mm deep and 3 mm wide. The number of punctures is related to subsequent ability to conceive—it has been found that five to ten punctures are more likely to produce the intended conception. Ovarian drilling is performed laparoscopically and either transumbilical (culdoscopy) or transvaginal (fertiloscopy).

== Risks ==
Though preferable to creating incisions on the ovary, ovarian drilling does have some risks. These are: pelvic adhesion formation, hemorrhage, gas embolism, pneumothorax, premature ovarian failure, long-term ovarian function, developing hyperstimulation syndrome, adhesion formation, infertility and multiple births. Transvaginal hydrolaparoscopy (THL) ovarian drilling may minimize the risk of iatrogenic adhesion formation and decreased ovarian reserve (DOR), which can impinge upon fertility. LOD does not contribute to the risk of decreased ovarian reserve. There is risk of electrical accidents with monopoly current. A rare complication of LOD is major vascular injury, mostly on the small vessels in the anterior abdominal wall when the Veress needle and trocar are inserted at the beginning of the procedure.

== Advantages ==
Ovarian drilling has lower rates of ovarian hyperstimulation syndrome and of multi-fetal gestation. The advantages of the procedure also include its singular treatment, as opposed to several trials of ovulation inductions. Other benefits of this technique include cost-effectiveness and that it can be performed as an outpatient procedure.

== History ==
Ovarian drilling was first used in the treatment of PMOS in 1984 and has evolved as a safe and effective surgery. After performing laparoscopic electrosurgical ovarian drilling in CC-resistant patients in 1984, Gjönnaess found that this technique increased ovulation rates to 45 percent and pregnancy rates to 42 percent. In 1988, laparoscopic multiple punch resection of ovaries on the hypothalamo-pituitary axis, slightly modified from Gjönnaess's operation, caused a reduction in LH pulsation and pituitary responsiveness in the treatment of PMOS. In 1989, ovarian drilling was conducted with argon, carbon dioxide (CO_{2}) or potassium-titanyl-phosphate (KTP) laser vaporization causing spontaneous ovulation in 71 percent of those treated. The procedure has been modified and popularized in the treatment of patients with CC-resistance.
