= Gonadotropin preparations =

Type of medication

- Drug class

Class identifiers
- Synonyms: Gonadotropins; LH; FSH; hCG
- Use: Infertility, hypogonadism
- ATC code: G03GA
- Biological target: Gonadotropin receptors (LHCGR, FSHR)
- Chemical class: Glycoproteins

Legal status

Gonadotropin preparations are drugs that mimic the physiological effects of gonadotropins, used therapeutically mainly as fertility medication for ovarian hyperstimulation and ovulation induction. For example, the so-called menotropins consist of LH and FSH extracted from human urine from menopausal women. There are also recombinant variants.

== FSH and LH preparations ==
hMG (human Menopausal Gonadotrophins), FSH and LH prepared from human urine collected from postmenopausal women. First extracted in 1953. Injected intra-muscularily (IM) or subcutaneously (SC).

Generic

menotropins for injections, USP

Brands

- Menopur, 5 mL vials containing 75 IU FSH and 75 IU LH.
- Repronex, vials containing either 75 IU FSH and 75 IU LH, or 150 IU FSH and 150 IU LH.

Common side effects of preparations containing FSH and LH are:

- Mild bloating
- Pain, swelling, or irritation injection site
- Rash at injection site or other part of body
- Stomach pain or pelvic pain

== FSH preparations ==
Preparations of follicle-stimulating hormone (FSH) mainly include those derived from the urine of menopausal women, as well as recombinant preparations. The recombinant preparations are more pure and more easily administered, but they are more expensive. The urinary preparations are equally effective and less expensive, but are not as convenient to administer as they are available in vials versus injection pens. One study reported that users of the purified urinary FSH preparation Bravelle experienced less injection site pain compared to the recombinant preparation Follistim.

=== Urinary preparations ===
Purified urinary FSH (75 IU FSH and ≤ 2 IU of LH)

Generic

urofollitropin for injection, purified.

Brands

- Bravelle, U.S., (≤ 2 IU LH)
- Metrodin, U.S. and Canada, (≤ 1 IU LH)
- Fertinorm Hp, (Canada)

Highly purified urinary FSH (75 IU FSH and ≤ 0.1 IU LH/1000 IU FSH)

Generic

urofollitropin for injection, (highly) purified.

Brands

Fertinex (≤ 0.1 IU LH/1000 IU FSH)

=== Recombinant preparations ===
Follitropin alfa

Generic

Follitropin alfa injection

Brands

Gonal-f
Cinnal-f
Fertilex
Ovaleap
Bemfola

Generic

Follitropin alfa / lutropin alfa combination

Brands

Pergoveris

Follitropin beta

Generic

follitropin beta injection

Brands

Follistim AQ
Puregon

Follitropin delta

Generic

follitropin delta injection

Brands

Rekovelle

The package insert for Gonal-f states that based on physio-chemical tests and bioassays that follitropin beta and follitropin alfa are indistinguishable. Two studies showed no difference. However, a more recent study showed there may be a slight clinical difference, with the alfa form tending towards a higher pregnancy rate and the beta form tending towards a lower pregnancy rate, but with significantly higher estradiol (E2) levels.

The package insert for Puregon states that structural analysis shows that the amino acid sequence of follitropin beta is identical to that of natural human follicle stimulating hormone (hFSH). Further, the ogliosaccharide side chains are very similar, but not completely identical to that of natural hFSH. However, these small differences do not affect the bioactivity compared to natural hFSH.

Gonal-f was approved for medical use in the European Union in October 1995.

Puregon was approved for medical use in the European Union in February 1996.

Rekovelle was approved for medical use in the European Union in December 2016.

==== Biosimilars ====
Ovaleap was approved for medical use in the European Union in September 2013. It was approved for medical use in Australia in March 2021.

Bemfola was approved for medical use in the European Union in March 2014.

=== Side effects of FSH preparations ===
Side effects of FSH preparations include:

- Local irritation at the injection site
- Feeling of fullness, bloating, and tenderness in the lower abdomen due to increasing size of the ovaries.
- Mood swings
- Fatigue

== FSH analogues ==
Corifollitropin alfa

Merck received approval on February 15, 2010, from the European Commission for ELONVA (corifollitropin alfa) a long lasting single injection fusion protein lacking LH activity. Only one injection is required for the first seven days, replacing the first seven daily injections of conventional FSH. Initial results demonstrates similar pregnancy rates as daily recombinant FSH injections.

== LH (Luteinizing hormone) preparations ==
Prepared from recombinant DNA.

Generic

lutropin alfa for injection

Brands

Luveris

== hCG preparations ==
Human chorionic gonadotropin (hCG) can be recovered from the urine of pregnant women or be produced from recombinant DNA. It acts similarly to LH, but the larger supply makes it less costly; it also has a longer half-life. In veterinary medicine, equine chorionic gonadotropin (eCG) extracted from pregnant mare serum is used instead on a variety of mammals, sometimes eliciting an immune response in non-horse species.

In Women: Used to induce final maturation of follicle and subsequent ovulation. Also used for luteal phase support.

In men: Used to treat select cases of Hypogonadotropic Hypogonadism in adult males. In off-label use, some urologists prescribe hCG in low doses in combination with testosterone replacement to preserve fertility.

In male children: Also used to treat prepubertal cryptorchidism not due to anatomical obstruction. Therapy is usually administered between ages 4 and 9.

=== Urinary preparations ===
Derived from the urine of pregnant women.

Generic

(human) chorionic gonadotropin for injection, USP

Brands

- Pregnyl (Merck/Schering-Plough)
- Follutein
- Profasi
- Novarel

=== Recombinant preparations ===
Generic

choriogonadotropin alfa for injection (recombinant human Chorionic Gonadotropin, r-hCG).

Brands

Ovidrel
