= Oocyte cryopreservation =

Procedure to preserve a woman's eggs (oocytes)

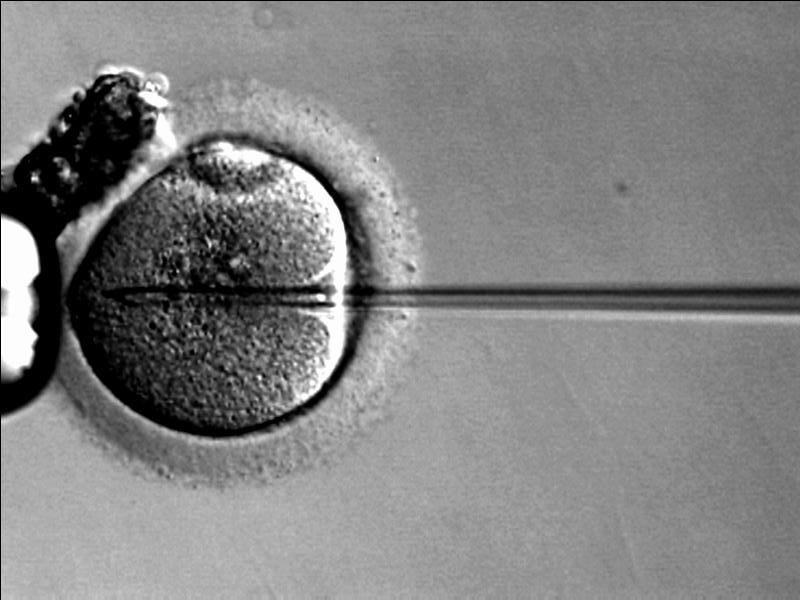
ICSI sperm injection into oocyte

Oocyte cryopreservation (commonly referred to as OC or egg freezing) is a form of Assisted reproductive technology used to preserve human eggs (oocytes). The technique is often used to delay childbearing, protecting against future infertility. When pregnancy is desired, the eggs can be thawed, fertilized, and transferred to the uterus as embryos. The procedure's success rate varies depending on factors such as the individual's age (with higher odds of success in younger individuals), overall health, and genetic factors. The first human birth resulting from oocyte cryopreservation was reported in 1986. Although embryo cryopreservation is the most established method of fertility preservation, oocyte cryopreservation is often the best option for single reproductive-age women seeking to delay childbearing.

== Applications ==
Individuals who wish to preserve their fertility often use oocyte cryopreservation, allowing them to conceive later in life.

Individuals diagnosed with cancer, who are planning to undergo chemotherapy or radiotherapy, can use oocyte cryopreservation to preserve fertility before treatment begins, since these treatments are toxic to eggs. Fertility preservation is a key part of discussing cancer treatment in reproductive-age patients who are at risk of infertility after therapy: in one study, 70% of female cancer patients were concerned about fertility at the time of diagnosis, and 50% desired to have children after treatment.

Those undergoing assisted reproductive treatments who do not consider embryo freezing an option due to ethical, legal, or personal reasons often choose oocyte cryopreservation instead.

Transgender and non-binary individuals undergoing gender-affirming care may opt for oocyte cryopreservation before procedures that affect fertility.

Individuals with a family history of early menopause may have an interest in fertility preservation to preserve viable eggs that could deteriorate at an earlier onset.

Individuals with ovarian diseases such as polyendocrine metabolic ovarian syndrome (formerly called polycystic ovary syndrome) could opt for this method.

Oocyte cryopreservation is one of many options for individuals undergoing in vitro fertilisation (IVF). In some cases, persons may prefer oocyte cryopreservation over other options, where freezing embryos is the primary procedure.

== Method ==
The egg retrieval process for oocyte cryopreservation is the same as that for IVF (In vitro fertilisation). This process includes one to several weeks of hormone injections that stimulate ovaries to ripen multiple eggs. When the eggs are mature, final maturation induction is performed. The eggs are subsequently removed from the body by transvaginal oocyte retrieval. The procedure is usually conducted under sedation. The eggs are immediately frozen.

The egg is the largest cell in the human body and contains large amounts of water. When the egg is frozen, the ice crystals that form can destroy the integrity of the cell. To prevent this, the egg must be dehydrated before freezing. This is done using cryoprotectants which replace most of the water within the cell and inhibit the formation of ice crystals.

Eggs (oocytes) are frozen using either a controlled rate, a slow-cooling method, or a newer flash-freezing process known as vitrification. Vitrification is much faster but requires higher concentrations of cryoprotectants to be added. The result of vitrification is a solid glass-like cell, free of ice crystals. Vitrification has been developed and successfully applied in IVF treatment with the first live birth following the vitrification of oocytes achieved in 1999. Vitrification eliminates ice formation inside and outside of oocytes on cooling, during cryostorage, and as the oocytes warm. Vitrification is associated with higher survival rates and enhanced development compared to slow-cooling when applied to oocytes in metaphase II. Vitrification has also become the method of choice for pronuclear oocytes, although prospective randomized controlled trials are still lacking.

During the freezing process, the zona pellucida, or shell of the egg, can be modified, preventing fertilization. Thus, when eggs are thawed and pregnancy is desired, a fertilization procedure known as intracytoplasmic sperm injection (ICSI) is performed by an embryologist whereby sperm is injected directly into the egg with a needle rather than allowing sperm to penetrate naturally by placing it around the egg in a dish.

Immature oocytes have been grown until maturation in vitro, but it is not yet clinically available.

== Success rates ==
Early work investigating the percentage of transferred cycles showed lower frozen cycles compared with fresh cycles (approx. 30% and 50%). More recent studies show "fertilization and pregnancy rates are similar to IVF/ICSI (in vitro fertilization/intracytoplasmic sperm injection) with fresh oocytes when [both] vitrified and warmed oocytes are used as part of IVF/ICSI". These studies were completed mostly in young patients.

In a 2013 meta-analysis of more than 2,200 cycles using frozen eggs, scientists found the probability of having a live birth after three cycles was 31.5% for women who froze their eggs at age 25, 25.9% at age 30, 19.3% at age 35, and 14.8% at age 40.

Studies have shown that the rate of birth defects and chromosomal defects when using cryopreserved oocytes is consistent with that of natural conception. According to a review, which included 936 live births between 1986 and 2008 in the United States obtained from 58 cryopreservation studies, the incidence of major structural congenital anomalies was 1.3%. There were no significant differences compared to naturally-conceived infants. Studies have been undertaken by the National Institute For Health and Care Excellence, determining that although there is insufficient data for the ideal number of oocytes required for a reasonable pregnancy rate, an estimate based on mathematical models predicted that yielding approximately 20 oocytes is required to achieve a 75% chance of pregnancy in women younger than 38 years old.

Recent modifications in the protocol regarding cryoprotectant composition, temperature, and storage methods have had a large impact on the technology, and while it is still considered an experimental procedure, it is quickly becoming an option for women. High security sperm straws are widely used in accredited andrology laboratories and IVF clinics for sperm cryopreservation, providing a sterile sealed environment with full patient identification and traceability throughout storage.

Slow freezing traditionally has been the most commonly used method to cryopreserve oocytes and is the method that has resulted in the most babies born from frozen oocytes worldwide. Ultra-rapid freezing or vitrification represents a potential alternative freezing method.

In the fall of 2009, The American Society for Reproductive Medicine (ASRM) issued an opinion on oocyte cryopreservation concluding that the science holds "great promise for applications in oocyte donation and fertility preservation" because recent laboratory modifications have resulted in improved oocyte survival, fertilization, and pregnancy rates from frozen-thawed oocytes in IVF. The ASRM noted that from the limited research performed to date, there does not appear to be an increase in chromosomal abnormalities, birth defects, or developmental deficits in the children born from cryopreserved oocytes. The ASRM recommended that pending further research, oocyte cryopreservation should be introduced into clinical practice on an investigational basis and under the guidance of an Institutional Review Board (IRB). As with any new technology, safety and efficacy must be evaluated and demonstrated through continued research.

In October 2012, the ASRM lifted the experimental label from the technology for women with a medical need, citing success rates in live births, among other findings. However, they also warned against using it only to delay child-bearing.

In 2014, a Cochrane systematic review was published. It compared vitrification (the newest technology) versus slow freezing (the oldest one). Key results of that review showed that the clinical pregnancy rate was almost 4 times higher in the oocyte vitrification group than in the slow-freezing group, with moderate quality of evidence.

Immature oocytes have been grown until maturation in vitro at a 10% survival rate, but no experiment has been performed to fertilize such oocytes.

== Cost ==
The cost of the egg-freezing procedure (without embryo transfer) in the United States, the United Kingdom, and other European countries varies between $5,000 and $12,000. Specifically, in the UK, egg freezing costs range from approximately £3,300 to £3,900 for the procedure, with annual storage fees between £350 and £400. The cost of egg storage in other European countries can vary from $100 to more than $1,000. Provisional health programs do not cover social egg freezing. Furthermore, no provinces provide funding for IVF after social egg freezing.

Medical tourism may offer lower costs compared to performing egg freezing in high-cost countries like the US. Some well-established medical tourism and IVF countries such as the Czech Republic, Ukraine, Greece, and Cyprus offer egg freezing at competitive prices. It is a lower-cost alternative to typical US options for egg freezing. Spain and the Czech Republic are popular destinations for this treatment.

Iranian insurance began to cover insurance incentives for women freezing their eggs in 2024.

== History ==
Cryopreservation itself has always played a central role in assisted reproductive technology. With the first cryopreservation of sperm in 1953 and of embryos twenty-five years later, these techniques have become routine. Dr. Christopher Chen of Singapore reported the world's first pregnancy in 1986 using previously frozen oocytes. This report stood alone for several years followed by studies reporting success rates using frozen eggs to be much lower than those of traditional in vitro fertilization (IVF) techniques using fresh oocytes. Providing the lead to a new direction in cryobiology, Dr. Lilia Kuleshova was the first scientist to achieve vitrification of human oocytes that resulted in a live birth in 1999. Articles published in the journal Fertility and Sterility reported that pregnancy rates using frozen oocytes were comparable to those of cryopreserved embryos and even fresh embryos.

== Elective oocyte cryopreservation ==
Elective oocyte cryopreservation, also known as social egg freezing, is non-essential egg freezing to preserve fertility for delayed child-bearing when natural conception becomes more problematic. The frequency of this procedure has steadily increased since October 2012 when the American Society for Reproductive Medicine (ASRM) lifted the 'experimental' label from the process. There was a spike in interest in 2014 when global corporations Apple and Meta Platforms announced they were going to pay for the procedure of egg freezing as a benefit for their female employees. This announcement was controversial as some women found it empowering and practical, while others viewed the message these companies were sending to women trying to have a successful long-term career and a family as harmful and alienating. A string of "egg-freezing parties" hosted by third-party companies have also helped popularize the concept among young women. Social science research suggests that women use elective egg freezing to disentangle their search for a romantic partner from their plans to have children.

In 2016, then US Secretary of Defense Ash Carter announced that the Department of Defense would cover the cost of freezing sperm or eggs through a pilot program for active duty service members, to preserve their ability to start a family even if they sustain certain combat injuries.

There are still warnings for women using this technology to fall pregnant at an older age as the risk of pregnancy complications increases with a mother's age. However, studies have shown that the risk of congenital abnormalities in babies born from frozen oocytes is not increased further when compared to naturally conceived babies.

== Risks ==
Most risks associated with egg freezing aren't necessarily related to the practice itself, but rather come as consequences to the administration of medications intended to stimulate the ovaries. However, some smaller issues have been linked with the procedure of egg collection.

The main risk associated with the administration of medications to stimulate the ovaries is ovarian hyperstimulation syndrome (OHSS). This is a transient syndrome in which there is increased permeability of the blood vessels, resulting in fluid loss from the vessels into the surrounding tissues. In most cases, the syndrome is mild, with symptoms such as abdominal bloating, mild discomfort, and nausea. In moderate OHSS there is increased abdominal bloating resulting in pain and vomiting. Reduced urine output may occur. Severe OHSS is serious with even further bloating so that the abdomen appears very distended, and thirst and dehydration occur with minimal urine output. There may be shortness of breath and there is an increased risk of DVT and/or pulmonary embolism. Kidney and liver function can be compromised. Hospitalization under specialist care is indicated. There is no treatment for OHSS, supportive care until the symptoms naturally resolve is required. If an hCG trigger has been used with no embryo transfer, OHSS usually resolves in 7–10 days. If an embryo transfer has occurred and pregnancy results, the symptoms may persist for several weeks. Doctors reduce the likelihood of OHSS occurring by decreasing the doses of gonadotropins (FSH) administered, using a GnRH agonist trigger (instead of an hCG trigger), and freezing all embryos for transfer rather than conducting a fresh embryo transfer.

Risks associated with the egg collection procedure relate to bleeding and infection. The collection procedure involves passing a needle through the wall of the vagina into vascular-stimulated ovaries. A small amount of bleeding is inevitable. In rare cases, there is excessive bleeding into the abdomen requiring surgery. Women undergoing the procedure must advise their specialist of all medications, including herbal supplements, they are using so the specialist can assess whether any of these medications will affect the ability of the blood to clot. Concerning infection, provided the woman does not have additional risk factors for infection (suppressed immune system, use of immuno-suppressive medications, or large ovarian endometriomas) the risk of infection is very low.

One additional risk of the ovaries being temporarily increased in size is ovarian torsion. Ovarian torsion occurs when an enlarged ovary twists around on itself, cutting off its blood supply. The condition is excruciatingly painful and requires urgent surgery to prevent the ischemic loss of the ovary.

== See also ==
- Egg donation
- Semen cryopreservation
- In vitro fertilization
