= Christopher Chen =

Singaporean obstetrician and gynaecologist

Christopher Chen is an obstetrician and gynaecologist in Singapore who in 1986 was the first to successfully freeze a human egg which subsequently led to egg banks being started around the world. In 1998, he successfully produced Singapore's first IVF sextuplets.

== Selected publications ==
- Chen, C (April 1986). "Pregnancy after human oocyte cryopreservation". Lancet. 1 (8486): 884–6. doi:10.1016/S0140-6736(86)90989-X. PMID 2870356. S2CID 40583732.
