= Controlled ovarian hyperstimulation =

Medical technique

Controlled ovarian hyperstimulation is a technique used in assisted reproduction involving the use of fertility medications to induce ovulation by multiple ovarian follicles. These multiple follicles can be taken out by oocyte retrieval (egg collection) for use in in vitro fertilisation (IVF), or be given time to ovulate, resulting in superovulation which is the ovulation of a larger-than-normal number of eggs, generally in the sense of at least two. When ovulated follicles are fertilised in vivo, whether by natural or artificial insemination, there is a very high risk of a multiple pregnancy.

In this article, unless otherwise specified, hyperstimulation will refer to hyperstimulation as part of IVF. In contrast, ovulation induction is ovarian stimulation without subsequent IVF, with the aim of developing one or two ovulatory follicles.

== Procedure ==
=== Response prediction ===
Response predictors determine the protocol for ovulation suppression as well as dosage of medication used for hyperstimulation. Response prediction based on ovarian reserve confers substantially higher live birth rates, lower total costs and more safety.

It is commonly agreed not to exclude anyone from their first IVF attempt only on the basis of poor results on response predictors, as the accuracy of these tests can be poor for the prediction of pregnancy.

==== Antral follicle count ====
The response to gonadotropins may be roughly approximated by antral follicle count (AFC), estimated by vaginal ultrasound, which in turn reflects how many primordial follicles there are in reserve in the ovary.

The definition of "poor ovarian response" is the retrieval of less than 4 oocytes following a standard hyperstimulation protocol, that is, following maximal stimulation. (Note: Definition by the European Society of Human Reproduction and Embryology Consensus Conference) On the other hand, the term "hyper response" refers to the retrieval of more than 15 or 20 oocytes following a standard hyperstimulation protocol. The cut-offs used to predict poor responders versus normal versus hyper-responders upon vaginal ultrasonography vary in the literature, with that of likely poor response varying between an AFC under 3 and under 12, largely resulting from various definitions of the size follicles to be called antral ones.

The following table defines antral follicles as those about 2–8 mm in diameter:

Antral follicle count	Classification	Approximate expected response	Risks	Pregnancy rates	Recommendation
Less than 4	Extremely low	Very poor or none	Cancelled cycle expected	0–7% with 1 oocyte	Not attempt IVF
4-7	Low	Possibly/probably poor response	Higher than average rate of IVF cycle cancellation	15%	High doses of gonadotropin likely
8-10	Reduced	Lower than average	Higher than average rate of IVF cycle cancellation	Slightly reduced	
11-14	Normal (but intermediate)	Sometimes low, but usually adequate	Slight increased risk for IVF cycle cancellation	Slightly reduced compared to the "best" group	
15-30	Normal (good)	Excellent	Very low risk for IVF cycle cancellation. Some risk for ovarian overstimulation	Best overall as a group with approx. 35%	Low doses of gonadotropins
More than 30	High	Likely high	Overstimulation and ovarian hyperstimulation syndrome	Very good overall as a group, but potential egg quality issues	Low doses of gonadotropins

The incidence of poor ovarian response in IVF ranges from 10 to 20%. Older poor responders have a lower range of pregnancy rates compared with younger ones (1.5–12.7 versus 13.0–35%, respectively). Also, the other way around, there is a lower prevalence of poor responders among young women compared to those of advancing age, with 50% of women aged 43–44 years being poor responders.

==== Other response predictors ====
- Circulating anti-Müllerian hormone (AMH) can predict excessive and poor response to ovarian stimulation. According to NICE guidelines of in vitro fertilization, an anti-Müllerian hormone level of less than or equal to 5.4 pmol/L (0.8 ng/mL) predicts a low response to ovarian hyperstimulation, while a level greater than or equal to 25.0 pmol/L (3.6 ng/mL) predicts a high response. For predicting an excessive response, AMH has a sensitivity and specificity of 82% and 76%, respectively. Overall it may be superior to AFC and basal FSH. Tailoring the dosage of gonadotrophin administration to AMH level has been shown to reduce the incidence of excessive response and cancelled cycles.
- Elevated basal follicle stimulating hormone (FSH) levels imply a need of more ampoules of gonadotropins for stimulation, and have a higher cancellation rate because of poor response. However, one study came to the result that this method by itself is worse than only AMH by itself, with live birth rate with AMH being 24%, compared with 18% with FSH.
- Advanced maternal age causes decreased success rates in ovarian hyperstimulation. In ovarian hyperstimulation combined with IUI, women aged 38–39 years appear to have reasonable success during the first two cycles, with an overall live birth rate of 6.1% per cycle. However, for women aged ≥40 years, the overall live birth rate is 2.0% per cycle, and there appears to be no benefit after a single cycle of COH/IUI. It is therefore recommended to consider in vitro fertilization after one failed COH/IUI cycle for women aged ≥40 years.
- Body mass index
- Previous hyperstimulation experiences
- Length of menstrual cycles, with shorter cycles being associated with poorer response.
- Previous ovarian surgery.

=== Hyperstimulation medications ===
==== FSH preparations ====
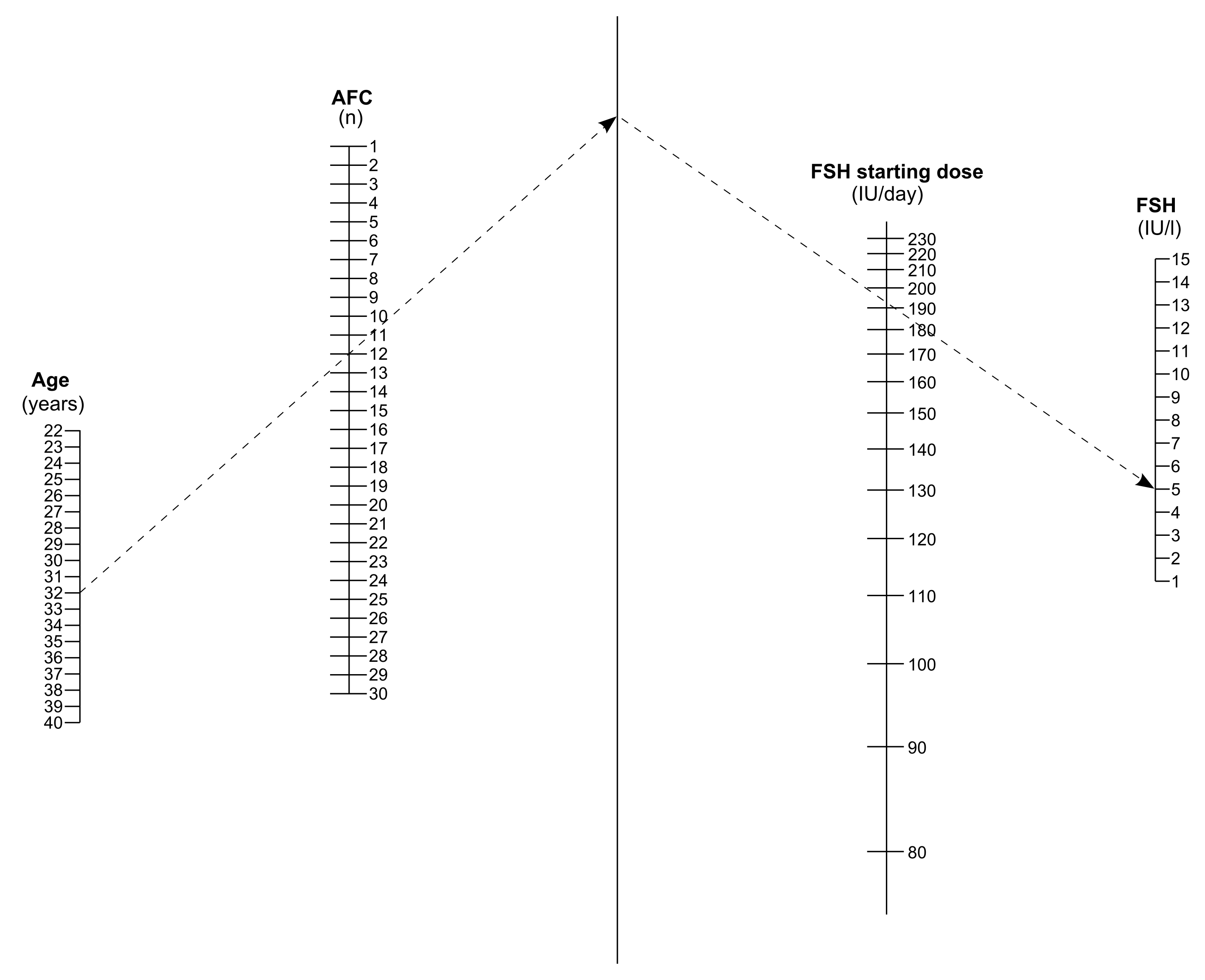
Nomogram for the starting dosage of FSH preparation as estimated from age, antral follicle count (AFC) and endogenous serum FSH taken day 3 of the menstrual cycle. An example is given in the nomogram, wherein an age of 32 years and an AFC of 12 gives a point on the middle line that, when continued to an FSH of 5 IU/L, results in a starting FSH dosage of almost 200 IU/L.

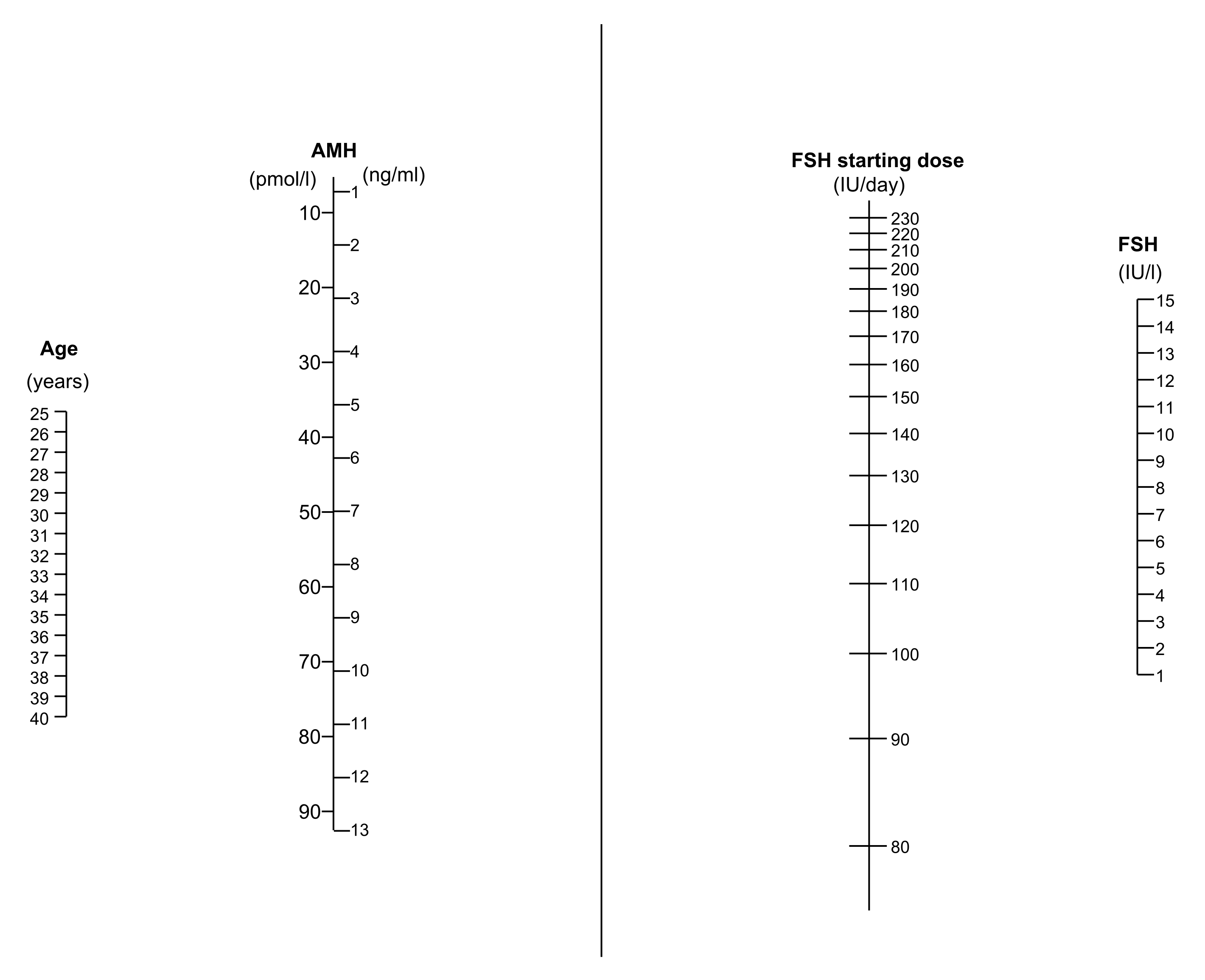
Nomogram for the starting dosage of FSH as estimated from age, anti-Müllerian hormone (AMH) and endogenous serum FSH taken day 3 of the menstrual cycle (same as previous nomogram but with AMH instead of AFC)

In most patients, injectable gonadotropin preparations are used, usually FSH preparations. The clinical choice of gonadotrophin should depend on availability, convenience and costs. The optimal dosage is mainly a trade-off between the pregnancy rate and risk of ovarian hyperstimulation syndrome. A meta-analysis came to the result that the optimal daily recombinant FSH stimulation dose is 150 IU/day in presumed normal responders younger than 39 years undergoing IVF. Compared with higher doses, this dose is associated with a slightly lower oocyte yield, but similar pregnancy rates and embryo cryopreservation rates. For women predicted to have a poor response, there may not be any benefit to start at a higher FSH dosage than 150 IU per day.

When used in medium dosage, a long-acting FSH preparation has the same outcome in regard to live birth rate and risk of ovarian hyperstimulation syndrome as compared to daily FSH. A long-acting FSH preparation may cause decreased live birth rates compared to daily FSH when using low dosages (60 to 120 μg of corifollitropin alfa).

Recombinant FSH (rFSH) appears to be equally effective in terms of live birth rate compared to any of the other types of gonadotropin preparations irrespective of the protocol used for ovulation suppression.

Typically, approximately 8–12 days of injections are necessary.

==== Alternatives and complements to FSH ====
Administering recombinant hCG in addition to an FSH-preparation has no significant beneficial effect. The hCG is the FSH extracted from the urine in menopausical women.

Clomifene, in addition to gonadotropins, may make little or no difference to the live birth rate but may lower the probability of ovarian hyperstimulation syndrome. A systematic review showed that using clomifene citrate in addition to low dose gonadotropin (in a GnRH antagonist protocol as described in the following section) resulted in a trend towards better pregnancy rates and a greater number of oocytes retrieved when compared with a standard high-dose FSH regime. Such a protocol avails for using lower dosages of FSH-preparations, conferring lower costs per cycle, being particularly useful in cases where cost is a major limiting factor.

Recombinant luteinizing hormone (rLH) in addition to FSH probably increases pregnancy rates, but it is not certain if the live birth rate is also increased. Using low dose human chorionic gonadotropin (hCG) to replace FSH during the late follicular phase in women undergoing hyperstimulation as part of IVF may make little or no difference to pregnancy rates, and possibly leads to in an equivalent number of oocytes retrieved, but with less expenditure of FSH. Before ovarian stimulation with antagonist protocols, pretreatment with combined oral contraceptive pills probably reduces the rate of live birth or ongoing pregnancy, while it is uncertain whether pretreatment with progesterone only has any effect on live birth or ongoing pregnancy rates. For other stimulation protocols, the evidence around pretreatment with combined oral contraceptives and progesterone only is uncertain.

Findings are conflicting, but metformin treatment as a complement in IVF cycles may reduce the risk of ovarian hyperstimulation syndrome and increase live birth rates.

=== Suppression of spontaneous ovulation ===
When used in conjunction with in vitro fertilization (IVF), controlled ovarian hyperstimulation confers a need to avoid spontaneous ovulation, since oocyte retrieval of the mature egg from the fallopian tube or uterus is much harder than from the ovarian follicle. The main regimens to achieve ovulation suppression are:

- GnRH agonist administration given continuously before starting the gonadotropin hyperstimulation regimen. Physiologically, GnRH agonists are normally released in a cyclical fashion in the body to increase normal gonadotropin release, including luteinizing hormone that triggers ovulation, but continuous exogenous administration of GnRH agonists has the opposite effect of causing cessation of physiological gonadotropin production in the body.
- GnRH antagonist administration, which is typically administered in the mid-follicular phase in stimulated cycles after administration of gonadotropins and prior to triggering final maturation of oocytes. The GnRH antagonists that are currently licensed for use in fertility treatment are cetrorelix and ganirelix. In GnRH antagonist cycles, hyperstimulation medication is typically started on the second or third day of a previous natural menstruation.

==== Agonist vs antagonist ====
Regarding pregnancy rate, choosing GnRH agonist protocol for a cycle is approximately as efficient as choosing GnRH antagonist protocol. Still, the two protocols differ on a number of aspects:

- Practically, the timing of the hyperstimulation and the day of oocyte retrieval in a GnRH antagonist protocol needs to be timed after the spontaneous initiation of the previous menstrual cycle, while the schedule can be started at a time to meet practical needs in a GnRH agonist protocol.
- The start of GnRH agonist administration can range from a long protocol of 14 to 18 days prior to gonadotropin administration, to a short protocol where it is started by the time of gonadotropin administration. Its duration can then be from 3 days to final maturation induction. A long GnRH agonist protocol has been associated with a higher pregnancy rate, but there is insufficient evidence for any higher live birth rate, compared to a short GnRH agonist protocol.
  For GnRH antagonists, administration from the day after the onset of menstruation has been associated with a higher number of mature oocytes compared to starting when follicle diameter reaches 12 mm.
- Regarding time per cycle, on the other hand, the cycle duration using GnRH antagonist protocol is typically substantially shorter than one using a standard long GnRH agonist protocol, potentially resulting in a higher number of cycles in any given time period, which is beneficial for women with more limited time to become pregnant.
- Regarding antral follicle count, with the GnRH antagonist protocol initial follicular recruitment and selection is undertaken by endogenous endocrine factors prior to starting the exogenous hyperstimulation. This results in a smaller number of growing follicles when compared with the standard long GnRH agonist protocol. This is an advantage in women expected to be high responders, thereby decreasing the risk of ovarian hyperstimulation syndrome.
- Regarding subsequent final maturation induction, usage of GnRH agonist protocol necessitates subsequent usage of human chorionic gonadotropin (HCG or hCG) for this purpose, while usage of GnRH antagonist protocol also avails for subsequently using a GnRH agonist for final oocyte maturation. Using a GnRH agonist for final oocyte maturation rather than hCG results in an elimination of the risk of ovarian hyperstimulation syndrome, while having a delivery rate after IVF of approximately 6% less.
- Unlike the agonist protocol, the antagonist protocol is rapidly reversible because the GnRH receptors are merely blocked but functional. Administration of enough GnRH agonist to compete with the antagonist will result in release of FSH and LH which subsequently increases the release of Estrogen.
- In GnRH agonist protocol, there is a risk of estrogen deprivation symptoms, e.g. hot flushes, vagina dryness. This is because the pituitary gonadotropic cells are desensitized, i.e. the number of receptors have reduced. Whereas in the antagonist protocol there are no deprivation symptoms because its administration occurs after FSH stimulation has been done therefore there is increased level of estrogen.

Thus, in short, a GnRH antagonist protocol may be harder to schedule timewise but has shorter cycle lengths and less (or even eliminated) risk of ovarian hyperstimulation syndrome.

GnRH antagonist protocol has overall better results for expected poor and hyper-responders; A study of these protocols in women undergoing their first IVF and having a poor predicted response (by an AMH level below 5 pmol/L by DSL assay), using the GnRH antagonist protocol was associated with a substantial drop in cycle cancellation (odds ratio 0.20) and required fewer days of gonadotrophin stimulation (10 days versus 14 days) compared to GnRH agonist protocol. Using GnRH antagonist protocol in high responders has been associated with significantly higher clinical pregnancy rates (62 versus 32%).

The pregnancy rate is probably higher with long-course GnRH protocols compared to short or ultra-short GnRH agonist protocols. There is no evidence that stopping or reducing GnRH agonist administration at the start of gonadotropin administration results in a decrease in pregnancy rate.

=== Monitoring ===
There is a concomitant monitoring, including frequently checking the estradiol level and, by means of gynecologic ultrasonography, follicular growth. A Cochrane review (updated in 2021) found no difference between cycle monitoring by ultrasound (TVUS) plus serum estradiol compared to monitoring by ultrasound only relative to pregnancy rates and the incidence of ovarian hyperstimulation syndrome (OHSS).

Tracking or supervising the maturation of follicles is performed in order to timely schedule oocyte retrieval. Two-dimensional ultrasound is conventionally used. Automated follicle tracking does not appear to improve the clinical outcome of assisted reproduction treatment.

=== Retrieval ===
When used in conjunction with IVF, ovarian hyperstimulation may be followed by final maturation of oocytes, using human chorionic gonadotropin (hCG), or a GnRH agonist if a GnRH antagonist protocol is used for ovulation suppression. A transvaginal oocyte retrieval is then performed just prior to when the follicles would rupture.

It is uncertain if coasting, which is ovarian hyperstimulation without induction of final maturation, reduces the risk of OHSS.

== Risks ==
Perhaps the greatest risk associated with controlled ovarian hyperstimulation is ovarian hyperstimulation syndrome (OHSS). OHSS occurs when, following a "trigger" injection for final oocyte maturation, excessive VEGF production by numerous follicles acts systemically. This can result in a shift of fluid from the bloodstream to "third spaces", including the belly and the space around the lungs. This can make it difficult and painful to breathe or move, and in extremely rare cases can be fatal. Severe cases often require hospitalization, removal of fluid from the abdomen, and replacement of fluid in the blood. OHSS is most prevalent in very high responders, almost always those with more than 20 developing ovarian follicles, who are triggered with hCG. One means of greatly reducing OHSS risk is to trigger with GnRH agonist instead of hCG. This results in a surge of LH from the pituitary, the same hormone that matures the eggs in natural cycles. LH has a much shorter half-life than hCG, so that nearly all of the LH is cleared by the time of egg collection, or about 36 hours after trigger. Any developing signs of OHSS will typically vanish at that point. However, in rare cases, severe OHSS can continue to develop. Reduced success rates have been reported in fresh embryo transfers when the agonist trigger is used without hCG, so that most centers will freeze all embryos in cycles triggered only with the agonist.

Ovarian hyperstimulation does not seem to be associated with an elevated risk of cervical cancer, nor with ovarian cancer or endometrial cancer when neutralizing the confounder of infertility itself. Also, it does not seem to impact increased risk for breast cancer.

== Alternatives ==
- Ovulation induction is ovarian stimulation without subsequent IVF, with the aim of developing one or two ovulatory follicles (the maximum number before recommending sexual abstinence in such treatments). It is cheaper and easier to perform than controlled ovarian hyperstimulation, and is therefore the preferred initial stimulation protocol in menstrual disorders including anovulation and oligoovulation.
- In vitro maturation is letting ovarian follicles mature in vitro, and with this technique ovarian hyperstimulation is not essential. Rather, oocytes can mature outside the body prior to fertilisation by IVF. Hence, gonadotropins does not need to be injected in the body, or at least a lower dose may be injected. However, there is still not enough evidence to prove the effectiveness and safety of the technique.
