= Final maturation induction =

Induction of final maturation of oocytes is a procedure that is usually performed as part of controlled ovarian hyperstimulation to render the oocytes fully developed and, thereby resulting in optimal pregnancy chances. It is basically a replacement for the luteinizing hormone (LH) surge whose effects include final maturation in natural menstrual cycles.

The main medications used for induction of final maturation are human chorionic gonadotropin (hCG) and GnRH agonist. In fresh (rather than frozen) autologous cycles of in vitro fertilization, final oocyte maturation triggering with GnRH agonist instead of hCG decreases the risk of ovarian hyperstimulation syndrome but decreases the live birth rate. In cycles followed by oocyte donation, use of GnRH agonists instead of hCG decreases the risk of ovarian hyperstimulation syndrome with no evidence of a difference in live birth rate.

== Usage with ovulation ==
Induction of final maturation also initiates the mechanisms that eventually result in ovulation, and thereby makes the oocytes destined to undergo ovulation unless artificial oocyte retrieval is performed first. Therefore, induction of final maturation is also called triggering oocyte release from the ovary, and the administration of pharmaceutical drugs to induce final maturation is colloquially called giving a "trigger shot", even if the plan is to perform artificial oocyte retrieval before ovulation.

Administration of a drug to trigger oocyte release without oocyte retrieval results in a predictable time of ovulation, with the interval from drug administration to ovulation depending on the type of drug. This avails for sexual intercourse or intrauterine insemination (IUI) to conveniently be scheduled at ovulation, the most likely time to achieve pregnancy.

In ovulation induction, using clomifene for intended conception by sexual intercourse, however, triggering oocyte release has been shown to decrease pregnancy chances compared to frequent monitoring with LH surge tests. Therefore, in such cases, triggering oocyte release is best reserved for women who require IUI and in whom LH monitoring proves difficult or unreliable. It may also be used when LH monitoring hasn't shown an LH surge by cycle day 18 (where cycle day 1 is the first day of the preceding menstruation) and there is an ovarian follicle of over 20 mm in size.

== Usage with artificial oocyte retrieval ==
In in vitro fertilization (IVF), induction of final maturation avails for egg retrieval when the eggs are fully mature.

In IVF, final maturation induction is preceded by controlled ovarian hyperstimulation. It is suggested that there should be a size of ovarian follicles of at least 15 mm, and serum estradiol level of 0.49 nmol/L before commencing final maturation induction. There are better prospects at a follicle size of 18 mm and serum estradiol level of 0.91 nmol/L.

== Medications ==
Medications used for final maturation and/or release of oocytes include:

- Human chorionic gonadotropin (HCG or hCG) in a low dose, which may be injected after completed ovarian stimulation. Final maturation with hCG is also termed hCG priming. Ovulation will occur between 38 and 40 hours after a single HCG injection. It is also used in in vitro fertilization, where it makes the follicles perform their final maturation. A transvaginal oocyte retrieval is then performed at a time usually between 34 and 36 hours after hCG injection, that is, shortly before when the follicles would rupture. A retrieval at 36 hours after final maturation induction appears to result in optimal embryo quality and pregnancy outcomes. HCG injection confers a risk of ovarian hyperstimulation syndrome.
- Recombinant luteinizing hormone (rLH), recombinant HCG (rHCG) and urine-derived hCG (uHCG) are equally effective in achieving final follicular maturation in IVF with regards to pregnancy rates and risk of ovarian hyperstimulation syndrome. Therefore, urine-derived hCG (uHCG) is regarded as the best choice for final oocyte maturation triggering in IVF due to availability and cost.
- GnRH agonist, which necessitates using a GnRH antagonist protocol for suppression of ovulation during ovarian hyperstimulation, because using GnRH agonist for that purpose as well inactivates the axis for which it is intended to work for final maturation induction.

=== HCG versus GnRH agonist ===
Final maturation induction using GnRH agonist results in a substantial decrease in the risk of ovarian hyperstimulation syndrome (OHSS). A Cochrane review estimated that using GnRH agonist instead of hCG in IVF decreases the risk of mild, moderate or severe OHSS with an odds ratio of approximately 0.15. The review estimated that, for a woman with a 5% risk of mild, moderate or severe OHSS with the use of HCG, the risk of OHSS with the use of a GnRH agonist would be between 0 and 2%.

However, using GnRH agonist has a lower live birth rate than when using hCG in autologous oocyte transfers (rather than ones using oocyte donation). A Cochrane review of autologous oocyte transfers estimated that GnRH agonist, compared to hCG, gives an odds ratio of pregnancy of approximately 0.47. It estimated that, for a woman with a 31% chance of achieving live birth with the use of hCG, the chance of a live birth with the use of an GnRH agonist would be between 12% and 24%. Likewise, using GnRH agonist instead of hCG was associated with a lower ongoing pregnancy rate (pregnancy beyond 12 weeks) than was seen with HCG (odds ratio 0.70) and a higher rate of early (less than 12 weeks) miscarriage (odds ratio 1.74). However, a higher pregnancy rate when using hCG is only found in those receiving luteal support without luteinizing hormone activity (such as progesterone or progestin).

Final maturation induction using a GnRH agonist is recommended in women with cancer undergoing fertility preservation, because ovarian hyperstimulation syndrome is associated with an increased risk of arterial thrombotic events such as stroke, myocardial infarction and peripheral arterial embolism, and this risk can add to an already increased risk caused by the cancer.

Using hCG versus GnRH agonist has no effect on the risk of multiple pregnancy. Also, no difference has been found between the regimens regarding live birth rate or ongoing pregnancy rate when the controlled ovarian hyperstimulation was followed by oocyte donation.
