= Transvaginal oocyte retrieval =

Technique used in in vitro fertilization

Transvaginal oocyte retrieval (TVOR), also referred to as oocyte retrieval (OCR), is a technique used in in vitro fertilization (IVF) in order to remove oocytes from an ovary, enabling fertilization outside the body. Transvaginal oocyte retrieval is more properly referred to as transvaginal ovum retrieval when the oocytes have matured into ova, as is normally the case in IVF. It can also be performed for egg donation, oocyte cryopreservation and other assisted reproduction technology such as ICSI.

== Procedure ==
Under ultrasound guidance, the operator inserts a 16.5 gauge × 11.8″ (1.6 mm × 300 mm outer diameter) needle through the vaginal wall and into an ovarian follicle, taking care not to injure nearby organs and blood vessels. The other end of the needle is attached to a suction device. Once the follicle is entered, suction is carefully applied to aspirate follicular fluid containing cellular material, including the oocyte. The suction device must maintain a pressure of -140 mmHg (necessary to aspirate rapidly, but not enough to damage the follicles) and a temperature of approximately 37 °C. The follicular fluid is delivered to a technician in the IVF laboratory to identify and quantify the ova. Once the ovarian follicles have been aspirated on one ovary, the needle is withdrawn and the procedure is repeated on the other ovary. It is not unusual to remove 20 oocytes as patients are generally hyperstimulated in advance of this procedure. After completion, the needle is withdrawn, and hemostasis is achieved. The procedure usually lasts 10–20 minutes. Once the extraction is done, the sample is analyzed in the microscope to select and carry out the oocyte decumulation, a process where the granulosa cells surrounding the oocyte are removed.

Initially performed using transabdominal ultrasonography, TVOR is currently performed with a transvaginal ultrasound transducer with an attached needle. TVOR is performed in an operating room or a physician's office, with the subject in the lithotomy position. TVOR is usually performed under procedural sedation, general anesthesia, paracervical block, or sometimes spinal anesthesia. Local anesthesia is not typically used because local anesthetic agents interfere with follicular cleavage and the technique requires multiple needle punctures.

This technique must be done very delicately, without stimulating the uterus, so that contractions do not occur. Minimizing patient anxiety is desirable to favor efficacy.

=== Adjunctive procedures ===
Follicular flushing has not been found to increase pregnancy rates, nor result in an increase in oocyte yield. On the other hand, it requires a significantly longer operative time and more analgesia.

Seminal fluid contains several proteins that interact with epithelial cells of the cervix and uterus, inducing active gestational immune tolerance. There are significantly improved outcomes when patients are exposed to seminal plasma around the time of oocyte retrieval, with statistical significance for clinical pregnancy, but not for ongoing pregnancy or live birth rates with the limited data available.

== Timing ==
TVOR is typically performed after ovarian hyperstimulation, where oocytes are pharmacologically stimulated to mature. When the ovarian follicles have reached a certain degree of development, induction of final oocyte maturation is performed, generally by an intramuscular or subcutaneous injection of human chorionic gonadotropin (hCG). TVOR is typically performed 34–36 hours after hCG injection, when the eggs are fully mature but just prior to rupture of the follicles.

== Complications ==
Injection of hCG as a trigger for ovulation confers a risk of ovarian hyperstimulation syndrome, especially in patients with polyendocrine metabolic ovarian syndrome (PMOS) who have been hyperstimulated during previous assisted reproduction cycles.

Complications of TVOR include injury to pelvic organs, hemorrhage, and infection. Occurring more often in lean patients with PMOS, ovarian hemorrhage after TVOR is a potentially catastrophic and not so rare complication. Additional complications may result from the administration of intravenous sedation or general anesthesia. These include asphyxia caused by airway obstruction, apnea, hypotension, and pulmonary aspiration of stomach contents.

Propofol-based anesthetic techniques result in significant concentrations of propofol in follicular fluid. As propofol has been shown to have deleterious effects on oocyte fertilization (in a mouse model), some authors have suggested that the dose of propofol administered during anesthesia should be limited, and also that the retrieved oocytes should be washed free of propofol. Anecdotal evidence suggests that certain airborne chemical contaminants and particles, especially volatile organic compounds (VOC), may be toxic to and impair the growth and development of embryos if present in sufficient concentrations in the ambient atmosphere of an IVF incubator.

Endometriosis seems to cause a challenge for TVOR that may have reflection on individual surgeon's performance rates for the procedure, independently from the diameter of a pre-existing ovarian endometrioma (OMA) or ovarian adhesions. Obesity is another factor that may present a challenge for the procedure.

== History ==
This technique was first developed by Pierre Dellenbach and colleagues in Strasbourg, France, and reported in 1984. Steptoe and Edwards used laparoscopy to recover oocytes when IVF was introduced, and laparoscopy was the major method of oocyte recovery until TVOR was introduced.
