= Ovulation induction =

Stimulation of ovulation by medication

- Specialty: Reproductive endocrinology and infertility, obstetrics
- MeSH: D010062

Ovulation induction is the stimulation of ovulation by medication. It is usually used in the sense of stimulation of the development of ovarian follicles to reverse anovulation or oligoovulation.

== Scope ==
The term ovulation induction can potentially also be used for:

- Final maturation induction, in the sense of triggering oocyte release from relatively mature ovarian follicles during late follicular phase. In any case, ovarian stimulation (in the sense of stimulating the development of oocytes) is often used in conjunction with triggering oocyte release, such as for proper timing of artificial insemination.
- Controlled ovarian hyperstimulation (stimulating the development of multiple follicles of the ovaries in one single cycle), has also appeared in the scope of ovulation induction. Controlled ovarian hyperstimulation is generally part of in vitro fertilization, and the aim is generally to develop multiple follicles (optimally between 11 and 14 antral follicles measuring 2–8 mm in diameter), followed by transvaginal oocyte retrieval, co-incubation, followed by embryo transfer of a maximum of two embryos at a time.
- The treatment for an underlying disease in cases where anovulation or oligovulation is secondary that disease (such as endocrine disease). For example, weight loss results in significant improvement in pregnancy and ovulation rates in anovulatory obese women.

However, this article focuses on medical ovarian stimulation, during early to mid-follicular phase, without subsequent in vitro fertilization, with the aim of developing one or two ovulatory follicles (the maximum number before recommending sexual abstinence).

== Indications ==
Ovulation induction helps reversing anovulation or oligoovulation, that is, helping women who do not ovulate on their own regularly, such as those with polyendocrine metabolic ovarian syndrome (PMOS).

== Regimen alternatives ==
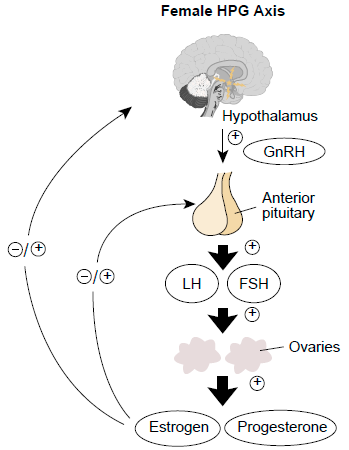
Hypothalamic–pituitary–gonadal axis in females, with estrogen exerting mainly negative feedback on follicle-stimulating hormone secretion from the pituitary gland

The main alternatives for ovulation induction medications are:

- Antiestrogen, causing an inhibition of the negative feedback of estrogen on the pituitary gland, resulting in an increase in secretion of follicle-stimulating hormone. Medications in use for this effect are mainly clomifene citrate and tamoxifen (both being selective estrogen-receptor modulators), as well as letrozole (an aromatase inhibitor).
- Follicle-stimulating hormone, directly stimulating the ovaries. In women with anovulation, it may be an alternative after 7 to 12 attempted cycles of antiestrogens (as evidenced by clomifene citrate), since the latter ones are less expensive and more easy to control.

=== Antiestrogens ===
==== Clomifene citrate ====
Clomifene citrate (Clomid is a common brand name) is the medication which is most commonly used to treat anovulation. It is a selective estrogen-receptor modulator, affecting the hypothalamic–pituitary–gonadal axis to respond as if there was an estrogen deficit in the body, in effect increasing the production of follicle-stimulating hormone. It is relatively easy and convenient to use. Clomifene appears to inhibit estrogen receptors in hypothalamus, thereby inhibiting negative feedback of estrogen on production of follicle-stimulating hormone. It may also result in direct stimulation of the hypothalamic–pituitary axis. It also has an effect on cervical mucus quality and uterine mucosa, which might affect sperm penetration and survival, hence its early administration during the menstrual cycle. Clomifene citrate is a very efficient ovulation inductor, and has a success rate of 67%. Nevertheless, it only has a 37% success rate in inducing pregnancy. This difference may be due to the anti-estrogenic effect which clomifene citrate has on the endometrium, cervical mucus, uterine blood flow, as well as the resulting decrease in the motility of the fallopian tubes and the maturation of the oocytes.

==== Letrozole ====
Letrozole has been used for ovarian stimulation by fertility doctors since 2001 because it has fewer side-effects than clomiphene and less chance of multiple gestation. A study of 150 babies following treatment with letrozole or letrozole and follicle-stimulating hormone presented at the American Society of Reproductive Medicine 2005 Conference found no difference in overall abnormalities but did find a significantly higher rate of locomotor and cardiac abnormalities among the group having taken letrozole compared to natural conception. A larger, follow-up study with 911 babies compared those born following treatment with letrozole to those born following treatment with clomiphene. That study also found no significant difference in the rate of overall abnormalities, but found that congenital cardiac anomalies was significantly higher in the clomiphene group compared to the letrozole group.

Dosage is generally 2.5 to 7.5 mg daily over 5 days. A higher dose of up to 12.5 mg per day results in increased follicular growth and a higher number of predicted ovulations, without a detrimental effect on endometrial thickness, and is considered in those who do not respond adequately to a lower dose.

==== Tamoxifen ====
Tamoxifen affects estrogen receptors in a similar fashion as clomifene citrate. It is often used in the prevention and treatment of breast cancer. It can therefore also be used to treat patients that have a reaction to clomifene citrate.

=== Follicle-stimulating hormone ===
Preparations of follicle-stimulating hormone mainly include those derived from the urine of menopausal women, as well as recombinant preparations. The recombinant preparations are more pure and more easily administered, but they are more expensive. The urinary preparations are equally effective and less expensive, but are not as convenient to administer as they are available in vials versus injection pens.

=== Gonadotropin-releasing hormone pump ===
The gonadotropin-releasing hormone pump is used to release doses in a pulsatile fashion. This hormone is synthesised by the hypothalamus and induces the secretion of follicle-stimulating hormone by the pituitary gland. Gonadotropin-releasing hormone must be delivered in a pulsatile fashion to imitate the random secretion of the hypothalamus in order to stimulate the pituitary into secreting luteinizing hormone and follicle-stimulating hormone. The gonadotropin-releasing hormone pump is the size of a cigarette box and has a small catheter. Unlike other treatments, using the gonadotropin-releasing hormone pump usually does not result in multiple pregnancies. Filicori from the University of Bologna suggests that this might be because gonadotrophins are absent when the treatment is initiated, and therefore the hormones released by the pituitary (luteinizing hormone and follicle-stimulating hormone) can still take part in the retro-control of gonadotrophin secretion, mimicking the natural cycle. This treatment can also be used for underweight and/or anorexic patients; it has also been used in certain cases of hyperprolactinemia.

=== National and regional usage ===
In the Nordic countries, letrozole is practically the standard initial regimen used for ovulation induction, since no formulation of clomifene is registered for use there.

India banned the usage of letrozole in 2011, citing potential risks to infants. In 2012, an Indian parliamentary committee said that the drug controller office colluded with letrozole's makers to approve the drug for infertility in India.

== Technique ==
Although there are many possible additional diagnostic and interventional techniques, protocols for ovulation induction generally consist of:

- Determining the first day of the last menstruation, which is termed day 1. In case of amenorrhea, a period can be induced by intake of an oral progestin for 10 days.
- Daily administration of the ovulation induction regimen, starting on day 3, 4, or 5, and it is usually taken for 5 days.
- Sexual intercourse or artificial insemination by the time of ovulation.

=== Ultrasonography ===
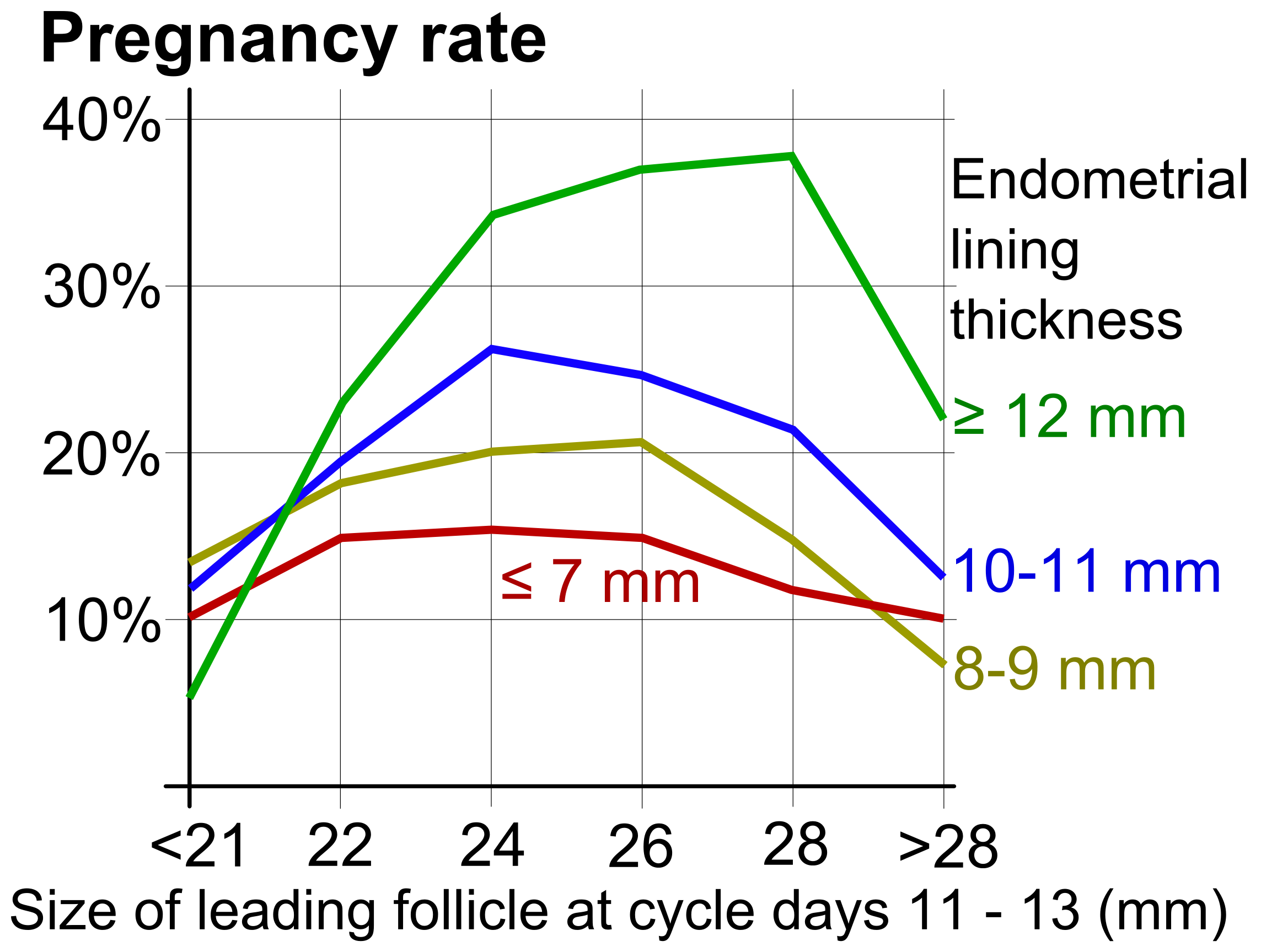
Pregnancy rates in ovulation induction when using antiestrogens, as functions of the size of the leading follicle as measured by transvaginal ultrasonography at days 11 - 13 (bottom scale), as well as the thickness of the endometrial lining (4 different curves)

During ovulation induction, it is recommended to start at a low dose and monitor the ovarian response with transvaginal ultrasound, including discernment of the number of developing follicles. Initial exam is most commonly started 4–6 days after last pill. Serial transvaginal ultrasound can reveal the size and number of developing follicles. It can also provide presumptive evidence of ovulation such as sudden collapse of the preovulatory follicle, and an increase in fluid volume in the rectouterine pouch. After ovulation, it may reveal signs of luteinization such as loss of clearly defined follicular margins and appearance of internal echoes.

==== Supernumerary follicles ====
A cycle with supernumerary follicles is usually defined as one where there are more than two follicles >16 mm in diameter. It is generally recommended to have such cycles cancelled because of the risk of multiple pregnancy (see also the "Risks and side effects" section below). In cancelled cycles, the woman or couple should be warned of the risks in case of supernumerary follicles, and should avoid sexual intercourse or use contraception until the next menstruation. Induction of final maturation (such as done with hCG) may need to be withheld because of increased risk of ovarian hyperstimulation syndrome. The starting dose of the inducing drug should be reduced in the next cycle.

Alternatives to cancelling a cycle are mainly:

- Aspiration of supernumerary follicles until one or two remain.
- Converting the protocol to IVF treatment with embryo transfer of up to two embryos only.
- Selective fetal reduction. This alternative confers a high risk of complications.
- Proceeding with any multiple pregnancy without fetal reduction, with the ensuing risk of complications. This alternative is not recommended.

=== Lab tests ===
The following laboratory tests may be used to monitor induced cycles:

- Serum estradiol levels, starting 4–6 days after last pill
- Adequacy of luteinizing hormone surge LH surge by urine tests 3 to 4 days after last clomifene pill
- Post-coital test 1–3 days before ovulation to check whether there are at least 5 progressive sperm per HPF
- Mid-luteal progesterone, with at least 10 ng/ml 7–9 days after ovulation being regarded as adequate.

=== Final maturation induction ===
Final maturation induction and release, such as by human chorionic gonadotropin (HCG or hCG) or recombinant luteinizing hormone, results in a predictable time of ovulation, with the interval from drug administration to ovulation depending on the type of drug. This avails for sexual intercourse or intrauterine insemination to conveniently be scheduled at ovulation, the most likely time to achieve pregnancy.

As evidenced by clomifene-induced cycles, however, triggering oocyte release has been shown to decrease pregnancy chances compared to frequent monitoring with LH surge tests. Therefore, in such cases, triggering oocyte release is best reserved for women who require intrauterine insemination and in whom luteinizing hormone monitoring proves difficult or unreliable. It may also be used when luteinizing hormone monitoring has no shown an luteinizing hormone surge by cycle day 18 (where cycle day 1 is the first day of the preceding menstruation) and there is an ovarian follicle of over 20 mm in size.

=== Repeat cycles ===
Ovulation induction can be repeated every menstrual cycle. For clomifene, the dosage may be increased by 50-mg increments in subsequent cycles until ovulation is achieved. However, at a dosage of 200 mg, further increments are unlikely to increase pregnancy chances.

It is not recommended by the manufacturer of clomifene to use it for more than 6 consecutive cycles. In women with anovulation, 7–12 attempted cycles of pituitary feedback regimens (as evidenced by clomifene citrate) are recommended before switching to gonadotrophins, since the latter ones are more expensive and less easy to control.

It is no longer recommended to perform an ultrasound examination to exclude any significant residual ovarian enlargement before each new treatment cycle.

== Risks and side effects ==
Ultrasound and regular hormone checks mitigate risks throughout the process. However, there are still some risks with the procedure.

Ovarian hyperstimulation syndrome occurs in 5–10% of cases. Symptoms depend on whether the case is mild, moderate, or severe, and can range from bloating and nausea, through to shortness of breathe, pleural effusion, and excessive weight gain (more than 2 pounds per day).

=== Multiple pregnancy ===
There is also the risk that more than one egg is produced, leading to twins or triplets. Women with polyendocrine metabolic ovarian syndrome (PMOS) may be particularly at risk. Multiple pregnancy occurs in approximately 15–20% of cases following cycles induced with gonadotrophins such as human menopausal gonadotropin and follicle-stimulating hormone. The risks associated with multiple pregnancy are much higher than singleton pregnancy; incidence of perinatal death is seven times higher in triplet births and five times higher in twin births than the risks associated with a singleton pregnancy. It is therefore important to adapt the treatment to each individual patient. If more than one or two ovulatory follicles are detected on ultrasonography, sexual abstinence is recommended.

== Alternatives ==
Other treatments for anovulation are mainly:

- Weight loss: Obese women are less fertile in both natural and ovulation induction cycles and have higher rates of miscarriage than their counterparts of normal weight; they also require higher doses of ovulation-inducing agents. Weight loss results in significant improvement in pregnancy and ovulation rates in such patients.
- In vitro fertilization, including controlled ovarian hyperstimulation.
- In vitro maturation is letting ovarian follicles mature in vitro, and this technique can potentially be an alternative both to anovulation reversal and oocyte release triggering. Rather, oocytes can mature outside the body, such as prior to IVF. Hence, no (or at least a lower dose of) gonadotropins have to be injected in the body. However, there still isn't enough evidence to prove the effectiveness and security of the technique.
- Laparoscopic ovarian drilling: This 'update' of ovarian wedge resection employs a unipolar coagulating current or puncture of the ovarian surface with a laser in four to ten places to a depth of 4±10 mm on each ovary.
