= Vaginal ultrasonography =

Type of medical ultrasonography

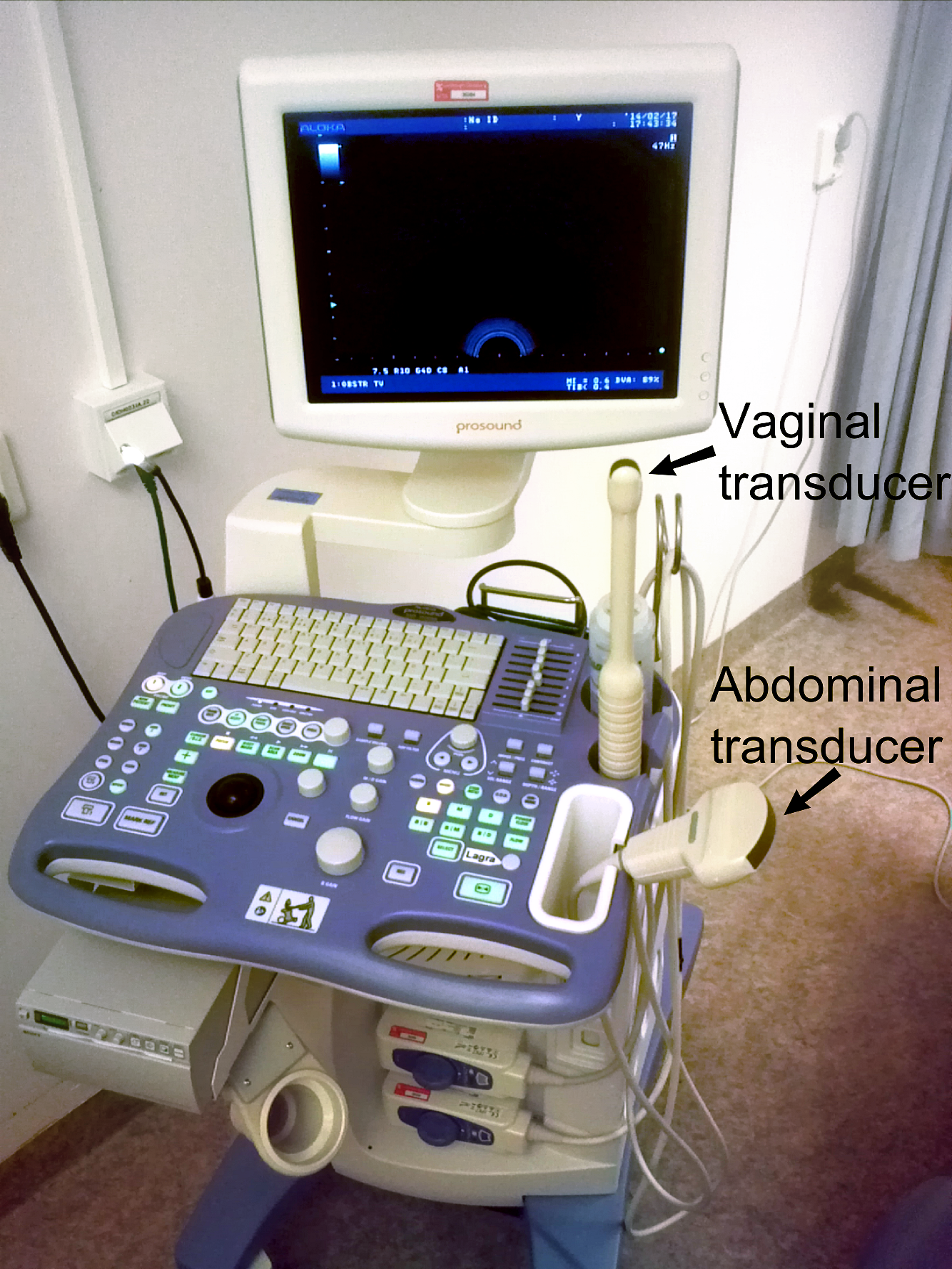
Device for both vaginal and abdominal ultrasonography

Vaginal ultrasonography is a medical ultrasonography that applies an ultrasound transducer (or "probe") in the vagina to visualize organs within the pelvic cavity. It is also called transvaginal ultrasonography because the ultrasound waves go across the vaginal wall to study tissues beyond it.

== Uses ==
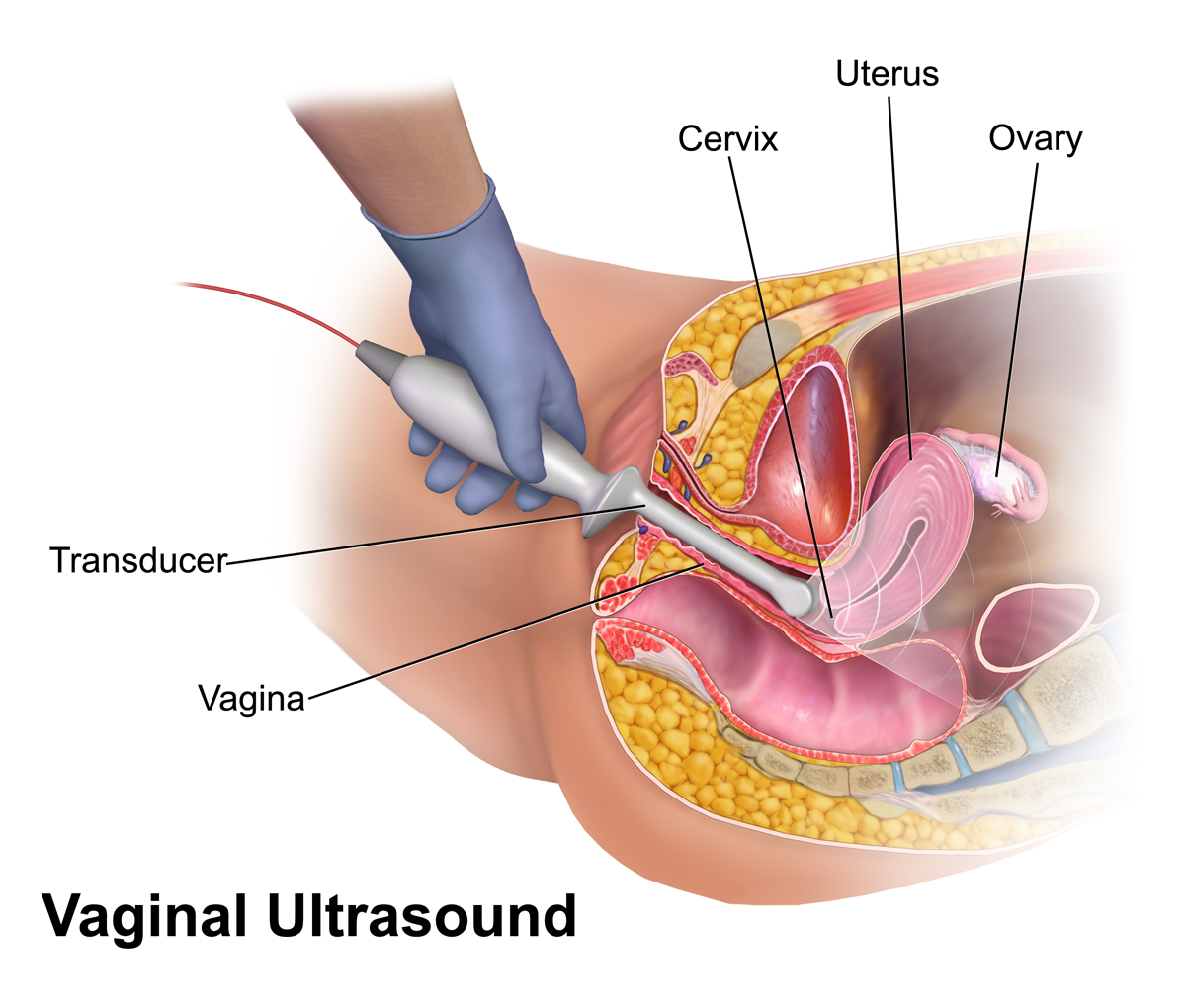
Transvaginal ultrasonography procedure

Vaginal ultrasonography is used both as a means of gynecologic ultrasonography and obstetric ultrasonography. It is preferred over abdominal ultrasonography in the diagnosis of ectopic pregnancy. It also can be used to evaluate patients with post-menopausal bleeding. The finding on transvaginal ultrasound of a thin endometrial lining gives the physician a 99% negative predictive value that the patient does not have endometrial cancer. If a patient had a prior endometrial sampling that was inconclusive, then a transvaginal ultrasound can be used to triage a woman with post-menopausal bleeding.

== See also ==
- Gynecologic ultrasonography
- Post-menopausal bleeding
