= Ovarian hyperstimulation syndrome =

- Specialty: Gynecology

Ovarian hyperstimulation syndrome (OHSS) is a medical condition that can occur in some women who take fertility medication to stimulate egg growth, and in other women in sporadic cases. Most cases are mild, but rarely the condition is severe and can lead to serious illness or even death.

== Signs and symptoms ==
Mild symptoms include abdominal bloating and feeling of fullness, nausea, diarrhea, and slight weight gain. Moderate symptoms include weight gain greater than 1 kg (2.2 lb) per day, increased abdominal girth, vomiting, diarrhea, darker urine, decreased urine output, excessive thirst, and skin and/or hair feeling dry (in addition to mild symptoms). Severe symptoms are fullness/bloating above the waist, shortness of breath, pleural effusion, urination significantly darker or diminished in quantity, calf and chest pain, marked abdominal bloating or distention, and lower abdominal pain.

=== Complications ===
OHSS may be complicated by ovarian torsion or rupture, venous thromboembolism, acute respiratory distress syndrome, electrolytes imbalance, thrombophlebitis and acute kidney injury. Symptoms generally resolve in 1 to 2 weeks but will be more severe and persist longer if pregnancy occurs. This is due to human chorionic gonadotropin (hCG) from the pregnancy acting on the corpus luteum in the ovaries in sustaining the pregnancy before the placenta has fully developed. Typically, even in severe OHSS with a developing pregnancy, the duration does not exceed the first trimester. Mortality is low, but several fatal cases have been reported.

== Cause ==
Sporadic OHSS is very rare and may have a genetic component. Clomifene citrate therapy can occasionally lead to OHSS, but the vast majority of cases develop after use of gonadotropin therapy (with administration of FSH), such as Pergonal, and administration of hCG to induce final oocyte maturation and/or trigger oocyte release, often in conjunction with in vitro fertilisation (IVF). The frequency varies and depends on a woman's risk factors, management, and methods of surveillance. About 5% of treated women may encounter moderate to severe OHSS. Risk factors include polyendocrine metabolic ovarian syndrome (PMOS), young age, low BMI, high antral follicle count, the development of many ovarian follicles under stimulation, extreme elevated serum estradiol concentrations, the use of hCG for final oocyte maturation and/or release, the continued use of hCG for luteal support, and the occurrence of a pregnancy (resulting in hCG production).

=== Medications ===
Ovarian hyperstimulation syndrome is particularly associated with injection of a hormone called human chorionic gonadotropin (hCG) which is used for inducing final oocyte maturation and/or triggering oocyte release. The risk is further increased by multiple doses of hCG after ovulation and if the procedure results in pregnancy.

Using a GnRH agonist instead of hCG for inducing final oocyte maturation and/or release results in an elimination of the risk of ovarian hyperstimulation syndrome, but a slight decrease of the delivery rate of approximately 6%.

== Pathophysiology ==
OHSS has been characterized by the presence of multiple luteinized cysts within the ovaries leading to ovarian enlargement and secondary complications, but that definition includes almost all women undergoing ovarian stimulation. The central feature of clinically significant OHSS is the development of vascular hyperpermeability and the resulting shift of fluids into the third space.

As hCG causes the ovary to undergo extensive luteinization, large amounts of estrogens, progesterone, and local cytokines are released. It is almost certain that vascular endothelial growth factor (VEGF) is a key substance that induces vascular hyperpermeability, making local capillaries "leaky", leading to a shift of fluids from the intravascular system to the abdominal and pleural cavity. Supraphysiologic production of VEGF from many follicles under the prolonged effect of hCG appears to be the specific key process underlying OHSS. Thus, while the woman accumulates fluid in the third space, primarily in the form of ascites, she actually becomes hypovolemic and is at risk for respiratory, circulatory (such as arterial thromboembolism since blood is now thicker), and renal problems. Women who are pregnant sustain the ovarian luteinization process through the production of hCG.

Avoiding OHSS typically requires interrupting the pathological sequence, such as avoiding the use of hCG. One alternative is to use a GnRH agonist instead of hCG. While this has been repeatedly shown to "virtually eliminate" OHSS risk, there is some controversy regarding the effect on pregnancy rates if a fresh non-donor embryo transfer is attempted, almost certainly due to a luteal phase defect. There is no dispute that the GnRH agonist trigger is effective for oocyte donors and for embryo banking (cryopreservation) cycles.

== Diagnosis ==
=== Classification ===
OHSS is divided into the categories mild, moderate, severe, and critical. In mild forms of OHSS the ovaries are enlarged (5–12 cm) and there may be additional accumulation of ascites with mild abdominal distension, abdominal pain, nausea, and diarrhea. In severe forms of OHSS there may be hemoconcentration, thrombosis, distension, oliguria (decreased urine production), pleural effusion, and respiratory distress. Early OHSS develops before pregnancy testing and late OHSS is seen in early pregnancy.

Criteria for severe OHSS include enlarged ovary, ascites, hematocrit > 45%, WBC > 15,000, oliguria, creatinine 1.0–1.5 mg/dl, creatinine clearance > 50 ml/min, liver dysfunction, and anasarca. Critical OHSS includes enlarged ovary, tense ascites with hydrothorax and pericardial effusion, hematocrit > 55%, WBC > 25,000, oligoanuria, creatinine > 1.6 mg/dl, creatinine clearance < 50 ml/min, kidney failure, thromboembolic phenomena, and ARDS.

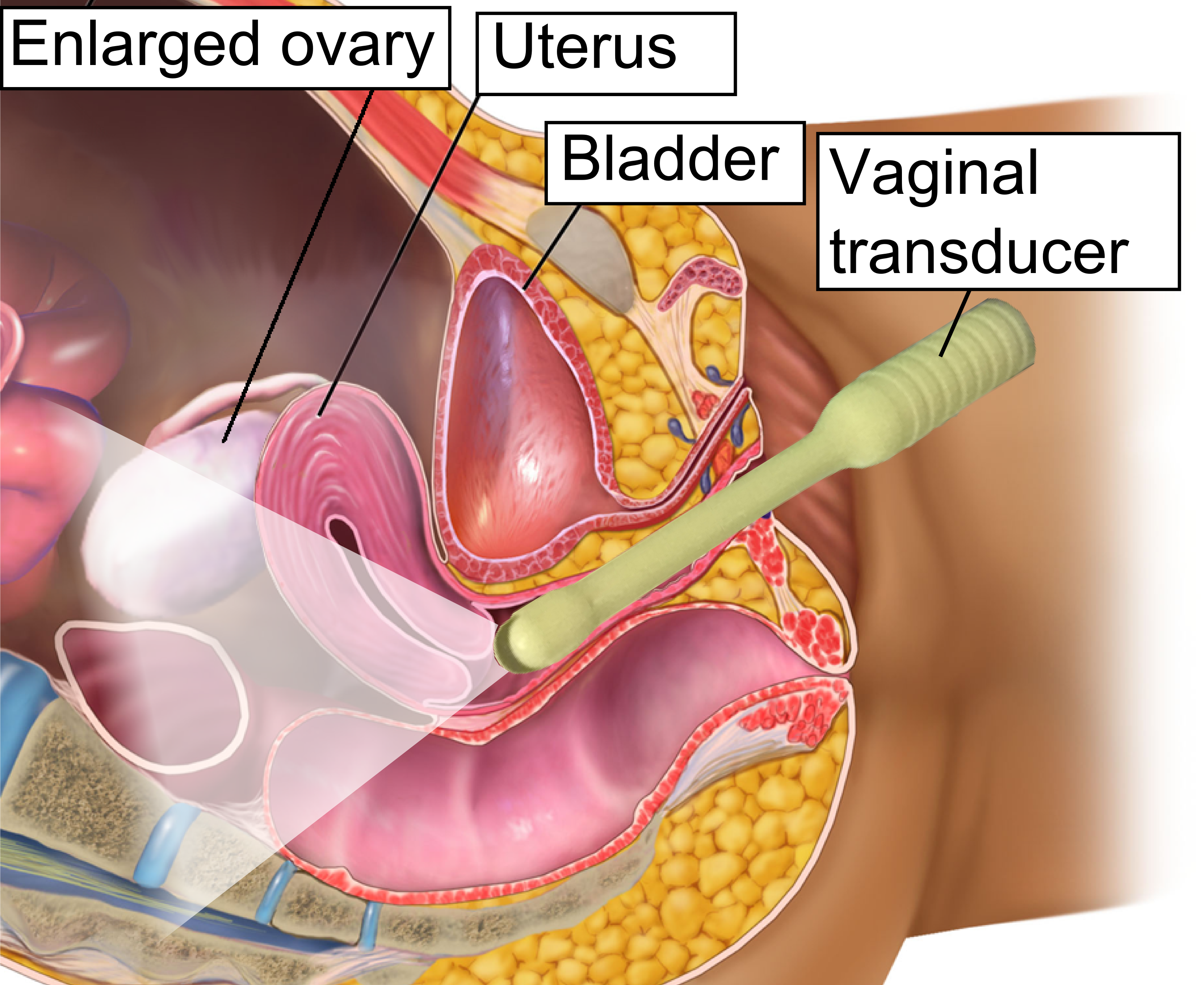

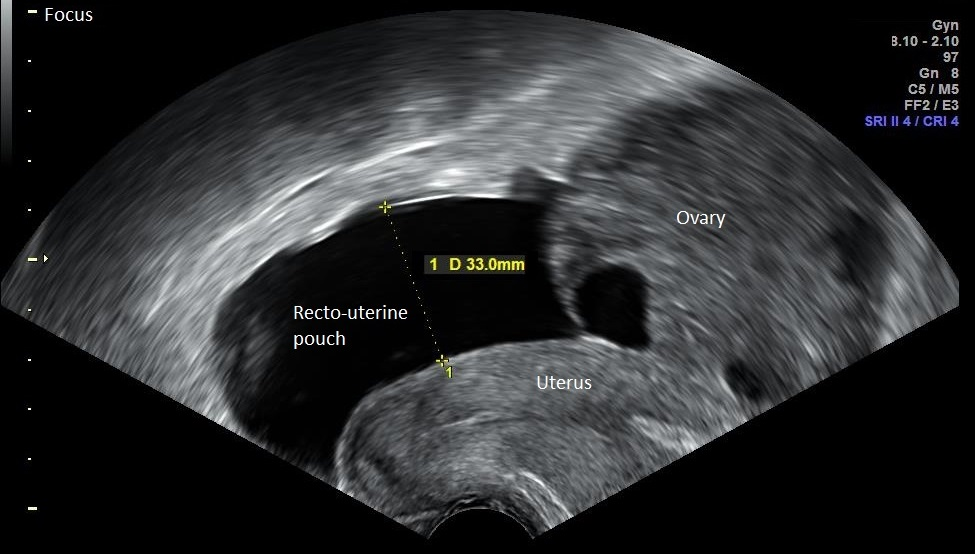

Vaginal ultrasonography in the sagittal plane in a woman with mild OHSS, showing a 33 mm wide anechogenic area behind the uterus in the recto-uterine pouch, which means there was ascites, that is, free fluid in the peritoneal cavity. Normally, there is up to 5 ml of fluid in the recto-uterine pouch, corresponding approximately to an area up to 10 mm wide. The ovary measured up to 6.5 cm in diameter.

== Prevention ==
Physicians can reduce the risk of OHSS by monitoring of FSH therapy to use this medication judiciously, and by withholding hCG medication.

Cabergoline confers a significant reduction in the risk of OHSS in high risk women according to a Cochrane review of randomized studies, but the included trials did not report the live birth rates or multiple pregnancy rates. Cabergoline, as well as other dopamine agonists, might reduce the severity of OHSS by interfering with the VEGF system. A systematic review and meta-analysis concluded that prophylactic treatment with cabergoline reduces the incidence, but not the severity of OHSS, without compromising pregnancy outcomes.

The risk of OHSS is smaller when using GnRH antagonist protocol instead of GnRH agonist protocol for suppression of ovulation during ovarian hyperstimulation. The underlying mechanism is that, with the GnRH antagonist protocol, initial follicular recruitment and selection is undertaken by endogenous endocrine factors prior to starting the exogenous hyperstimulation, resulting in a smaller number of growing follicles when compared with the standard long GnRH agonist protocol.

A Cochrane review found administration of hydroxyethyl starch decreases the incidence of severe OHSS. There was insufficient evidence to support routine cryopreservation and insufficient evidence for the relative merits of intravenous albumin versus cryopreservation. Also, coasting, which is ovarian hyperstimulation without induction of final maturation, does not significantly decrease the risk of OHSS.

Volume expanders such as albumin and hydroxyethyl starch solutions act providing volume to the circulatory system.

== Treatment ==
Treatment of OHSS depends on the severity of the hyperstimulation. Mild OHSS can be treated conservatively with monitoring of abdominal girth, weight, and discomfort on an outpatient basis until either conception or menstruation occurs. Conception can cause mild OHSS to worsen in severity.

Moderate OHSS is treated with bed rest, fluids, and close monitoring of labs such as electrolytes and blood counts. Ultrasound may be used to monitor the size of ovarian follicles. Depending on the situation, a physician may closely monitor a women's fluid intake and output on an outpatient basis, looking for increased discrepancy in fluid balance (over 1 liter discrepancy is cause for concern). Resolution of the syndrome is measured by decreasing size of the follicular cysts on 2 consecutive ultrasounds.

Aspiration of accumulated fluid (ascites) from the abdominal/pleural cavity may be necessary, as well as opioids for the pain. If the OHSS develops within an IVF protocol, it can be prudent to postpone transfer of the pre-embryos since establishment of pregnancy can lengthen the recovery time or contribute to a more severe course. Over time, if carefully monitored, the condition will naturally reverse to normal – so treatment is typically supportive, although a woman may need to be treated or hospitalized for pain, paracentesis, and/or intravenous hydration.
