= Roger A. Pedersen =

American-British stem cell biologist

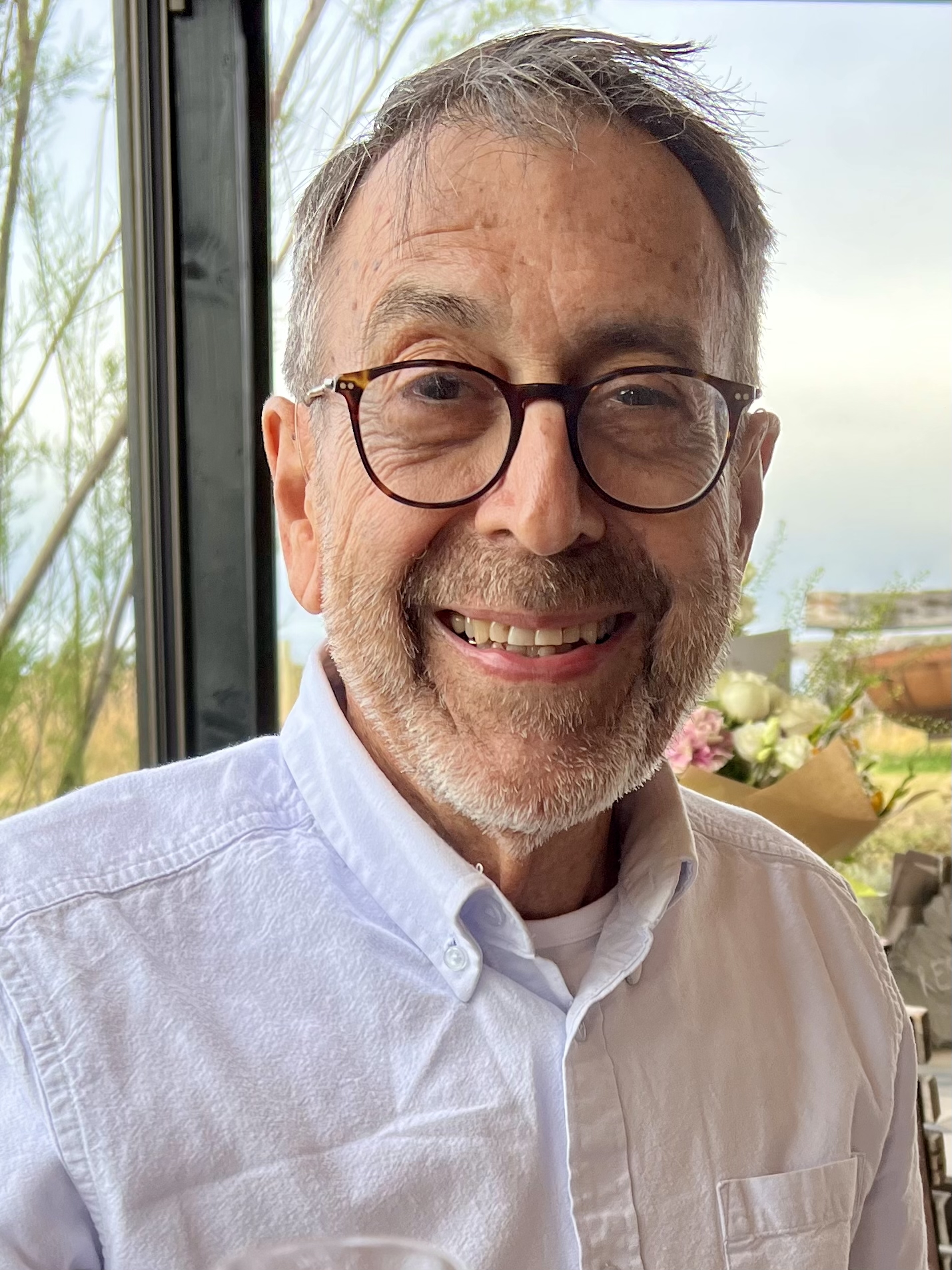
- Born: Roger Arnold Pedersen; 01 August 1944
- Died: 02 February 2025 (aged 80 years)
- Education: Stanford University, Yale University
- Known for: Stem cell biology, developmental biology, cell programming, regenerative medicine
- Scientific career
- Workplaces: University California San Francisco, University of Cambridge, Stanford University

Roger A. Pedersen (1944 - 2025) was a prominent American-British stem cell biologist known for his pioneering research in the fields of developmental biology, regenerative medicine, and pluripotent stem cells. His work has significantly contributed to the understanding of stem cell biology and has implications for therapeutic applications.

== Education ==
Pedersen completed his undergraduate studies at Stanford University, earning an A.B with distinction in Biology in 1965. He earned his Ph.D. in developmental genetics in 1970 at Yale University under the guidance of isozyme pioneer Clement Markert, collaborating with Yoshi Masui on the biochemical aspects of cell differentiation during embryonic development. Pedersen continued his academic journey with postdoctoral research at Johns Hopkins University with John Biggers, where he began using the mouse embryo as a model for studying mammalian embryonic development.

== Research career ==
Pedersen began his research career at UCSF in 1971, where he studied the developmental genetics of mouse embryos. These studies revealed the origins of tissues and the three-dimensional organization of mammals, highlighting the conservation of the gastrula fate map across vertebrates.

In 1992, Pedersen became Director of the UCSF assisted reproduction laboratory, where he introduced the use of micromanipulation for treating male infertility.

In the late 1990s, Pedersen together with Michael D. West organized the first collaborative effort to isolate human embryonic stem cells for the purpose of manufacturing products in regenerative medicine in collaboration with James Thomson at the University of Wisconsin at Madison, John Gearhart at Johns Hopkins School of Medicine.

In the early 2000s, Pedersen joined the University of Cambridge U.K., where he nucleated the Cambridge Stem Cell Initiative, later named the Cambridge Stem Cell Institute (2012). In 2008, Pedersen established and led the Institute's translational division, the Anne McLaren Laboratory for Regenerative Medicine. He gained recognition for his investigations into the molecular mechanisms governing stem cell pluripotency and differentiation. He discovered of a novel type of pluripotent stem cell from the late epiblast layer of mouse and rat embryos, which Pedersen named epiblast stem cells (EpiSCs) – the mouse counterpart to human embryonic stem cells. His research has led to breakthroughs in understanding how stem cells can be directed to become various cell types both by directed differentiation and forward programming, with enormous potential for the realization of regenerative therapies.

In 2018, Pedersen returned to his alma mater as Adjunct Professor and Senior Research Scientist at Stanford University School of Medicine, USA. He was also Chief Scientific Advisor to bit.bio, Cambridge, U.K.

Pedersen received numerous awards and honors in recognition of his contributions to developmental biology and stem cell research. He was a Fellow at Churchill College, Cambridge (2006–2018), elected Fellow of the Society of Biology in 2011, and named a Siebel Scholar by the Stanford University Institute for Stem Cell Biology and Regenerative Medicine (2012–2013). His editorial contributions include serving on the boards of Cell Stem Cell (2006–2020), Molecular Reproduction and Development (Associate Editor, 1991–2025), and the International Journal of Developmental Biology (1989–2025).
