= Elizabeth Simpson =

Elizabeth Simpson may refer to:

- Elizabeth Simpson (archaeologist)
- Elizabeth Simpson (biologist)
- Elizabeth Simpson (educator), developed a psychomotor objective hierarchy for Bloom's taxonomy
- Elizabeth Inchbald (née Simpson) (1753–1821), English writer and actress
- Elizabeth Simpson Burke (1906-2005), missionary in Haiti
- Elizabeth Simpson Drewry (1893–1979), American politician

== See also ==
- Lisa Simpson, a fictional character in the animated television series The Simpsons
