= St Mary's Church, Charing Cross Road =

Former church in Westminster, London

Coordinates: 51.51281°N 0.12891°W

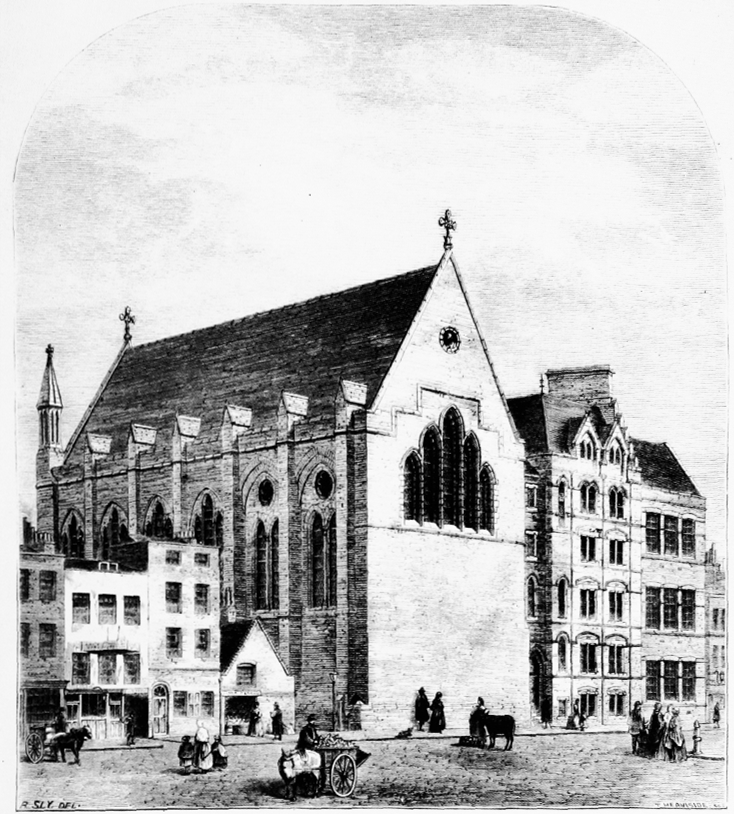
Drawing of the planned church, circa 1870

St Mary's Church, Charing Cross Road (in full, St Mary the Virgin), was an Anglican church in Charing Cross Road (originally Crown Street), Westminster, from 1851. The building was formerly the site of an ancient church, called 'The Greek Church', and St Mary's was never fully built, with only the chancel and the north aisle being completed. The structure was demolished in the 1930s.

== Description ==
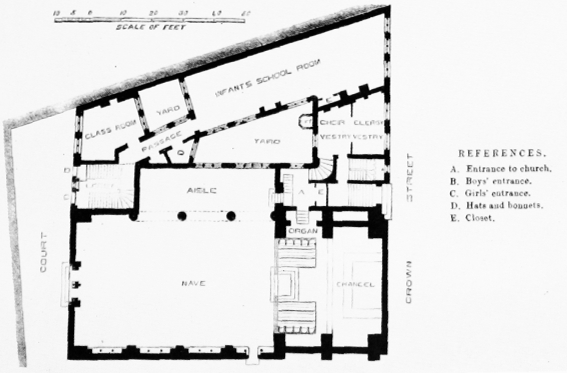
Planned layout of the church

The parish was originally part of the parish of St Anne's Church, Soho, and became a separate parish in its own right in 1854, within the Diocese of London.

In the 1860s J.C.Chambers was the incumbent and among his helpers was Sister Kate who was then a Novice with the Society of Saint Margaret. She helped with caring for the sick and dying and teaching at the church's day schools and night schools. The work was abandoned in 1865 but her experience was recorded in her two books Memories of a Sister of S Saviour's Priory and Old Soho Days and other Memories (in 1906).

In 1900, Leopold Stokowski formed and trained the choir there and played the organ.

In 1932, St Mary's was united with St Anne's, and by the end of 1934 the church had been demolished. The 17th-century stone bearing the Greek inscription which recorded the construction of the old nave was presented to the Greek Orthodox cathedral of Aghia Sophia, Moscow Road, Bayswater where it was re-erected. The cornerstone of 1900 was similarly set up in the church of St. Mary the Virgin, Kenton, Middlesex, which was built with the aid of funds from the sale of the site. The sale was concluded in March 1935, when the site was bought by the London County Council to form part of the site of a new building to house Saint Martin's School of Art.
