= Romel Joseph =

Haitian violinist

- Romel Joseph, from a 1982 newspaper photo
- Born: May 19, 1959; Gros Mornes, Haiti
- Died: October 6, 2015; Port-au-Prince, Haiti
- Occupation(s): Violinist, music educator

Romel Joseph (May 19, 1959 – October 6, 2015) was a Haitian professional violinist best known as the founder of The New Victorian School, a private school for grade-school children located in Turgeau, Port-au-Prince, Haiti.

== Early life and education ==
Joseph was born in Gros Mornes, Haiti, the middle of five kids. He was raised by Anglican nuns at the St. Vincent School for Handicapped Children in Port-au-Prince, Haiti, including the school's director, Sister Joan Margaret. Born with congenital cataracts, a condition that left him with less than 10% vision even after corrective surgery in 1980, Joseph earned a Fulbright scholarship despite his handicap and later graduated with a Bachelor of Arts degree from Cincinnati College-Conservatory of Music in 1982 and a Master of Arts in violin performance from Juilliard School of Music. He also studied with the Boston Symphony Orchestra at the Berkshire Music Center.

== Career ==
Joseph worked as the music director at the St. Vincent's School for Handicapped Children where he had attended as a child. He founded The New Victorian School in Port-au-Prince in 1991. In 1996, he founded and served as executive director of the Walenstein Musical Organization, a non-profit that provides music education, training, and performance opportunities to children in South Florida. He was also executive director of the Friends of Music Education for Haiti, a Florida nonprofit. Joseph rebuilt The New Victorian School after it was destroyed by a fire in 2000, and again ten years later after it was destroyed on January 12, 2010, during the 2010 Haitian earthquake.

Based on his experience surviving the earthquake, Joseph wrote The Miracle of Music: Experience How Romel Joseph Has Used His Musical Knowledge and Talent to Overcome Some of His Most Challenging Life Obstacles.

== The 2010 earthquake and its personal aftermath ==
When the 2010 quake struck, Joseph was on the third floor of The New Victorian School and became buried beneath the rubble for 18 hours. He claimed to have kept himself alive by mentally reciting every major piece of classical music he had performed until rescuers found him. He was flown to Miami, Florida, where he was treated for three months and underwent multiple surgeries for a crushed arm and two crushed legs at Jackson Memorial Hospital. Joseph's second wife, Myslie, and their unborn child did not survive the quake. He died at age 56 on October 6, 2015, after having a stroke. His daughter Victoria Joseph is also a violinist.
