= Nahil Bishara =

Palestinian painter

- Born: Nahil Nicola Aqel; 1919; Jerusalem
- Died: 1997 (aged 77–78)
- Spouse: Assad Bishara

Nahil Nicola Bishara (née Aqel; 1919–1997) was a Palestinian artist and designer. Her multidisciplinary work included Impressionist-style painting, sculpture, ceramics, interior decoration and crafts.

== Early life and career ==
Bishara was born to parents Nicola and Shafiqa Aqel and grew up in Ramallah with her four siblings. Their father passed away when she was young. Bishara commuted to Jerusalem to attend Schmidt's Girls College, completing her schooling in 1942.

Interested in painting, Bishara met William A Stewart, who offered to send Bishara to an arts school in England. Her parents declined to allow it during the Second World War. Instead, Bishara became first Palestinian woman artist accepted to the Bezalel Academy of Arts and Design. She later completed a diploma in sculpture at the Accademia di Belle Arti di Perugia in 1956 and a diploma in ceramics and building at the Chicago School of Interior Design and Decoration in 1962.

In the early 1960s, Bishara oversaw decorating the interior of the Jerusalem International YMCA's Aelia Capitolina hotel. She designed the chandelier and tables and donated 30 of her paintings to put on display. Kamal Boullata described it as the "first of its kind attempted by a native Arab for a public space in Jerusalem". In 1964, Bishara was commissioned to sculpt Pope Paul VI by the Hashemite Kingdom of Jordan. She was also commissioned by Pope Paul VI to create illustrations depicting Saint Bernadette's life.

Bishara was an advocate of Palestinian art and crafts, becoming involved in arts education and helping to revive glassblowing factories.

== Artistry ==
Bishara's Impressionist and expressionist-style paintings differed from the realism of those by her contemporaries. The paintings depict Jerusalem cityscapes, landscapes, Palestinian life and flora. Her crafts used locally sourced materials.

== Personal life ==
She married Dr Assad Bishara. The couple lived in East Jerusalem and had a son and a daughter. She spoke four languages, including French and Italian.

== Legacy ==
Bishara was one of the subjects of a 2007 book from the Palestinian Art Court—al-Hoash titled Palestinian Women Artists: the Land, the Body, the Narrative, edited by Reem Fadda.

One of Bishara's works was part of a 2019 Christie's auction on Palestinian modernism.

In 2023 and 2024, Bishara's work featured in the On This Land exhibition at Concrete on Alkersal Avenue in Dubai.
