= Elizabeth Burke =

Elizabeth Burke may refer to:

- Elizabeth Burke, a character in the television series White Collar
- Elizabeth Burke, a character in The Faculty
- Elizabeth Burke-Plunkett, née Elizabeth Burke (1862–1944), Irish activist
- Elizabeth Simpson Burke (1906–2005), American missionary
- Betty Burke, alias of Bonnie Prince Charlie
- Bette Nash, née Burke (1935–2024), American flight attendant
