= John Biggers =

John Biggers may refer to:

- John D. Biggers (1923–2018), British reproductive biologist
- John T. Biggers (1924–2001), American muralist
