= Peter C. Klatsky =

American fertility doctor

- Education: Bachelor of Arts, Doctor of Medicine
- Alma mater: Icahn School of Medicine at Mount Sinai, Columbia University
- Occupations: Infertility specialist and assistant professor of medicine
- Years active: 24
- Known for: Reproductive endocrinology and infertility
- Website: Peter Klatsky's page

Peter C. Klatsky is a Doctor of Medicine specialized in reproductive endocrinology and infertility and an assistant professor at the Albert Einstein College of Medicine. Klatsky who is board certified in his specialty as well as in obstetrics and gynaecology, is also the Founder and CEO of Spring Fertility Management Llc, a San Francisco Bay Area fertility company. Klatsky is a member of the Council on Foreign Relations, a nonprofit think tank specializing in U.S. foreign policy and international affairs.

== Education ==
In 1998, Klatsky earned a Bachelor of Arts in political science at Amherst College and graduated in 2003 with Alpha Omega Alpha honors from The Icahn School of Medicine at Mount Sinai. Then, he completed his residency training at the University of California, San Francisco (UCSF) and an infertility fellowship at Brown University. Later in 2008, Klatsky received a Master's degree in public health (MPH) at Columbia University Mailman School of Public Health.

== Career ==
Klatsky's scientific work includes single cell molecular genetic analysis and clinical research that has changed practices for patients with fibrosis using advanced reproductive technologies (such as IVF). He is member of the American Board of Obstetrics and Gynecology (certified in obstetrics and gynecology) and the American Board of Obstetrics and Gynecology (certified in reproductive endocrinology and infertility). Klatsky has been invited to make presentations and publications in medical journals and has also worked as a public health and human rights advocate in Southeast Asia, the Amazon, Africa, and New York.

- 2015 – Present: Founder, CEO, Spring Fertility Management Llc, San Francisco Bay Area.
- July 2011 – July 2015: Fertility specialist (reproductive endocrinologist), Montefiore Medical Center.
- July 2011 – July 2015: Assistant Professor, Albert Einstein College of Medicine Mentor at Blueprint Health, Blueprint Health LLC.
- January 2011 – March 2012: Physician, Fellowship, Reproductive Endocrinology & Infertility Women & Infants Hospital of Rhode Island.
- July 2008 – June 2011: Providence, Rhode Island Area. Physician and research fellow in infertility, research in advanced molecular genetic tests.
- June 2003 – June 2007: Physician, residency OBGYN, University of California, San Francisco.
- 1998 – 1999: Program intern at EarthRights International.

== Publications ==
During his career, Klatsky has published several articles in notable scientific medical journals and the Huffington Post.

- Klatsky, P.C. (2007). "Diagnostic imaging modalities in reproductive endocrinology". In Lewis, V. (ed.). Reproductive Medicine Handbook. Landes Bioscience.
- Klatsky, P.C.; Lane, DE (2007). "The effect of fibroids without cavity involvement on ART outcomes independent of ovarian age". Human Reproduction. 22 (521–6): 521–526. doi:10.1093/humrep/del370. PMID 16997932.
- Klatsky, P.C., Cronbach EJ; Cronbach, E.J. (2008). "Abruptio placentae in the setting of an atypical presentation of acute appendicitis". Journal of Reproductive Medicine. 53 (2): 129–131.
- Klatsky, P.C.; Tran, ND (2008). "Fibroids and reproductive outcomes: from conception to delivery". American Journal of Obstetrics and Gynecology. 198 (4): 357–66. doi:10.1016/j.ajog.2007.12.039. PMID 18395031.
- Klatsky, P.C.; Strachowski, L. "A uterine synechia during conception, implantation, and pregnancy". Fertility and Sterility. 91 (2707–8).
- Klatsky, P.C.; Wessel, G.M. (2010). "Detection of Oocyte mRNA in Starfish Polar Bodies". Molecular Reproduction and Development. 77 (286): 386. doi:10.1002/mrd.21172. PMC 3190191. PMID 20333754.
- Klatsky, P.C.; Wessel, G.M. (2010). "mRNA is Present in Human Polar Bodies". Molecular Reproduction and Development. 16 (938–43).
- Klatsky, P.C.; Delaney, S.S. (2010). "Obstetric and perinatal outcomes in age matched cohorts of ovum donor recipients and in vitro fertilization patients". American Journal of Obstetrics and Gynecology. 116 (1387–92).
- Reich, A.; Klatsky, P.C. (2011). "The transcriptome of a human polar body accurately reflects its sibling oocyte". Journal of Biological Chemistry. 286 (40743–9): 40743–40749. doi:10.1074/jbc.M111.289868. PMC 3220517. PMID 21953461.
