= William Lloyd Garrison House =

Historic house in Massachusetts, United States

- U.S. National Register of Historic Places
- U.S. National Historic Landmark
- U.S. Historic district – Contributing property
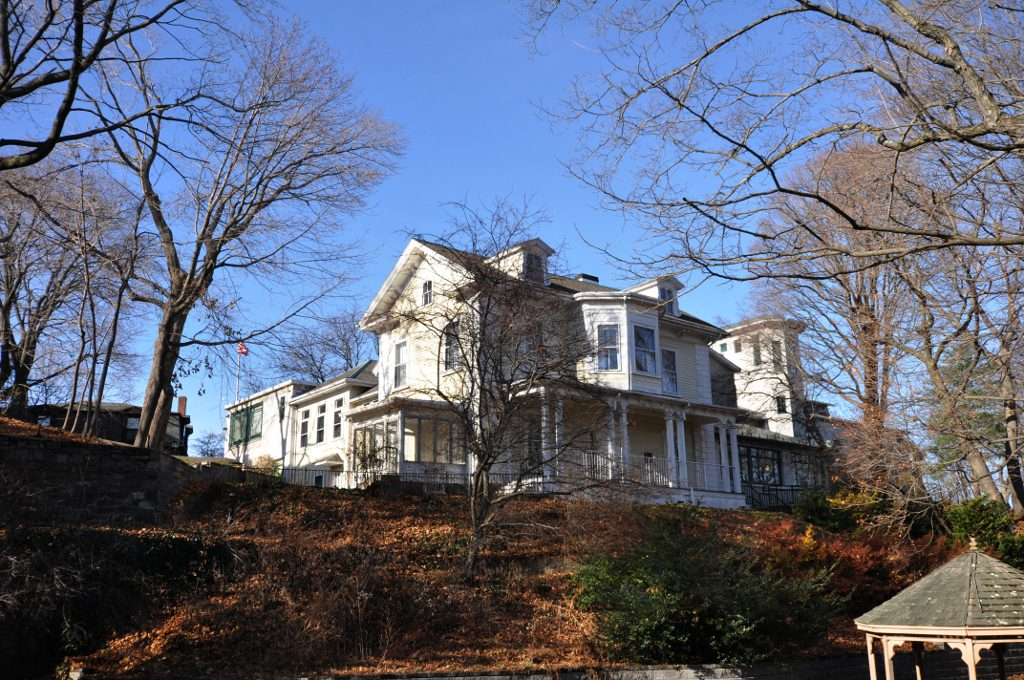

- Location within Boston Location within Massachusetts Location within the United States
- Location: Boston, Massachusetts
- Coordinates: 42°19′34″N 71°5′38″W
- Area: 0.74 acres (0.30 ha)
- Built: ca. 1840s
- Part of: Roxbury Highlands Historic District (ID89000147)
- NRHP reference No.: 66000653

Significant dates
- Added to NRHP: October 15, 1966
- Designated NHL: June 23, 1965
- Designated CP: February 22, 1989

The William Lloyd Garrison House, also known as Rockledge, is a National Historic Landmark house, located at 125 Highland Street in the Roxbury Highlands section of Boston, Massachusetts. Probably built in the 1840s or 1850s, it is significant as the longtime home of William Lloyd Garrison (1805–1879), one of the most high-profile abolitionist activists of the mid-19th century United States. Garrison published The Liberator, the principal organ of the abolitionist movement, and spoke for the immediate emancipation of slaves. Despite significant later alterations to accommodate institutional uses, the building has retained much of its 19th-century fabric. It was designated a National Historic Landmark in 1965 and a protected Boston Landmark in 2024.

== History ==
It is not known exactly when, by whom, or for whom, the house was originally built. It was purchased by William Lloyd Garrison in 1864, and was his home until his death in 1879. It was then acquired by a non-profit organized by African-American supporters called the Rockledge Associates, who sought to preserve the property as a memorial to Garrison. In 1904 it was purchased by the Episcopal Sisters of the Society of Saint Margaret, who altered the building to operate a home for needy elderly. In 2012 the Sisters' property, including the Garrison House, was purchased by Emmanuel College, which operates its Notre Dame campus there.

William Lloyd Garrison (1805–1879) was born in Newburyport, Massachusetts, trained as a printer, and was from an early date involved in the anti-slavery cause. In 1830 he began publishing The Liberator, which, despite a relatively modest circulation, became the leading publication of the abolitionist cause. On its pages Garrison regularly called for the immediate emancipation of all slaves. His advocacy was uncompromising, and upset not only slave-holding interests, but also members of the moderately anti-slavery business community. His advocacy sometimes resulted in physical violence against him and like-minded supporters; in one notable incident in Boston in 1835, Garrison was attacked by a mob and only narrowly escaped serious injury. In 1842 he began advocating a split of the Union if slavery was not abolished. His untiring advocacy provided a moral basis for the actions of Northerners in the American Civil War (1861–65). Garrison ceased publication of The Liberator in 1865, and semi-retired to Rockledge. He remained active in other progressive causes until his death.

== Description ==
The core portions of the Garrison house are its two-story main block and a two-story wing extending to the rear of the house. The main block stands on a rock ledge overlooking a grassy park at the base of the ledge. It has Italianate styling, some of which has been obscured by later alterations, with some details that were removed and later restored. The main facade is three bays wide, with single-story porch extending across its width. The porch is currently supported by grouped square columns with simple capitals; these are replacements for 19th-century columns that were more ornate. The main entrance is flanked by sidelight windows, and is framed by a molded surround rising to form a trefoil pattern. The corners of the house are quoined, a feature removed and later restored. Above the main entrance is a projecting oriel window, which is a 20th-century addition. Also a 20th-century addition is the glassed-in porch on the left side of the house. The rear wing has also had a bay window added, and a 19th-century single-story ell was replaced with a two-story mansard-roofed square structure at some time. The only interior spaces that have not been significantly altered are the entry hall and the main parlor (to the right of the entrance).

== See also ==
- National Register of Historic Places listings in southern Boston, Massachusetts
