= Bryan Clarke =

British professor of genetics (1932-2014)

Bryan Clarke FRS
- Born: Bryan Campbell Clarke; 24 June 1932; Gatley, Cheshire (now Greater Manchester)
- Died: 27 February 2014 (aged 81)
- Education: University of Oxford (BA, DPhil)
- Spouse: Ann Clarke (née Jewkes)
- Children: One daughter, Alex; one son, Peter
- Awards: Linnean Medal (2003); Darwin-Wallace Medal (2008); Darwin Medal (2010)
- Scientific career
- Fields: Genetics, evolutionary biology
- Workplaces: University of Nottingham; University of Edinburgh
- Thesis: Some factors affecting shell colour polymorphism in Cepaea (1961)
- Doctoral advisor: Arthur Cain
- Doctoral students: John Endler; Steve Jones
- Other notable students: Fred W. Allendorf

Bryan Campbell Clarke FRS (24 June 1932 – 27 February 2014) was a British Professor of genetics, latterly emeritus at the University of Nottingham. Clarke is particularly noted for his work on apostatic selection (which is a term he coined in 1962) and other forms of frequency-dependent selection, and work on polymorphism in snails, much of it done during the 1960s. Later, he studied molecular evolution. He made the case for natural selection as an important factor in the maintenance of molecular variation, and in driving evolutionary changes in molecules through time. In doing so, he questioned the over-riding importance of random genetic drift advocated by King, Jukes, and Kimura. With Professor James J Murray Jnr (University of Virginia), he carried out an extensive series of studies on speciation in land snails of the genus Partula inhabiting the volcanic islands of the Eastern Pacific. These studies helped illuminate the genetic changes that take place during the origin of species.

== Education ==
Clarke was educated at Magdalen College, Oxford, receiving a Bachelor of Arts degree in 1956 followed by a Doctor of Philosophy degree in 1961 from the University of Oxford for research investigating factors affecting shell colour polymorphism in the land snails (Cepaea).

== Career and research ==
Clarke was appointed a Lecturer at the University of Edinburgh in 1959 and was promoted to Reader by the time he left in 1971. In 1971 he became Foundation Professor at the new Department of Genetics at the University of Nottingham becoming Emeritus Professor in 1997. During this period he spent two spells (1971–76, 1981–93) as Head of Department.

Clarke mentored many scientists in evolutionary genetics, supervising more than thirty research students, many of which went gone on to successful research careers themselves such as Steve Jones. He was a co-founder of the Population Genetics Group ("PopGroup") a scientific meeting for evolutionary and population genetics held annually in the UK since the 1960s.

Clarke was co-founder (with his wife Ann and Dame Anne McLaren) and trustee of the Frozen Ark project, launched in 2004 to preserve the DNA and living cells of endangered species worldwide.

Clarke acted as managing editor of the scientific journal Heredity from 1978 to 1985.

=== Awards and achievements ===
Clarke was elected a Fellow of the Royal Society in 1982. In 2003 he was both awarded the Linnean Medal for Zoology and elected a Foreign member of the American Philosophical Society. In 2004 he was elected a Foreign Honorary Member of the American Academy of Arts and Sciences. He received one of the thirteen Darwin-Wallace Medals awarded by the Linnean Society of London in 2008; at that time the award was made only every 50 years. He was awarded the Darwin Medal of the Royal Society in 2010 'for his original and influential contributions to our understanding of the genetic basis of evolution'.

In 1959 he published Berber Village, an account of an Oxford University expedition to the High Atlas mountains of Morocco.
