= Ann Clarke (immunologist) =

British immunologist and co-founder of the Frozen Ark project

Ann G. Clarke (née Jewkes) is a British immunologist and co-founder of the Frozen Ark project.

== Career ==
Clarke's research focused on the immunological relationship between mouse mothers and embryos. For six years she was an Inspector for the Human Fertilisation and Embryology Authority.

She and her husband, Bryan Clarke, made several scientific expeditions to French Polynesia, where they realised that the partula snail was facing rapid extinction after the introduction of a predator as a biological control for a different species. Inspired by this, they and Anne McLaren (1927–2007) founded the Frozen Ark project to preserve the DNA of species threatened with extinction. As of 2017 the project held some 48,000 frozen samples from 5,500 species.

In 2017 Clarke was the subject of an episode of BBC Radio 4's The Life Scientific.

== Selected publications ==
- MacKenzie-Dodds, Jacqueline; Clarke, Ann; et al. (June 2013). "Recent Initiatives in Biodiversity Biobanking: Summary of Presentations from the ESBB 2012 Conference". Biopreservation and Biobanking. 11 (3): 182–188. doi:10.1089/bio.2013.0018. PMID 24850096.
- Lerman, Dominik; Blomeke, Brunhilde; Browne, Robert; Clarke, Ann; et al. (March 2009). "Cryobanking of viable biomaterials: implementation of new strategies for conservation purposes". Molecular Ecology. 18 (6): 1030–1033. Bibcode:2009MolEc..18.1030L. doi:10.1111/j.1365-294X.2008.04062.x. PMID 19207252.
- Clarke, A. G. (January 2009). "The Frozen Ark Project: the role of zoos and aquariums in preserving the genetic material of threatened animals". International Zoo Yearbook. 43 (1): 222–230. doi:10.1111/j.1748-1090.2008.00074.x.
- Hetherington, C. M.; Humber, D. P.; Clarke, Ann G. (August 1976). "Genetic and immunological aspects of litter size in the mouse". European Journal of Immunogenetics. 3 (4): 245–252. doi:10.1111/j.1744-313X.1976.tb00581.x. PMID 789780.
- Clarke, Ann G.; Hetherington, C. M. (April 1972). "Immunogenetic aspects of maternal-fetal relations". Journal of Reproduction and Fertility. Supplement. 15: 99–118. PMID 4565753.
- Clarke, Ann G.; Hetherington, C. M. (March 1971). "Effects of Maternal Preimmunization on the Decidual Cell Reaction in Mice". Nature. 230 (5289): 114–115. doi:10.1038/230114a0. PMID 4927009.

== Personal life ==
Ann Jewkes married Professor Bryan Clarke (1932–2014) in 1960. They had a daughter and a son.
