= Anne McLaren =

British developmental biologist

The Honourable Dame Anne McLaren DBE FRS FRCOG
- Born: 26 April 1927; London, England
- Died: 7 July 2007 (aged 80); North Weald Bassett, England
- Education: Oxford University
- Spouse: Donald Michie (m. 1952; div. 1959)
- Awards: Royal Medal (1990); Japan Prize (2002)
- Scientific career
- Fields: Developmental biology, animal genetics
- Doctoral advisor: Kingsley Sanders
- Other academic advisors: J. B. S. Haldane; Peter Medawar

Dame Anne Laura Dorinthea McLaren, DBE, FRS, FRCOG (26 April 1927 – 7 July 2007) was a British scientist who was a leading figure in developmental biology. She paved the way for women in science and her work helped lead to human in vitro fertilisation (IVF). She left an enduring legacy marked by her research and ethical contributions to the field. She received many honours for her contributions to science, including election as fellow of the Royal Society.

== Early life ==
McLaren was born into a privileged family with notable lineage, as the fourth of five children. She was the daughter of Sir Henry McLaren, 2nd Baron Aberconway, a former Liberal MP, and Christabel Mary Melville MacNaghten. She was born in London and spent her early childhood there, attending private schools. At the age of seven she appeared in the film version of H. G. Wells' novel Things to Come, released in 1936. At the outbreak of World War II, she was 12 years old and her family moved to their estate at Bodnant, North Wales. During this time her education was interrupted, so she pursued solitary education through a correspondence course. She enjoyed writing mathematical puzzles, arithmetic, books, and educational pamphlets. At the age of 16 she returned to formal education and attended a private school at Longstowe Hall near Cambridge.

In 1945, she was awarded a scholarship for the next year at Lady Margaret Hall, Oxford. Her first two years were spent studying Honours Moderations in zoology, physics and mathematics, and her next two years were spent pursuing a course of study in zoology. She earned a Master of Arts (MA) in 1949. She continued her post-graduate studies at University College London from 1949: researching mite infestation of Drosophila under J.B.S. Haldane, she became the first women to win a Christopher Welch Scholarship. She obtained her Doctor of Philosophy in 1952 with Peter Medawar on the genetics of rabbits, and then on neurotropic murine viruses under Kingsley Sanders.

== Married life and early career ==
On 6 October 1952, she married fellow student Donald Michie. They worked together at University College London from 1952 to 1955, and afterwards at the Royal Veterinary College, on the variation in the number of lumbar vertebrae in mice as a function of maternal environment. McLaren would later take up research on fertility in mice, including superovulation and superpregnancy. In 1958, she published a landmark Nature paper with John D. Biggers reporting the first successful development and birth of mice embryos that were first recovered from naturally fertilized females at the 8–16 cells stage, then cultured in vitro for two days until the blastocyst stage, and finally transferred back to females' uterus until birth. This paper, "Successful Development and Birth of Mice cultivated in vitro as Early Embryos", has been called "one of the most significant papers in the history of reproductive biology and medicine". This was a highly productive time in her life and she contributed to 28 papers.

During this period, she had three children:

- Susan Michie (1955)
- Jonathan Michie (1957)
- Caroline Michie (1959)

The marriage ended in divorce in 1959, and McLaren moved to the Institute of Animal Genetics at the University of Edinburgh to continue her research. The couple remained on good terms; Michie also moved to Edinburgh. The experience of raising children as a single career parent made McLaren a strong advocate for government assistance towards childcare.

== Later career ==
McLaren spent the next 15 years (1959–1974) at the Institute of Animal Genetics, studying fertility, development and epigenetics, including the development of mouse embryonic transfer, immunocontraception, and the skeletal characteristics of chimerae. She published a highly renowned book on Chimaeras in 1976, receiving her first major award that same year. The Zoological Society of London's Scientific Medal, recognized her leading role in developing techniques for blastocyst transfer into recipient mice.

In 1974, she left Edinburgh to become the Director of the MRC Mammalian Development Unit in London. She held this position for 18 years. During this time she collaborated with Marilyn Monk, who played a significant role in Anne's research on germ cells. She also contributed to teaching and lecturing and took on leadership roles in scientific societies.

McLaren's work often took her outside the university. She was a member of the committee established to inquire into the technologies of in vitro fertilisation (IVF) and embryology, which later produced the Warnock Report. She was a member of the Nuffield Council on Bioethics, 1991–2000.

In 1992, she retired from the Unit and moved to Cambridge where she worked for the next 15 years. She joined the Wellcome/CRC Institute, later the Gurdon Institute. She was made a Fellow-Commoner of Christ's College, Cambridge in 1991. During this period she pursued her interests in sex determination, germ cells, and genomic imprinting, contributing to 48 papers. In addition, she used her position to promote women in academia and became an Honorary Fellow of Lucy Cavendish College in 1994. She was active in her support in the advancement of women in science and was a founder of the Association of Women in Science and Engineering (AWiSE). She was president of the AWiSE for several years.

In 2004, McLaren was one of the co-founders of the Frozen Ark project, along with husband and wife Bryan and Ann Clarke. The project's aim is "saving the DNA and viable cells of the world's endangered species".

== Research ==
While obtaining her doctorate in philosophy, she investigated the mechanisms of virus infection on the nervous system.

After her doctoral work, she shifted her research to embryology (now called developmental biology). With Donald Michie, she conducted joint research on the influence of maternal environment on lumbar vertebral counts in mice and gained expertise in the manipulation of mouse embryos. This research demonstrated the feasibility of cultivating mouse embryos in a lab setting and successfully achieving live births by implanting them into the uterus of a surrogate mother. In 1958, in collaboration with John D. Biggers, she published a seminal paper on the successful development and birth of mice cultivated in vitro. They showed successful birth after experimenting on embryos and blastocysts directly from one mother to another. These techniques became the basis for IVF.

During her collaborative research with Marilyn Monk and Elizabeth Simpson on sex determination and male fertility, she identified the earliest primordial germ cells through alkaline phosphatase staining and explored the role of testes cord formation and meiosis blockage in male genital ridges.

She contributed to regenerative medicine by exploring the pluripotency of mammalian embryos and its therapeutic implications.

== Honours and awards ==
In 1975, McLaren was made a Fellow of the Royal Society. From 1991 to 1996, she held the position of Foreign Secretary of the Royal Society and from 1992 to 1996 the position of vice-president; she was the first female officer in the society's 330-year history. In 1986, she was made a Fellow of the Royal College of Obstetricians and Gynaecologists for her pioneering work on fertility. In 1989 she presented the Ellison-Cliffe Lecture at the Royal Society of Medicine, and from 1990 to 1995 she was the Fullerian Professor of Physiology at the Royal Institution.

In 1993, she was created a DBE. From 1993 to 1994, she was president of the British Association for the Advancement of Science, and in 1998 she was made a Fellow of the Academy of Medical Sciences.

In 2001, she was awarded the Lifetime Achievement Award from the Society for Developmental Biology. In 2002, she was the only female recipient awarded the Japan Prize with Andrzej K. Tarkowski for their contributions to developmental biology. In 2007 she was awarded the March of Dimes Prize in Developmental Biology.

== Death ==
After reuniting in 2005, McLaren (aged 80) and Michie (aged 83) were killed on 7 July 2007, in a car accident on the M11 motorway as they travelled from Cambridge to London.

== Legacy ==
Anne McLaren's collaboration with Marilyn Monk and Elizabeth Simpson significantly advanced our modern understanding of sex determination and male fertility.

Her book "Mammalian Chimeras," published in 1976, solidified her as one of the world's leading experts in chimeras. She also published a book titled Germ Cells and Soma in 1967. Both of these are considered classics in the field.

In addition to her research, she played an important role in addressing the social, ethical, and political dimensions of cloning and stem cell research by actively engaging in bioethical discussions and contributing to the understanding of the implications of these technologies. Her involvement in discussions and her commitment to considering the broader social impact of these advancements marked her as a prominent voice surrounding these groundbreaking technologies.

She is remembered for her participation in setting up the Stem Cell Centre and the Centre for Trophoblast Research at Cambridge University. A biographical sketch published by the university's Department of Zoology describes her as one of the most distinguished practitioners of developmental biology.

The Anne McLaren Papers are housed at the British Library and can be accessed through the British Library catalogue.

There is a fund in the name of Anne McLaren for encouragement of scientific study. Cambridge University's Anne McLaren Laboratory for Regenerative Medicine was opened at the Cambridge Biomedical Campus in 2009.

On 26 April 2021, Google celebrated her 94th birthday with a Google Doodle.

There is an Anne McLaren Award for scientific excellence and associated lecture at Kellogg College Oxford. The college also has a guest accommodation building named in her honour.

== Obituaries ==
- Surani, Azim; Smith, Jim (16 August 2007). "Obituary: Dame Anne McLaren (1927–2007)". Nature. 448 (7155): 764–765. doi:10.1038/448764a. ISSN 0028-0836. PMID 17700691. S2CID 3231099.
- Rossant, Janet; Hogan, Brigid (3 August 2007). "Retrospective: Dame Anne McLaren (1927–2007)". Science. 317 (5838): 609. doi:10.1126/science.1147801. ISSN 0036-8075. PMID 17673646. S2CID 142581881.
- Vasetzky SG, Dyban AP, Zelenin AV (March 2008). "Dame Anne McLaren (1927–2007)". Russian Journal of Developmental Biology. 39 (2): 125–126. doi:10.1007/s11174-008-2010-4. ISSN 1062-3604. PMID 18669298. S2CID 195229748.

== See also ==
- Beatrice Mintz, a contemporary of Dame Anne McLaren

Academic offices
Preceded by Sir John Bertrand Gurdon	Fullerian Professor of Physiology; 1991–1999	Succeeded by Susan Greenfield
