= Michael W. Bruford =

British researcher (1963–2023)

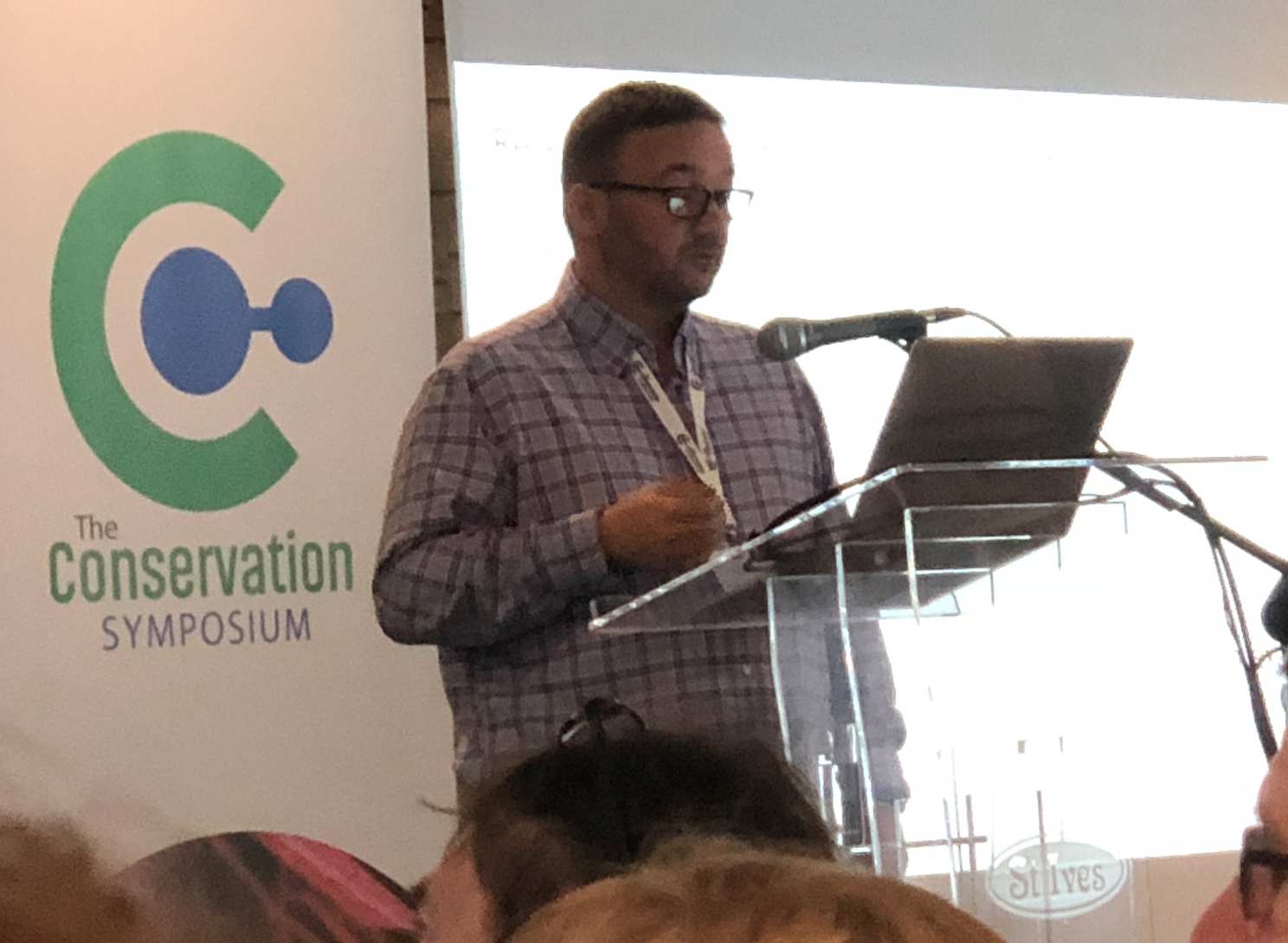
- Bruford in 2018
- Born: 6 June 1963
- Died: 13 April 2023 (aged 59)
- Education: University of Leicester
- Scientific career
- Fields: Molecular ecology
- Workplaces: Cardiff University
- Doctoral advisor: Terry Burke

Michael William Bruford (6 June 1963 – 13 April 2023) was a Welsh molecular ecologist, conservation biologist and a professor at Cardiff University's School of Biosciences. His area of research spanned from animal wildlife genetics to the management of captive populations and livestock breeds to animal biobanking. After earning his B.Sc. from the University of Portsmouth and his PhD from the University of Leicester, Bruford worked at the Zoological Society of London where he became Head of Conservation Genetics before joining Cardiff University as reader in 1999 and professor in 2001. In addition to his research activities at Cardiff University, he was also director of the Frozen Ark project, which seeks to preserve threatened animal species by means of cryopreservation.

== Education and career ==
Bruford was born in South Wales to Ann and Colin Bruford in 1963. After graduating from St Cyres Comprehensive School in 1981, he pursued and earned a B.Sc. (Hons) in biomolecular science from the University of Portsmouth in 1984. He then joined the University of Leicester for his PhD research under the supervision of Terry Burke on minisatellite markers in the genome of the domestic chicken. Bruford's PhD thesis, titled Hypervariable markers in the chicken genome, was submitted in 1992. In 1990, he joined the Zoological Society of London's conservation genetics group initially as a research associate, becoming its acting head in 1993 and finally its head in 1994. Bruford held the latter position until 1999, when he took on the position of a reader in the School of Biosciences at Cardiff University. Two years later, in 2001, he became a professor at Cardiff University.

Bruford became co-chair of the IUCN Species Survival Commission′s Conservation Genetics Specialist Group in 2014 (alongside Gernot Segelbacher). Initially a trustee, Bruford was director of the Frozen Ark project since 2015, the same year he became co-director (to Terry Marsden) of the Sustainable Places Institute in Cardiff. From 2019 to his death in 2023, he was also Dean for Environmental Sustainability at Cardiff University. Over his career, Bruford served as editor for several journals in conservation biology and genetics; from 2012 to 2016, he was editor-in-chief for Heredity. He was part of the IUCN Conservation Breeding Specialist Group since 1993.

== Research topics ==
Trained as a molecular biologist, Michael Bruford established links to behavioural ecology and conservation biology early on in his work. One of his first publications together with Terry Burke and Nick Davies seeks to link insights from bird genetics to their mating and breeding behaviour in dunnocks. Since the early 1990s, Bruford has made contributions to conservation biology by exploring population genetics of wild, captive and domestic animals. Recently, he has also sought to advance the field of biobanking of animal DNA, tissue and germlines for conservation purposes in the United Kingdom and beyond. Aside from his role as director of the Frozen Ark, a charity which seeks to support animal cryobanks and develop best practice procedures, Bruford was principal investigator in the BBSRC-funded project "CryoArks", which aims at establishing a national UK cryobank network.

Michael Bruford received a number of awards for his work. In 2003, he was awarded the Scientific Medal of the Zoological Society of London and in 2020 received the ZSL Marsh Award for Conservation Biology. The Learned Society of Wales elected him as a fellow in 2010. From 2012 to 2016, he held a Royal Society Wolfson Research Merit Award. In 2020, he was elected to the Academia Europaea and received the ZSL's Marsh Award for Conservation Biology. A year later, in 2021, Bruford was appointed an extraordinary professor at the University of Pretoria and received an A2-rating by South Africa's National Research Foundation.

== Death ==
Bruford died on 13 April 2023, at the age of 59.

== Publications ==
Bruford was co-author of more than 300 scientific publications in journals and edited volumes. Together with Giorgio Bertorelle, Heidi Hauffe, Annapaola Rizzoli and Cristiano Vernesi, he edited the handbook Population Genetics for Animal Conservation (2009).
