= Fred W. Allendorf =

American geneticist (born 1947)

- Born: Frederick William Allendorf; 29 April 1947 (age 79); Philadelphia, Pennsylvania, U.S.
- Education: Pennsylvania State University (BS); University of Washington (MS, PhD)
- Spouse: Diane Haddon (m. 2016)
- Children: 2
- Scientific career
- Fields: Population genetics; Conservation genetics; Conservation biology
- Workplaces: University of Montana; Victoria University of Wellington
- Thesis: Genetic Variability in a Species Possessing Extensive Gene Duplication: Genetic Interpretation of Duplicate Loci and Examination of Genetic Variation in Populations of Rainbow Trout (1975)
- Doctoral advisors: Fred Utter; Joseph Felsenstein
- Other academic advisors: Freddy Christiansen; Bryan Clarke
- Website: sites.google.com/view/fwallendorf/home

Frederick William Allendorf (born April 29, 1947) is an American biologist who is the Regents Professor of Biology Emeritus at the University of Montana. He has published widely on the topics of population genetics and conservation biology. Among other organisms, Allendorf has written extensively about salmon.

== Early life and education ==
Allendorf was born in Philadelphia. He earned a Bachelor of Science degree in zoology from Pennsylvania State University in 1971. He then went on to receive his Master of Science in fisheries in 1973 and his PhD in fisheries and genetics in 1975, both from the University of Washington.

== Career ==
Before he was a scientist, Allendorf served in the United States Army from 1965 to 1968 during the Vietnam War. After he received his PhD he was a postdoctoral scholar at Aarhus University in Denmark under Freddy B. Christiansen and was later a NATO Research Fellow at the University of Nottingham in England under Bryan Clarke. In 1987, Allendorf was elected as a fellow of the American Association for the Advancement of Science. In 1992, he was elected president of the American Genetic Association.

Allendorf was elected as a member of the American Academy of Arts and Sciences in 2019.

He received the 2015 Molecular Ecology Prize for his contributions to the fields of conservation genetics and molecular ecology.

== Personal life ==
In 2014, Allendorf's wife was killed in an avalanche that also destroyed his home.

== Selected publications ==
  - Allendorf, F.W., Funk, W.C., Aitken, S.N., Byrne, M., and Luikart, G.H. 2022. Conservation and the Genomics of Populations (3rd Ed). Oxford University Press: New York, NY. ISBN 978-0-19-885657-3
