= Katharine Egerton Warburton =

Mother Kate SSM
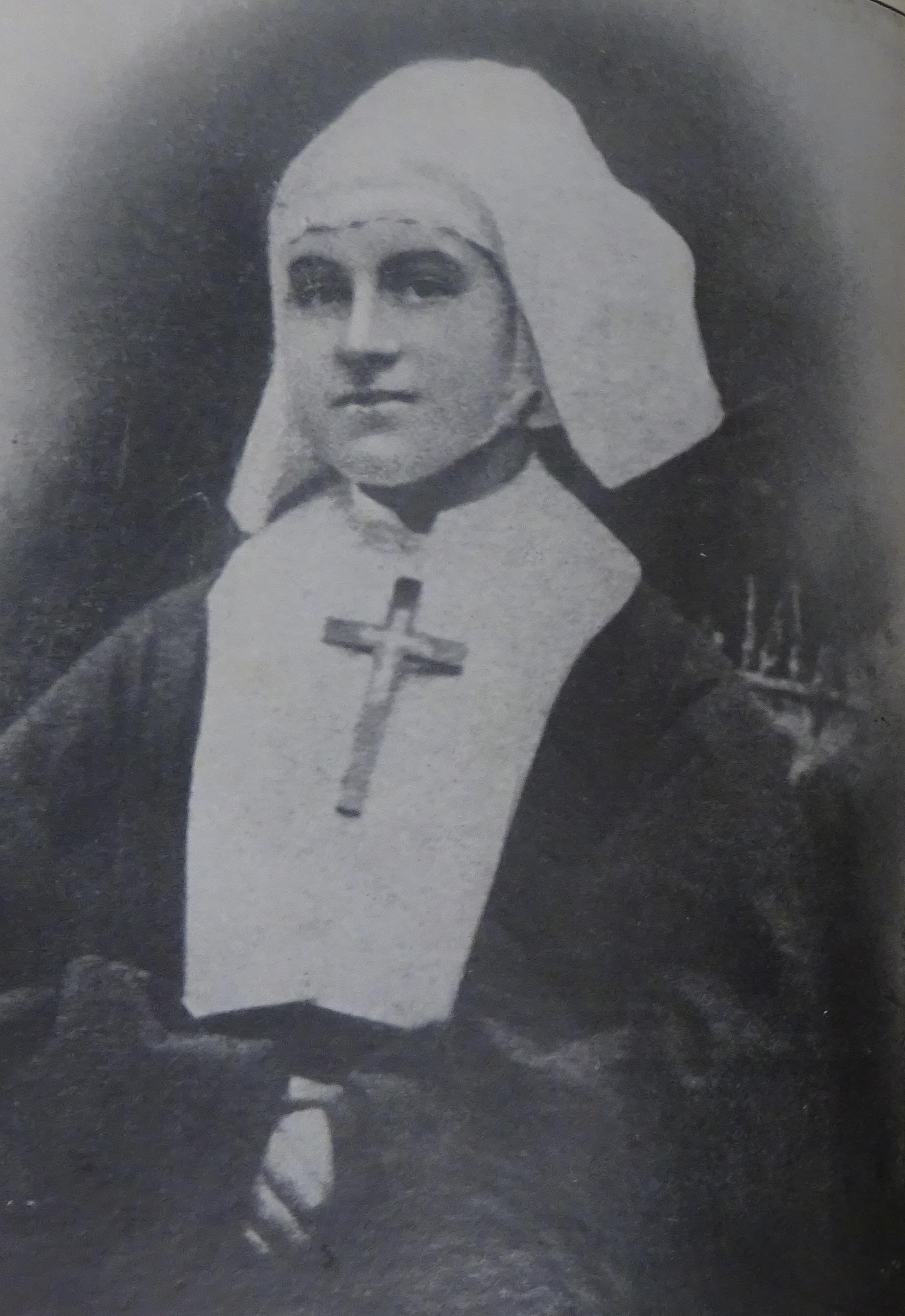

Personal life
- Born: Katharine Egerton Warburton; 24 March 1840 Warburton, Cheshire, England
- Died: 18 October 1923 (aged 83) Haggerston, London, England

Religious life
- Religion: Christianity
- Denomination: Church of England
- Order: Society of St Margaret
- Monastic name: Sister Kate
- Profession: c. 1861

Senior posting
- Post: Reverend Mother, Saint Saviours Priory, an affiliated house of the Society of St Margaret
- Period in office: 1868–1923

Katharine Anne Egerton Warburton (24 March 1840 – 18 October 1923), known as Mother Kate SSM, was a British Anglican nun and Mother Superior. She was elected Superior in Hackney after many of the Sisters left to become Roman Catholics.

== Life ==
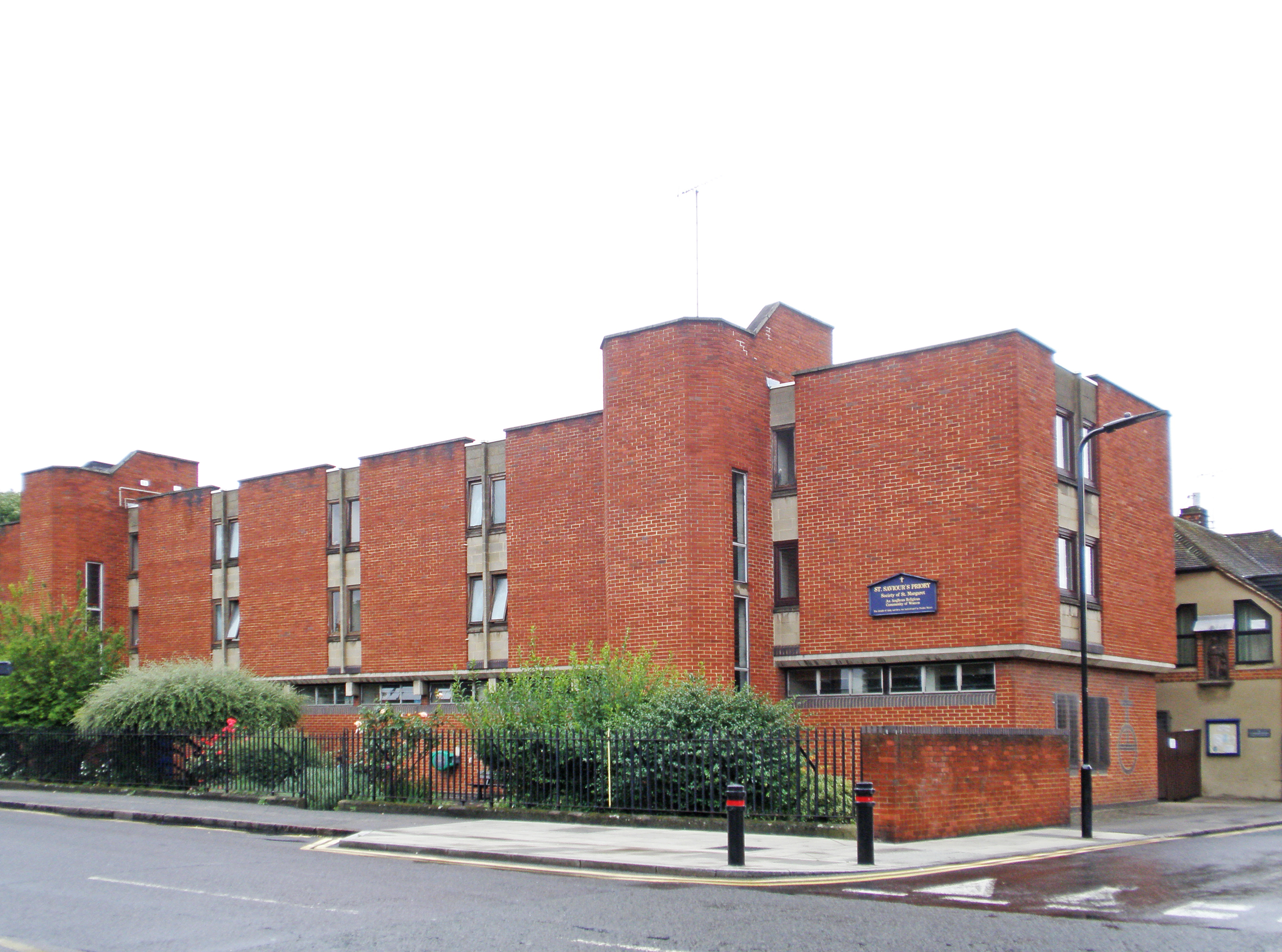
St Saviour's Priory, Haggerston

Warburton was born on 24 March 1840, in Warburton. She was the first child of Anne (born Stone) and James Francis Egerton-Warburton. Her Oxford-educated father was a Church of England priest. He became rector of Lymm cum Warburton in 1832. Her father died while she was still a child in 1849. She took religious guidance from her cousin, the poet, Rowland Egerton-Warburton. Rowland was a religious man with his own private chapel at Arley Hall. A choir would sing Matins every day, his staff would attend, and he would appear even if it was in his hunting attire.

When she was eighteen she wanted to join Elizabeth Neale at the Community of the Holy Cross, but her cousin's chaplain Charles Gutch recommended that she join the Society of Saint Margaret which had been founded in 1855 by Elizabeth Neale's brother, John Mason Neale. At the time these societies were controversial in the Anglican church.

At age 21, she professed her vows. Her first work was at St Mary's Church, Charing Cross Road. She helped with caring for the sick and dying in the parish and teaching at the church's day schools and night schools. The work there was abandoned in 1865 but her experience was recorded in her two books Memories of a Sister of S Saviour's Priory and Old Soho Days and other Memories (in 1906).

In 1866, she joined a group who were forming an affiliated house at Haggerston in the East End of London. Within two years many of the nuns had decided to leave the Church of England and to become Roman Catholics. In 1868, at age 28, she was elected Reverend Mother and along with the remaining nuns and novices were determined to carry on the work. The nuns who had left had taken all the funds and the building. Temporary homes were found but she would sleep on a table and their food would be cabbage.

They lived on Great Cambridge Street and ministered to the people of Haggerston with what was reported as its "crushed down desolate poverty". The group proved themselves when there was an outbreak of smallpox. They wrote to The Times and their appeal enabled them to give out food, clothes and bedding as they nursed those afflicted. She and the nuns went on to establish the instruments of social work. By 1888 they had created a dispensary, a nursery and the priory had a new building. Children were sent to their holiday homes in addition to the welfare they received during the rest of the year.

== Death and legacy ==
Mother Kate died on 18 October 1923, aged 83, at the Priory in Haggerston, London. In 1925, the Priory published Memories of Mother Kate by an unknown author.

Saint Saviours Priory Haggerston remains one of the affiliated houses of the Society of St Margaret continuing their life of prayer and work.
