= Frozen Ark =

Frozen zoo project

The Frozen Ark is a charitable frozen zoo project created jointly by the Zoological Society of London, the Natural History Museum and University of Nottingham. The project aims to preserve the DNA and living cells of endangered species to retain the genetic knowledge for the future. The Frozen Ark collects and stores samples taken from animals in zoos and those threatened with extinction in the wild. Its current director is Michael W. Bruford (Cardiff University). The Frozen Ark was a finalist for the Saatchi & Saatchi Award for World Changing Ideas in 2006.

The project was founded by Ann Clarke, her husband Bryan Clarke and Dame Anne McLaren. Since Bryan Clarke's death in 2014, the Frozen Ark's interim director has been Mike Bruford.
