= Society of Saint Margaret =

Anglican religious order

The Society of Saint Margaret (SSM) is an order of women in the Anglican Church. The religious order is active in England, Haiti, Sri Lanka, and the United States and formerly Scotland.

== History ==
The Sisters of St Margaret were founded in 1855 by the Reverend John Mason Neale at Rotherfield, England. The society had a difficult start. Many Anglicans in the mid-19th century were suspicious of anything suggestive of Roman Catholicism. In 1857, the founder, J. M. Neale, and some of the Sisters were manhandled in Lewes at the funeral of Sister Amy Scobell (Amy was the name she assumed on her entry to the Convent; she was baptised Emily Ann Elizabeth). However, Neale eventually won the confidence of many who had fiercely opposed the order.

As their numbers increased, they moved first to Church Lane, next to Sackville College (where Neale was Warden), with a chapel designed by George Frederick Bodley. By 1865, the foundation stone of their purpose-built convent, designed by George Edmund Street, known as Saint Margaret's, East Grinstead, Sussex, was laid with the convent opening on 20 July 1870. The range of buildings was completed in phases, with the chapel's foundation stone laid in 1879, being opened, along with the infirmary, on 26 July 1883. With the closure of the school in 1976, much of the large range of convent buildings (listed as Grade II* in 1972, revised to Grade I listing in 1981) became redundant. The Society of St Margaret, East Grinstead, had by then established a new convent (foundation stone laid on 10 January 1974) and, by the end of 1976, the old convent buildings had been purchased by Moor House Estates and subsequently converted into residential units. A history of the convent at East Grinstead was published in 2021.

The Society began its overseas activities in 1873 in Boston, Massachusetts (see SSM, Duxbury below), with a House opening in Colombo, Ceylon in 1887 (see SSM Colombo below) and Johannesburg, South Africa in 1898. In the UK, the Society opened a home for "delicate children" in Ventnor, Isle of Wight in 1879, a nursing home at 29 North Side, Clapham Common (known as the Hostel of God) in 1896 (the building now part of Royal Trinity Hospice, Clapham), and a daughter convent at Chiswick in 1910 (see SSM Chiswick below). Independent convents of the society were established in Aberdeen (1863) and Haggerston (1866), with the Priory of Our Lady, Walsingham opening in 1955.

=== St Margaret's, East Grinstead ===
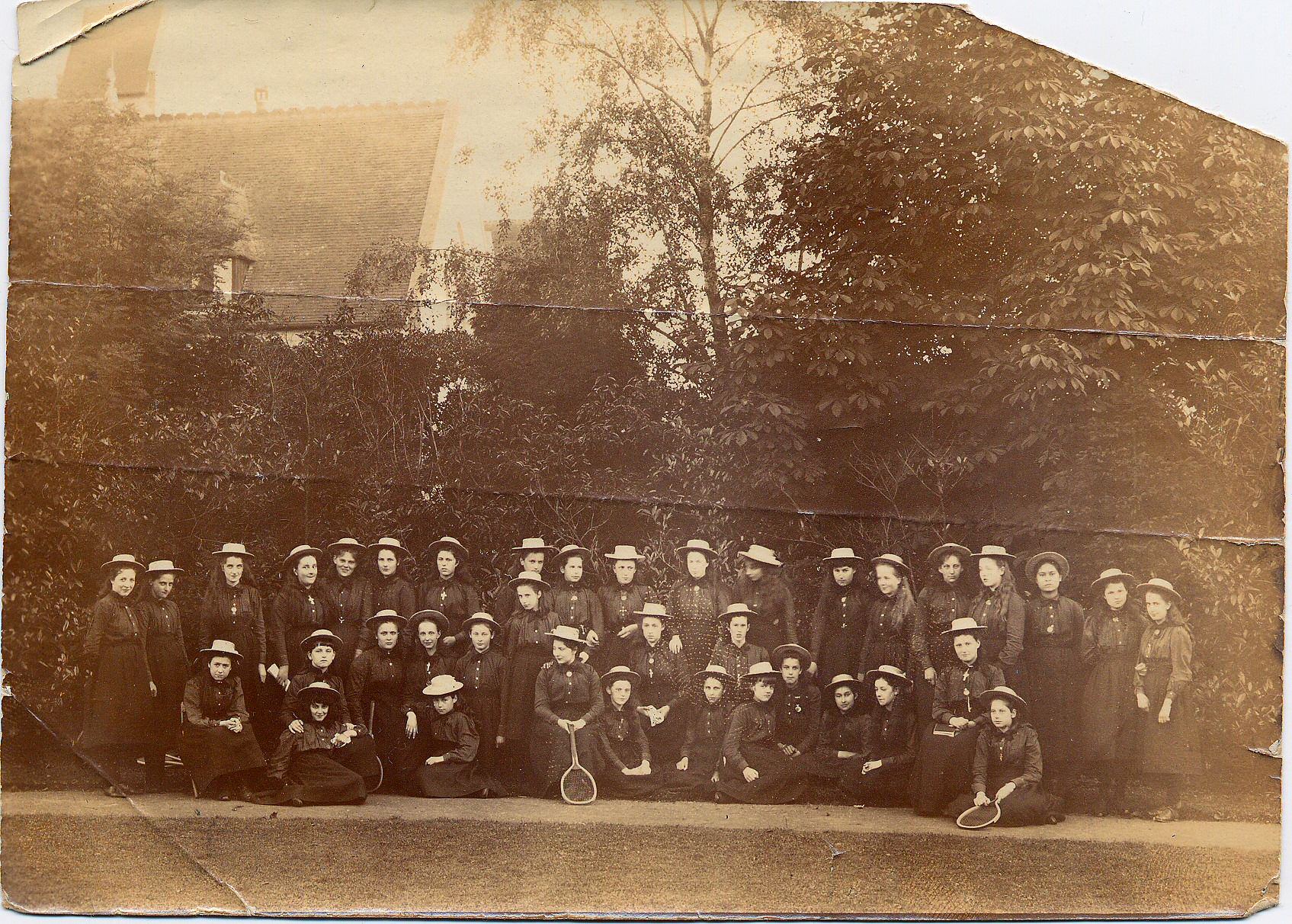
St Margaret's Convent Ladies School, East Grinstead ca 1890

St Margaret's, East Grinstead, had a total of 201 inhabitants in 1881: 57 staff, six "Industrial Girl scholars", 69 "Orphanage scholars", and 60 "St Agnes School scholars". The 66 staff were made up of: 42 "Sisters of Mercy", four "Teachers in St Agnes School", 10 servants, and a chaplain, Laughton Alison; the remaining inhabitants were the gardener's family and a few visitors. The Convent thus already included both Sisters and teachers, and the people cared for included orphans, poor "industrial" girls and schoolgirls from wealthier families.

In 1891, St Margaret's, East Grinstead had 205 inhabitants. The pupils were now divided into: 20 girls in "Training for domestic service"; 57 "Pupils in Ladies School"; 61 "Scholars in Orphanage School" aged between 3 and 16. There were also seven orphans aged 15 or 16 "Training for service". There were 42 "Sisters of Charity", four teachers and a needlewoman "in Ladies' School", two "Caretakers in Orphanage", and two "Teachers in Day School" - the Ladies' School was for boarders.

Photographs show "St Margaret's Convent" at Moat Road until 1936, and the Orphanage at Moat Road until 1910 (when the photograph shows the orphans in white sleeveless smocks with hoods, worn over darker dresses).

== Autonomous houses ==
The rapid growth of the order led to the development of a series of autonomous convents and priories within the SSM, originally under the direction of the Founder. While all such autonomous houses practise the same SSM Rule of life, and recognise each other as a single order, each house elects its own Mother Superior, and is independent in its work and decision-making. Since the death of Neale, there has been no single figure with authority across the order. Several of these autonomous convents have dependent priories, which are smaller units of the order, not having autonomous status, but whose sisters are under the authority of the Mother Superior of the 'parent' autonomous convent.

=== SSM (Duxbury, USA) ===
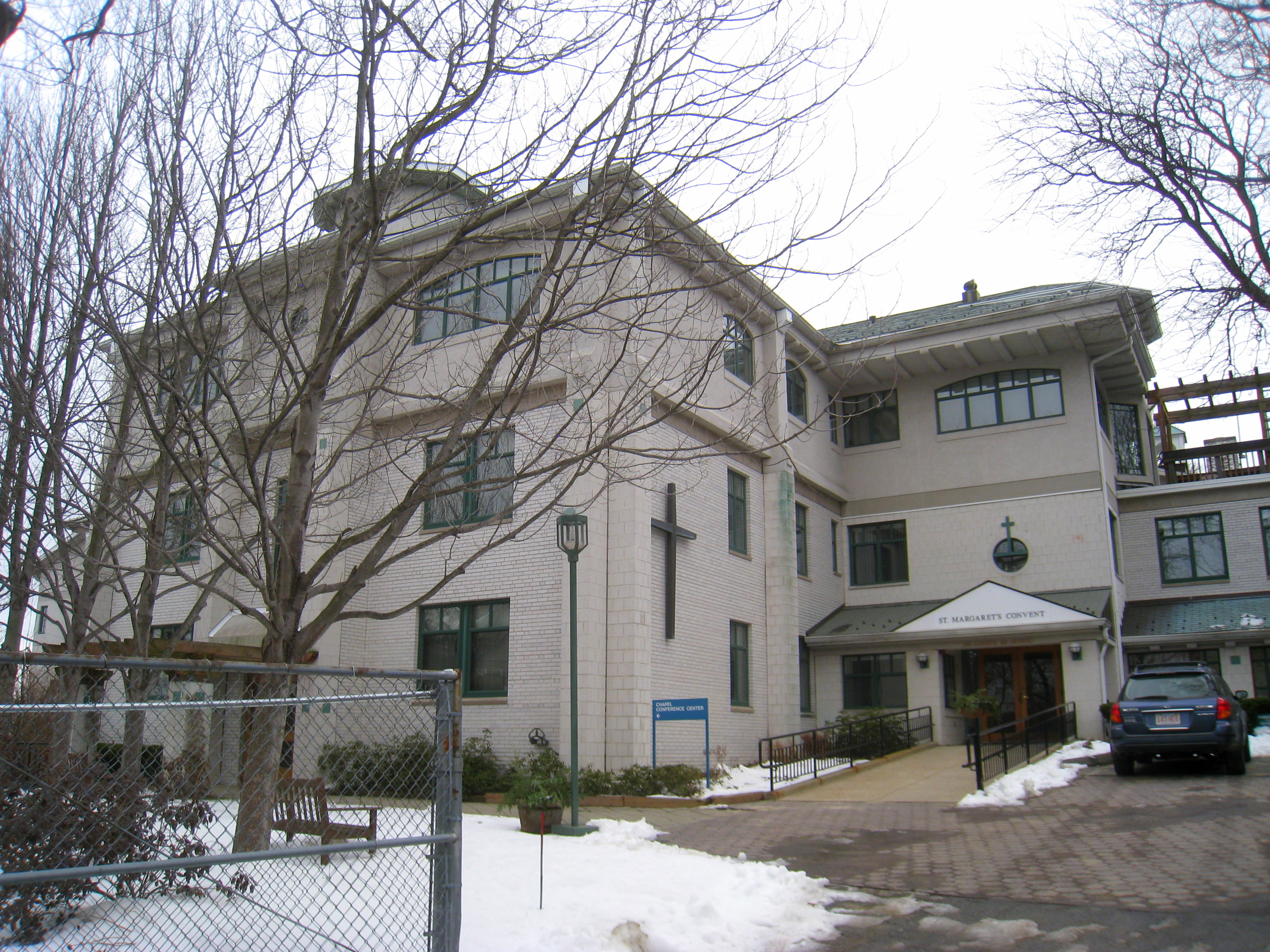
St Margaret's Convent in Boston (in 2010)

St Margaret's Convent, Duxbury, is an autonomous house of the order, with its convent located at Duxbury, Massachusetts. This house has outreach ministries to schools, prisons, homeless shelters, and a number of local parish churches. The sisters were historically based in their convent in Boston, Massachusetts, whilst Duxbury was a dependent priory. However, following re-organisation, St Margaret's Convent on Highland Park Street, Roxbury, Boston, was vacated and made available for sale. In 2012 the property, including William Lloyd Garrison House, was purchased by Emmanuel College, which operates its Notre Dame campus there.

Duxbury is now the chief convent of the community, although a small branch house is retained in Boston, as well as houses in New York and Haiti. Sisters are part of the pastoral care team at Trinity Church in Manhattan. Sister Joan Margaret, known for her work with disabled children in Haiti, was a member of this community.

There are dependent priories at:

- Boston, Massachusetts
- Port-au-Prince, Haiti
- New York

=== SSM (Hackney, England) ===
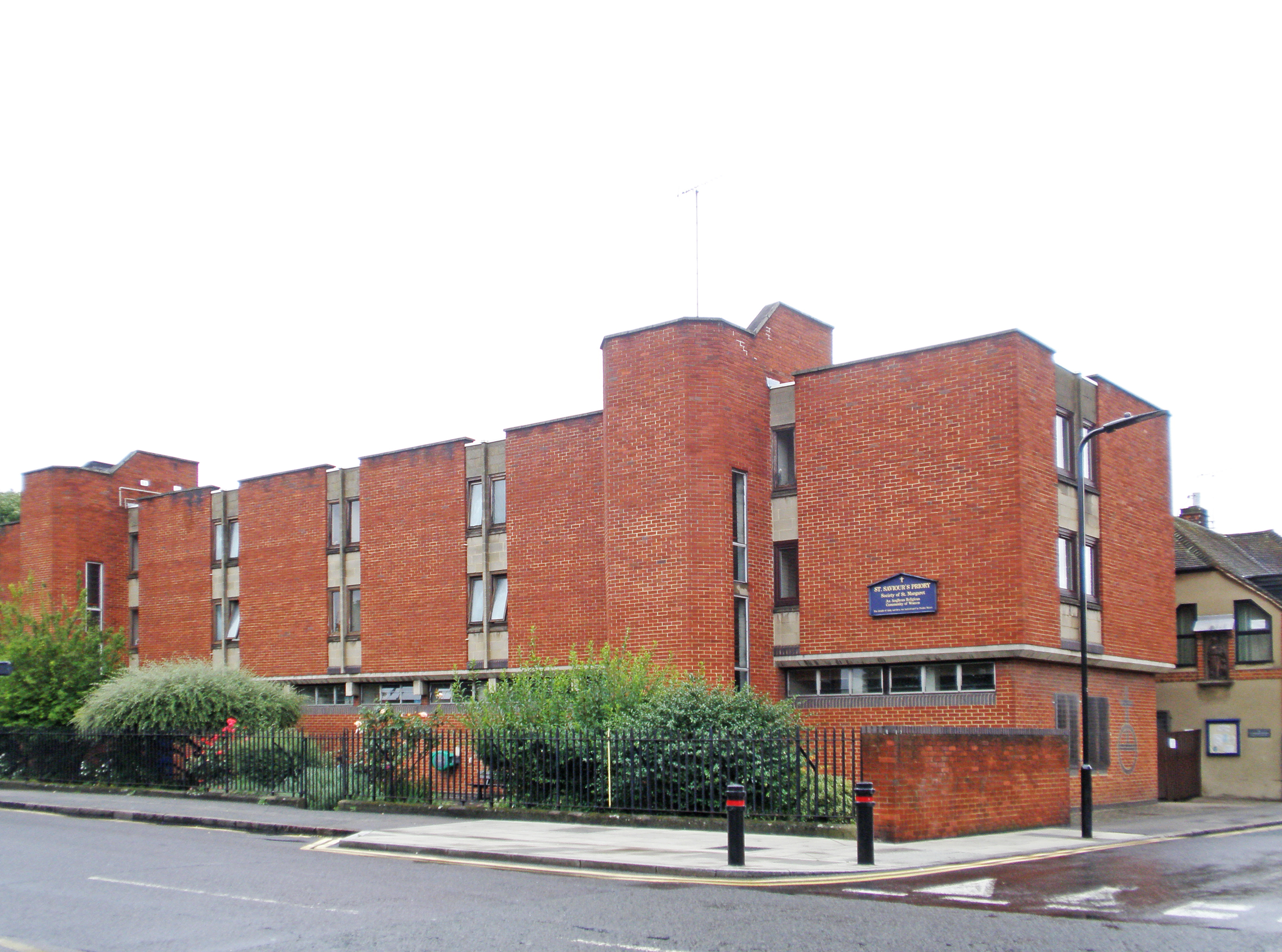
St Saviour's Priory, Haggerston

St Saviour's Priory, Haggerston, Hackney, is an autonomous house of the order, located in the East End of London. In 1866 a small group of sisters went to Haggerston to establish a daughter house. It was led by Mother Kate from 1868 until shortly before her death in 1923. The sisters have a ministry amongst marginalised groups, the homeless, alcoholics, and racial minority groups. Some sisters are involved in parish work. It was operating in 2023.

=== SSM (Chiswick, England) ===
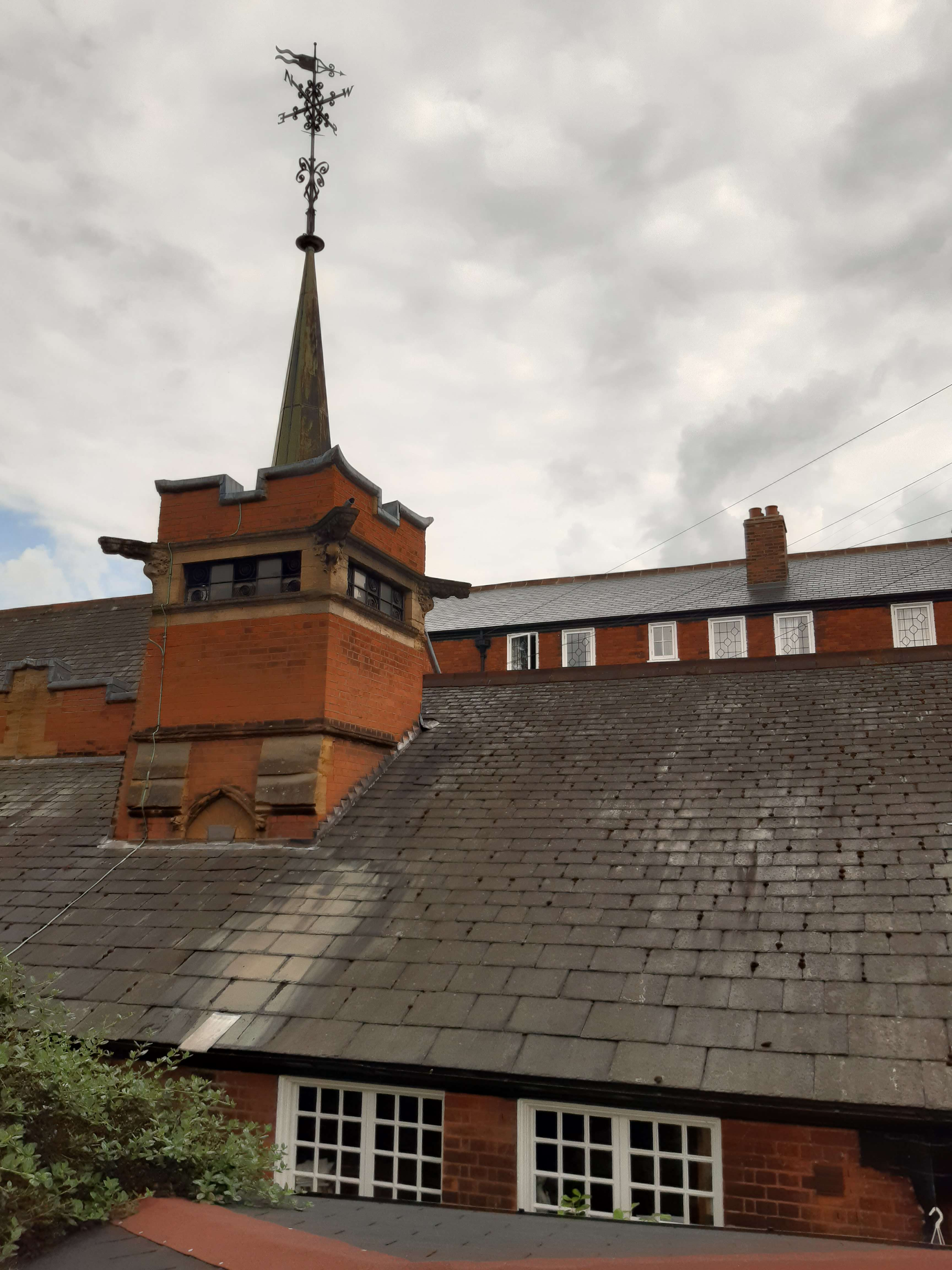
Chapel tower and weathervane, St Mary's Convent, Chiswick

St Mary's Convent, Chiswick (in west London) was formerly a dependent daughter house of the large autonomous SSM house in Uckfield (St Margaret's Convent, Hooke Hall, Uckfield, East Sussex). The order was originally dedicated to nursing the sick, and at Chiswick the Uckfield sisters went on caring for elderly women in a nursing home, and maintained a guest house. In 2015 St Margaret's Convent was closed, and most of the sisters relocated to the Chiswick daughter house, which has now become their mother house. Mother Jennifer Anne was commissioned as Reverend Mother on 2 March 2015. At Chiswick the sisters still operate the nursing home. A small daughter house has been retained in Uckfield.

In 1896, the Order of St Mary and St John built what is now St Mary's Convent and Nursing Home on Burlington Lane, Old Chiswick. At its core is an Arts and Crafts Gothic building by the architect Charles Ford Whitcombe. Its chapel has a small square tower with a weather vane atop a slender conical spire; inside the chapel is a classical reredos, ceiling paintings by George Ostrehan, and a tapestry panel by Morris & Co. The convent and hospital is Grade II listed.

There is a dependent daughter house at:

- Uckfield, East Sussex

=== SSM (Colombo, Sri Lanka) ===
St Margaret's Convent, Polwatte, Colombo, is a semi-autonomous house of the order. Technically still attached to the Uckfield sisters as a daughter priory, it is in the process of gaining independence. Sister Chandrani SSM is the local Sister Superior in Sri Lanka.

In 1887, three sisters from St Margaret's Convent in East Grinstead went to Ceylon on missionary work. After a short while, they established their convent in Polwatte, Kollupitiya. For many years they ran Bishop's College, Colombo.

The Sisters run a retreat house, a children's home (mainly for those orphaned in the civil strife), a hostel for young women, a home for elderly people, and are involved in parish work and church embroidery.

There is a dependent priory (and children's home) at:

- Moratuwa, Sri Lanka

=== SSM (Walsingham, England) ===
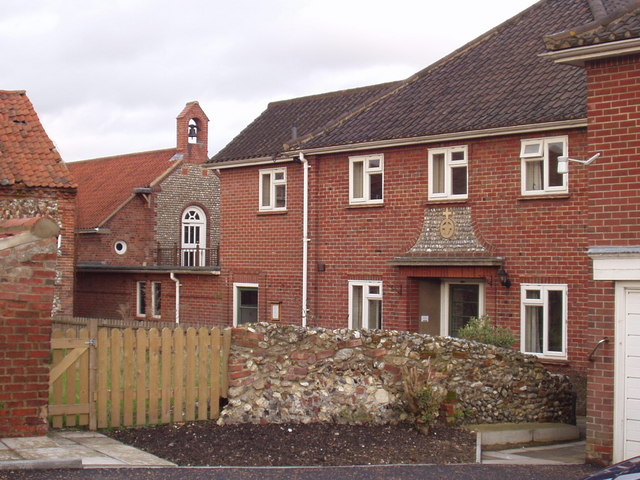
The Priory of Our Lady, Walsingham

In 1947 three Sisters from the house in Haggerston moved to Walsingham in Norfolk to help at the Anglican Shrine of Our Lady of Walsingham. The Priory of Our Lady, Walsingham, was founded in 1955 as a daughter priory, and gained independence as an autonomous house of the order in 1994. The superior is Sister Mary Angela SSM. The sisters welcome guests and work in the Shrine of Our Lady of Walsingham; they are also involved in educational work.

Three sisters left the Church of England in 2010 to join the Personal Ordinariate of Our Lady of Walsingham within the Roman Catholic Church.

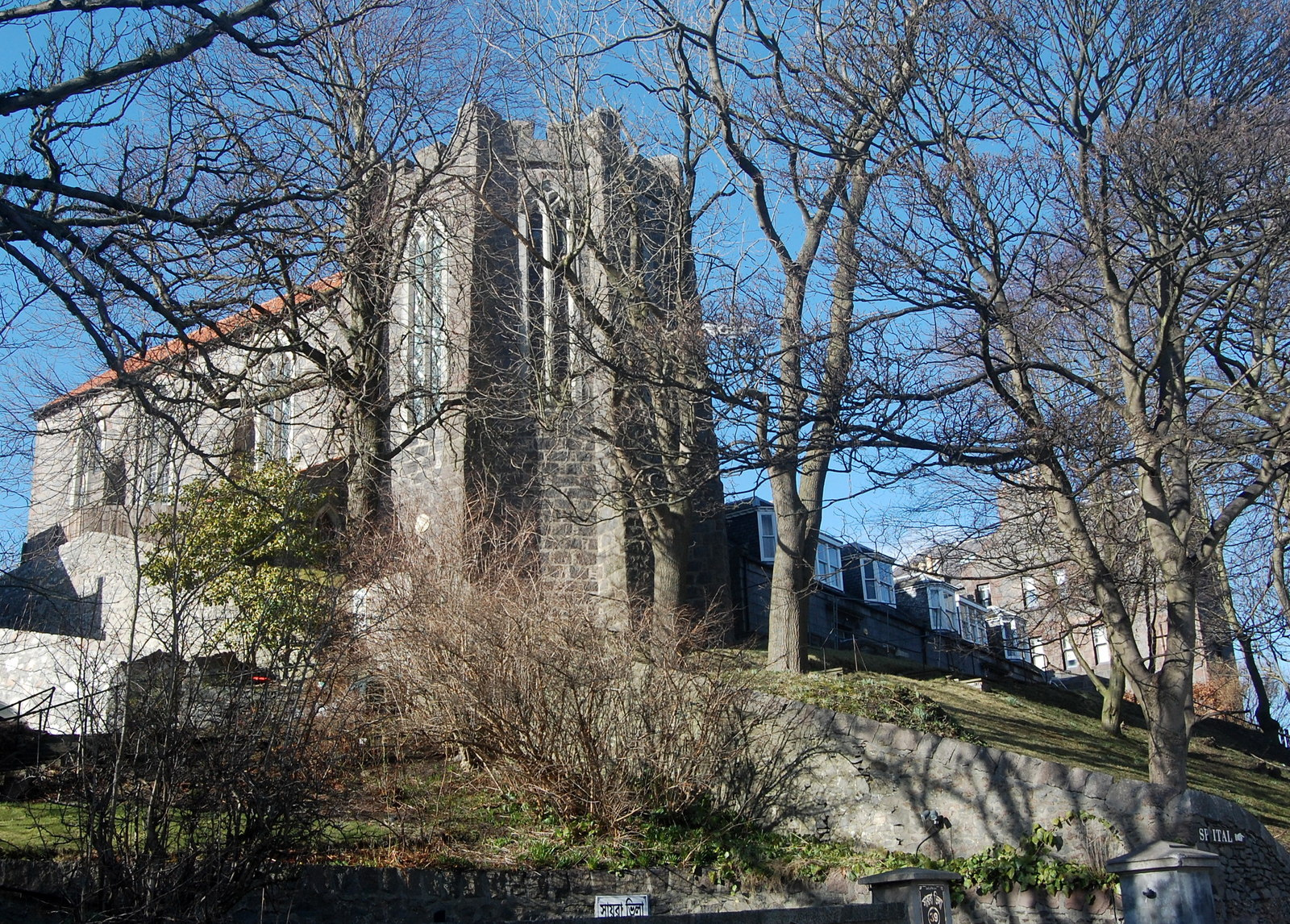
St Margaret's Episcopal Convent, Aberdeen

=== SSM (Aberdeen, Scotland) ===
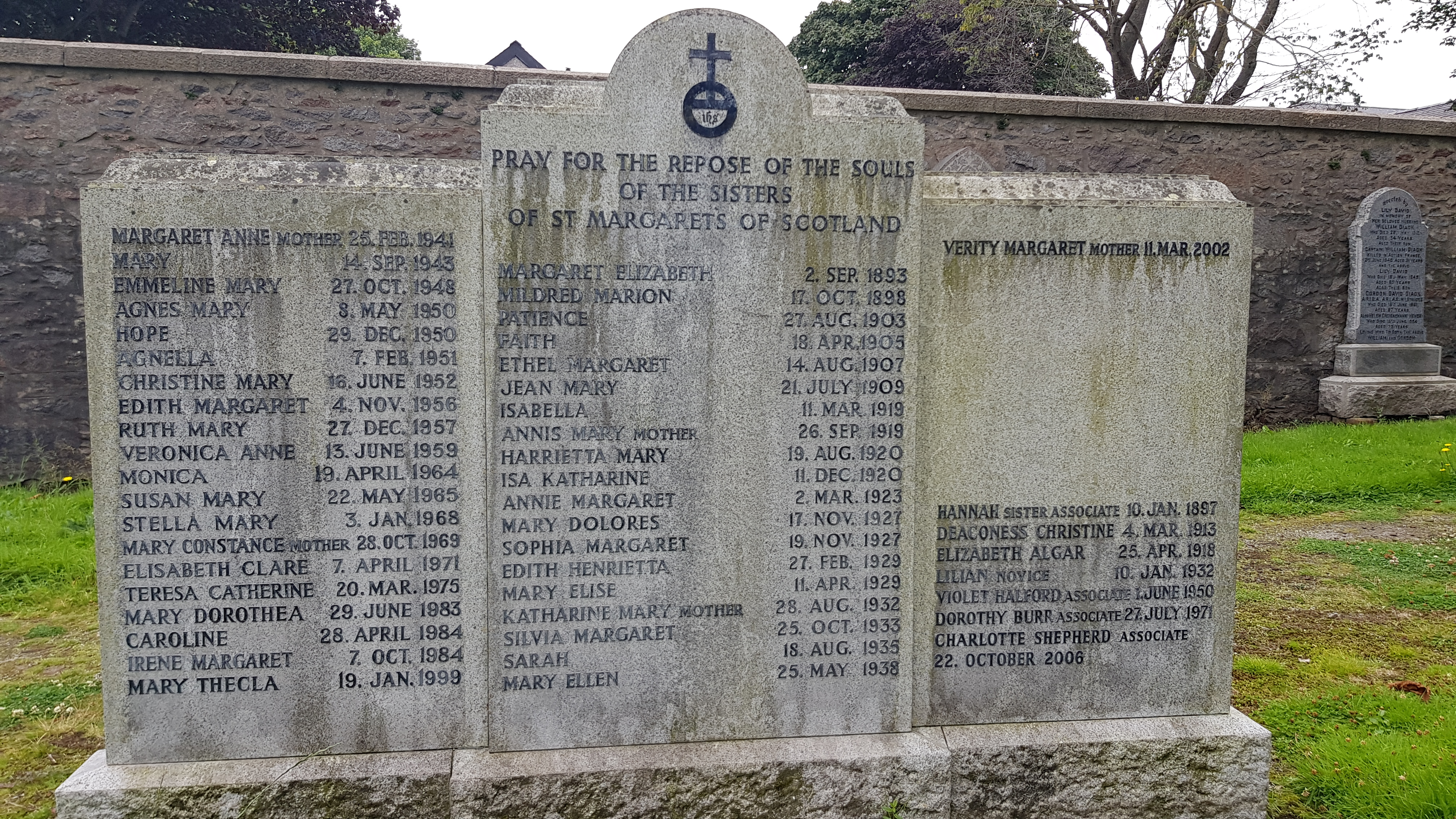
Memorial to the Aberdeen Sisters in St Peter's Cemetery, King Street, Aberdeen

In 1862 the order began operating in Aberdeen. Initially the convent operated from a house in Affleck Place, then from one on the Gallowgate. They moved to the Spital in 1882. Plans for a convent there, designed by Ninian Comper, were approved in 1891 and the building was completed in 1898. The buildings are listed as Category A by Historic Environment Scotland.

Mothers Superior, Aberdeen
1863	1867	Mother Christina
1867	1878	Mother Trevor (transferred to Boston, 1881, and later left community)
1878	1919	Mother Annis Mary (died 1919)
1919	1932	Mother Katharine Mary (Helen Katharine Ogilvie) (died 1932)
1932	1935	Mother Margaret Anne (died 1941)
1935	1965	Mother Mary Constance (died 1969)
1965	2002	Mother Verity Margaret (née Campbell) (died 2002)

The Episcopal Church in Gallowgate, Aberdeen, retains its dedication to Saint Margaret of Scotland and celebrates its historical ties to a convent of the order.

In 2002 the last Reverend Mother (Mother Verity Margaret SSM) died, leaving just two sisters. One transferred to Walsingham. In 2006, as there was only one sister remaining, the Diocese of Aberdeen and Orkney resolved to sell the convent buildings and the adjacent diocesan office which had for some time been unsuitable for purpose. Sister Columba (born Margaret Stewart, daughter of W. A. Stewart), was rehoused and negotiations regarding the sale of the building began. Sister Columba operated a chapel from a house on Cattofield Place, Aberdeen from 2006 to 2022. Sister Columba, who had moved to a local nursing home in autumn 2022, died on Holy Saturday (8 April) 2023, aged 96. The records of the Aberdeen convent are held by Aberdeen City and Aberdeenshire Archives.
