= W.A. Stewart =

English painter

W. A. Stewart FRSA
- Born: William Arnold Stewart; 17 July 1882; Ilkley, Yorkshire, England
- Died: 18 January 1953 (aged 70); High Wycombe. England
- Education: Royal College of Art
- Spouse: Kathleen Beardshaw

William Arnold Stewart, usually known as W.A. Stewart but also William A. Stewart, William Stewart or Will Stewart (17 July 1882 - 18 January 1953) was an artist and craftsman who reconstructed, from pieces thousands of years old, furniture found in the tomb of Queen Hetepheres near the Giza Pyramids. He was also an accomplished artist whose works were displayed at the Calton Gallery (Edinburgh, Scotland) in 1986, the Bradford Art Galleries (Cartwright Hall, Bradford, West Yorkshire, England) in 1989, and at the Royal Academy of Arts (London). He made great practical contributions to the light industries of Palestine before and during the Second World War.

== Early life and study ==
Will Stewart was born on July 17, 1882, in Ilkley, England the son of John Reich Stewart and Naamah (Arnold) Stewart. One of 5 children (2 brothers and 2 sisters), he attended the local school, then Bradford Technical College, then the Royal College of Art where he studied under Augustus John. He worked in the design department of Listers at Manningham Mills. He was a founder of the Loft Arts Club in 1902, which changed its name in 1912 to the Bradford Arts Club, and which encouraged poetry, literature, music, life drawings and other arts. During this time he was introduced to several influential people including Arnold Priestman, Ernest Sichel, William Shackleton, William Rothenstein, Edward Wadsworth, and Father O'Connor (GK Chesterton's 'Father Brown'), and he became good friends with artist James Arundel. He met the Indian poet and philosopher Rabindranath Tagore and created a pastel portrait that was exhibited in 1909.

Early in his life Stewart was a regular exhibitor of his pictorial photography. He was described by the British Journal of Photography in 1902 as 'amongst the best known exhibitors'. He exhibited widely in exhibitions in the United Kingdom including at the Photographic Salon and his work was published in Photographs of the Year in 1908 and 1909. Three examples of his work are in the Royal Photographic Society Collection including his photograph The Rose is Sweetness. His seems to have ceased exhibiting his photography around 1910, just before he moved to Egypt.

== Work in Egypt and Palestine ==
Will Stewart emigrated to the Middle East in 1911, to become an Inspector of Arts and Crafts in the Egyptian Ministry of Education. There he set up the Cairo School of Arts and Crafts, becoming its first principal. He was positively influenced by Arab, Turkish, Syrian and Byzantine art. Many students of the Cairo School of Arts and Crafts became accomplished artists. Some made fine jewelry to Stewart's designs including copies of ornaments worn by the ancient Pharaohs.

At the end of World War I, Stewart temporarily moved to Palestine to advise on the re-establishment of crafts and small industries damaged during the war. He worked with C.R. Ashbee, an architect and fine arts expert. Ashbee's wife Janet and 4 daughters, along with Janet's cousin Kathleen Beardshaw, moved from the UK to Palestine at this time. Will married Kathleen a year later in Cairo.

In 1927 the tomb of Queen Hetapheres, the Mother of Cheops who built the Great Pyramid, was discovered at Giza. Stewart was recruited by Professor Reisner of the Boston-Harvard expedition to make a painting of the interior of the tomb before anything was touched. Stewart was then asked to reconstruct the furniture in the tomb that had disintegrated. This included the Queen's throne, bed, chair, footstool, and neck rest that had been covered in fine gold leaf. Stewart discovered that the furniture was constructed using mortise and tenon joints. After nearly three years of work (mostly in a tent in the Giza desert, with one assistant), the pieces were displayed at the Cairo Museum. The many sketches, papers and notes made by Stewart on this project were discovered in a shed in Perthshire when his eldest daughter died in 1981. These were given to the Ashmolean Museum, Oxford.

According to his daughter Anne, "The furniture in the tomb was all intricately carved, then overlaid with gold. The wood had gone to dust, leaving the gold leaf gently collapsed. So he had to create new woodwork (knowing the traditional shapes from pictures in other tombs), then creating a sort of porridge-like mixture to cover it and lay the gold leaf on it somehow to make it all stand up as in the original carving."

After his work at the Cairo School of Arts and Crafts, in 1930 Will Stewart accepted a new post under the High Commissioner of Palestine as Supervisor of Technical Education. Along with his wife and 3 children he moved from Cairo to Jerusalem. The Governor of Sinai asked Stewart to take the journey via a new road that was just completed through the Sinai Desert and through Mitla Pass, and to write an article about the experience for the Egyptian press (The Sphynx magazine). His wife was the first woman to drive through Sinai.

Will Stewart recognized the special crafts that were part of the Palestine agricultural economy, such as wool products, copper cooking pans, pottery, goat-hair ropes, and reed mats. He created courses for teachers to include weaving, pottery, drawing, and woodwork. He set up a costume museum for display of the fine traditional clothing, which was fast disappearing in favor of modern clothes. He encouraged the skills of traditional garment makers, which were declining. He befriended musicians and was largely responsible for the formation of the Palestine Conservatory of Music, for which he was named the first chairman in 1933. The music students gave many concerts including performances at the Government House of the High Commissioner. Stewart was also involved with the reorganization of the Bezalel School of Art in Jerusalem.

During WW2, government priorities changed and Will Stewart was Controller of Light Industries. This work was focused on ensuring that the country produced as many of its own essentials as possible. After the war, Stewart was deeply saddened by the Arab-Jewish rift because he knew that each community had skills and ideas that could interest and benefit the other. He hated to see his work in this field move backward. Stewart worked with town planner C.R. Ashbee on the restoration of Jerusalem after the war, in 1918.

== Painting ==
Stewart was made a Fellow of the Royal Society of Arts in 1916. Works of Stewart including paintings and drawings of Egypt, Palestine, Jordan, France, Italy and Britain, were shown at the Edinburgh Festival 1986 at the Calton Gallery in Edinburgh. Among the works shown were "Boatman, Damietta, Cairo," 1927 oil on canvas; "Fountain Court, Jaffa," 1947 oil on canvas; and "Feast of the Nebi Musa (Shrine of Moses), Jerico," 1933 Gouache. "Feast of the Nebi Musa" was exhibited at the Royal Academy in 1938, No. 882. His works include scenes of life in Egypt, Palestine, and Jordan between 1914 and 1947, as well as paintings created during expeditions to Italy, Spain, Cyprus, England, Scotland, and France from 1907 until 1953. One of his paintings, "Men of the Trees in Palestine," was included in the Palestine Poster Project Archives. In 1948, Will Stewart retired to High Wycombe where he concentrated on his painting. He renewed his association with the Bradford Arts Club and was an art critic for The Yorkshire Herald. He had started to exhibit at Bradford's Cartwright Hall as early as 1906, both with the Arts Club and in his own right in The Bradford Spring Exhibition, a selected annual exhibition which showed the best of mainstream contemporary art. The titles of his pictures chart his move from typical Yorkshire subjects to the people and architecture of Palestine, along with the high-keyed oils and watercolors of his European trips. He effortlessly moved from portraiture to landscape, still life, and townscapes. Will Stewart continued painting until his death at High Wycombe in 1953.

== Life impact ==
An obituary was written by Keith Roach, a District Commissioner in Palestine, which included: "To the glassmakers of Hebron he introduced better methods of firing; to the weavers of Majdal he showed how their work could be improved by better looms; to the potters of Gaza and Ramallah he suggested fresh designs, and by himself turning out new types on the wheel, increased their sales. The workmen were astonished at his knowledge and skill, and admitted that he knew more of their craft than they did themselves. His colloquial Arabic, which never quite lost its Yorkshire burr, was readily understood, and with teachers and workmen alike he never failed to show patience and courtesy. It is small wonder that respect and admiration quickly developed into friendship and affection..."

Will Stewart's daughters Jean and Anne, and his granddaughter Niki Stewart, have followed in his footsteps as artists.
