= John D. Biggers =

British reproductive biologist (1923–2018)

John Dennis Biggers
- Born: 1923; Reading, Berkshire, England
- Died: April 7, 2018 (aged 94–95); Lexington, Massachusetts, United States
- Scientific career
- Fields: Reproductive physiology

John Dennis Biggers (/ˈbɪɡərs/; 1923 – April 7, 2018) was a British and American reproductive biologist and reproductive physiologist who helped pioneer in vitro fertilisation. He played a founding role in the scientific study of reproductive physiology, won many scientific awards for developing technology which would become central to human IVF, and engaged in public outreach regarding the ethics of artificial fertilisation.

== Early life and education ==
Biggers was born in 1923 in Reading, Berkshire, to Wilfred Norman Biggers, a chemistry and physics teacher, and Winnifred Gardner, a British Airways employee. Biggers studied veterinary science at the Royal Veterinary College. He subsequently shifted his focus to mammalian physiology, in which he earned a Ph.D. from the University of London.

== Development of IVF ==
After completing his graduate education, Biggers first worked at the University of Sydney, then in 1955 moved to St John's College, Cambridge under a commonwealth fellowship, and from there became a senior lecturer at the Royal Veterinary College. While lecturing at University College London in 1958, he coauthored a landmark Nature paper with Dame Anne McLaren, which for the first time reported the successful development and birth of mice cultivated in vitro. Professor Henry Leese of Hull York Medical School, writing for the Society for Reproduction and Fertility, labelled this "one of the most significant papers in the history of reproductive biology and medicine", and this development is widely considered a crucial milestone towards in vitro fertilisation in humans.

Biggers moved to the United States in 1959, working first at the University of Pennsylvania, moving to Johns Hopkins University in 1967, and finally becoming a professor at the Harvard Medical School in 1972. During this time, he worked on problems in embryo culture, embryo transfer, cryobiology, sperm preservation, and the statistics of experimental design. Biggers was a founding member and president of the Society for the Study of Reproduction, won several awards for his research from organizations like the Bedford Stem Cell Research Foundation, and authored more than 250 scientific papers. In addition to experimentation and mentoring, Biggers engaged publicly in ethical and policy advocacy regarding IVF technology. Howard W. Jones credited Biggers with providing critical support for the initiation of clinical IVF in the United States, which led to the first American baby being born by means of IVF. Biggers was regularly interviewed in the popular press on issues of reproductive ethics.

== Notable Awards ==
John Biggers received many awards and honors, the most notable being the Marshall Medal from the Society for the Study of Reproduction and the Pioneer Award from the International Embryo Technology Society.
