= Elizabeth Simpson (biologist) =

British biologist

Professor Elizabeth Simpson OBE FRS FMedSci
- Born: London, England
- Education: University of Cambridge
- Awards: OBE FRS FMedSci
- Scientific career
- Workplaces: Imperial College London

Elizabeth Simpson is a British biologist. She is the Emeritus Professor of Transplantation Biology at Imperial College London. Simpson is particularly known for her elucidation of the nature of male-associated minor transplantation antigens, and their roles in the generation of immunological tolerance, graft versus host disease, and transplant rejection.

== Life and education ==
Elizabeth Simpson was born in London, England. She obtained both her Bachelor's and Master's of Veterinary Medicine from the University of Cambridge. Immediately following her completion of education, she began working at a private practice in NB, Canada as a veterinary surgeon for two years. She then worked as a virologist in Ottawa for the Department of Health and Welfare. In 1966, she returned to Cambridge and served as an assistant lecturer in animal pathology for three years.

Simpson subsequently moved to Delhi, India and became a WHO consultant immunologist at the National Institute of Communicable Diseases. During her work in Delhi, India, she simultaneously worked for the National Institute for Medical Research (NIMR) in London, England as a research scientist. In the years following her work in India and for the NIMR, she has worked for several institutes, including her work as the head of the Transplant Biology Group at both the Medical Research Council's Clinical Research Centre in Harrow and the Clinical Sciences Centre at the Hammersmith Hospital. In addition, Simpson has done work for the National Cancer Institute, was the Deputy Director of the Clinical Sciences Centre at Imperial College, London, and continues to spend many summers at the Jax Laboratory in Maine. Although Simpson is a British biologist, she has made significant contributions to her field of work in both the United States and in England. She is currently working as the Emeritus Professor of Transplant Biology at Imperial College, London, and has held this position since 2004.

== Research ==
Simpson specializes in cellular immunology. She began her work with Peter Medawar in the late 1960's. Alongside him, she studied the immunology of graft rejection by observing the antigens found on grafts from male mice. With their research on the mice, Simpson and Medawar were able to discover the role of the genes found on the Y chromosome in rejection. She has made contributions to immunology by observing the interactions between T cells and Y chromosome antigens. Her studies in the area of minor histocompatibility antigens showed that male-specific cytotoxic T cells recognize self-MHC and products of genes on the Y chromosome. She carried out the molecular identification of the HY genes and the peptide epitopes they encode. Simpson's work has led to an increased understanding of immunological tolerance and graft acceptance/rejection, leading organ transplantation to become safer and more successful for patients. She is now using information to address fundamental questions, such as T cell-repertoire selection and immunodominance, and to devise models for investigating the modulation of in vivo haematopoietic stem cells.

== Awards and honours ==
- 1999 Fellow of the Academy of Medical Sciences
- 2000: OBE
- 2010: Honorary Fellow of the Royal College of Veterinary Surgeons
- 2010: Fellow of the Royal Society
- 2011: Honorary Member of the British Transplantation Society
- 2015: HonDSc from Imperial College
- 2019: "Outstanding Contribution to Science for Lifetime Achievements in Immunology and Inflammation" - Queen Mary University of London
