= Elizabeth Simpson Burke =

American missionary

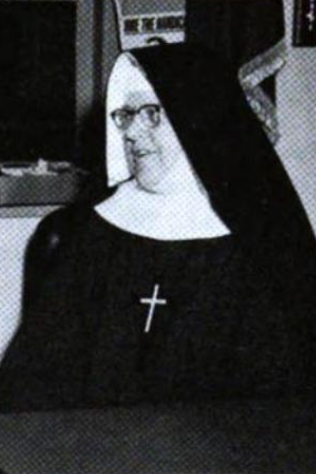
- Sister Joan Margaret, from a 1957 publication of the President's Committee on Employment of the Physically Handicapped
- Born: August 22, 1906; Merrimac, Massachusetts
- Died: December 16, 2005 (age 99); Brookline, Massachusetts
- Other names: Sister Joan Margaret
- Occupations: Anglican missionary and school administrator

Elizabeth Simpson Burke (August 22, 1906 – December 16, 2005), usually known as Sister Joan Margaret, was a member of the Anglican Society of Saint Margaret and a missionary in Haiti. She founded Saint Vincent Centre for Disabled Children in Port-au-Prince in the 1940s, and was the school's principal for decades.

== Early life and education ==
Elizabeth Burke was born in Merrimac, Massachusetts, the daughter of David W. Gardner and Adeline B. Hemmenway. She was raised Newburyport, Massachusetts by her adoptive parents, Robert Burke and Mabel Wood Simpson Burke. Robert Burke was an attorney, and mayor of Newburyport when Elizabeth was young. She trained as a physical therapist. She joined the Anglican religious order, the Society of Saint Margaret, in 1937.

== Career ==
Sister Joan Margaret did parish work in Utica, New York and at a mission in Bracebridge, Ontario. She arrived in Haiti in 1944 as a parish visitor, and opened a day nursery. Her work developed into the St. Vincent's School for Handicapped Children in the capital city, opened in 1945 and licensed in 1950. The school included dormitories, medical and dental clinics, and an orthopedics shop. She especially encouraged musical training, and led the school's orchestra and handbell choir on international tours. One of her students was violinist Romel Joseph.

Sister Joan Margaret accompanied students to the United States for medical treatment when needed. She toured in the United States, especially in Florida, speaking about her work at Episcopal Church events, to raise funds and awareness. "It's a life to live, not a work to be done," she explained of her vocation. In 1980, she and Harold Russell were honored by the Kessler Institute for Rehabilitation, for their work on behalf of disabled people.

== Personal life and legacy ==
Sister Joan Margaret had arthritis that required the use of crutches by the late 1970s, and she used a wheelchair by the mid-1980s. She retired from Haiti in 2003; she died in Brookline, Massachusetts in 2005, at the age of 99. Her school, now known as St. Vincent's Center for Children with Disabilities in Haiti, remains in operation, but at a new, more accessible site after the former buildings were destroyed, and several students died, in the 2010 Haiti earthquake.
