= Molecular Reproduction and Development =

- Discipline: Biochemistry, molecular biology, cell biology, developmental biology, reproductive biology
- Language: English
- Edited by: Harvey Florman

Publication details
- Former name(s): Gamete Research
- History: 1978–present
- Publisher: Wiley-Liss
- Frequency: Monthly
- Impact factor: 2.609 (2020)

Standard abbreviations
- ISO 4: Mol. Reprod. Dev.

Indexing
- CODEN: MREDEE
- ISSN: 1040-452X (print); 1098-2795 (web)

Links
- Journal homepage

Molecular Reproduction and Development is a peer-reviewed scientific journal that publishes research articles on developmental and reproductive biology. The journal was established in 1978 under the name Gamete Research and the current name was adopted in 1988. The editor-in-chief is Ivan Cunha Bustamante-Filho (Biotechnology Graduate Studies Program, Universidade do Vale to Taquari, Brazil). According to the Journal Citation Reports (Clarivate), the journal has a 2023 impact factor of 2.7.
