= List of multiple births =

List of different multiple births throughout history

This is a list of multiple births, consisting of notable higher order (4+) multiple births and pregnancies. Twins and triplets are sufficiently common to have their own separate articles. With the use of reproductive technology such as fertility drugs and in vitro fertilization (IVF) such births have become increasingly common. This list contains only multiple births which have some claim to notability, such as being the first recorded in a country, the first to survive to adulthood in a country, the heaviest, lightest or longest lived (globally), or having had substantial media coverage.

== Cases by number ==
=== Quadruplets (4) ===
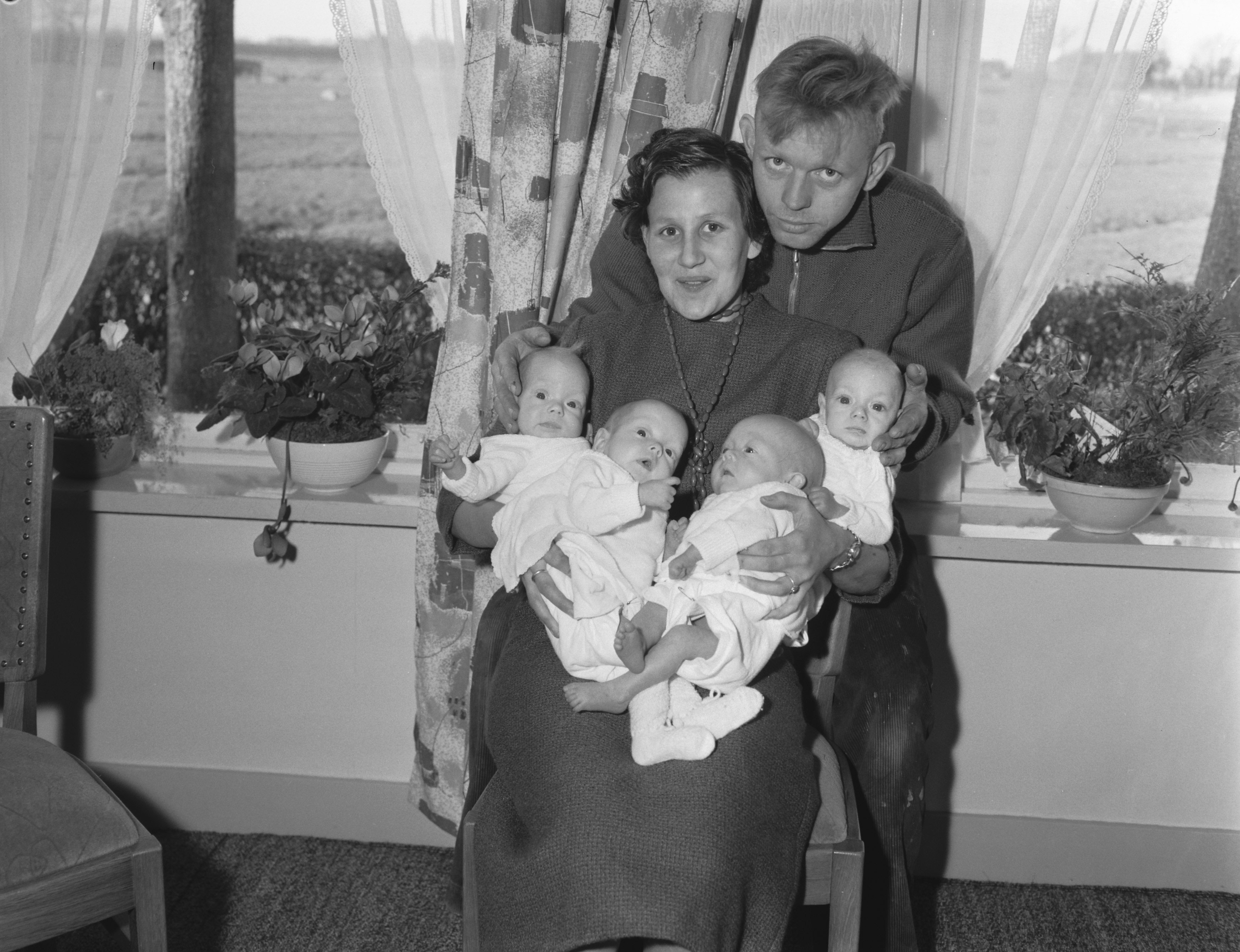
Infant quadruplets in the Netherlands in 1959

- The Smith quadruplets, born 1750 in Kinsale, Ireland, to a fisherman's wife.
- The Fisk quadruplets (born 26 August 1783), in Killingly, Connecticut, United States. Two boys (Ephraim and Joseph) and two girls (Keziah and Mary) all survived to adulthood.
- Dominica, 1790: According to The Times, a Dr. Giuseppe of Dominica reported that an unnamed Afro-Dominican woman (enslaved servant) living on the estate of Thomas Jemmitt gave birth to four girls, three of them almost eighteen hours after the first was born. All survived birth.
- The Rigby quadruplets (born 15 August 1817 in Norwich, Norfolk). The babies were named Primus John, Secundus Charles Henry, Tertius Robert Palgrave and Quarta Caroline Susan. All died in infancy, Secundus on 2 September 1817,< Tertius on 12 October 1817, Primus on 3 November 1817, and Quarta on 5 November 1817. On 24 December 1817, the Court of Aldermen presented their parents, Dr Edward Rigby and Mrs Anne Rigby (nee Palgrave), with a silver bread basket with the children's names engraved on it.
- The Gehri quadruplets (born 26 September 1880, in Switzerland) were the first recorded to have survived to adulthood. There were two boys (Oskar and Arthur) and two girls (Bertha and Rosa).
- The Page quadruplets (born 8 January 1890, in Redwater, Texas, US) were the first recorded quadruplets born in the United States.
- The Keys quadruplets (born 4 June 1915, in Hollis, Oklahoma, US) were the first same-sex quadruplets known to survive to adulthood. They attended Baylor University on scholarships and graduated in 1937. Roberta Keys Torn, the last surviving sister, died at 96 years in August 2011.
- The Mahaney quadruplets (born 25 December 1923, in Saint John, New Brunswick) were the first quadruplets born in Canada known to survive to adulthood.
- The Morlok quadruplets (born 1930 in Lansing, Michigan). The girls were the first known surviving set of identical quads and were later anonymised as the Genain quadruplets in psychiatric studies of genetic links to schizophrenia.
- The Johnson quadruplets (born in 1935 in Dunedin, New Zealand) were the first surviving set of quadruplets in Australasia.
- The Miles quadruplets (born on 28 November 1935 in St Neots, United Kingdom) are the oldest living quadruplets in the world; they became known as the St Neots Quads. All were still alive past their 85th birthday.
- The Badgett quadruplets (born 1 February 1939, in Galveston, Texas, US) were the second surviving set of quadruplets in the United States. The four girls, Geraldine, Joan, Jeanette, and Joyce, were minor celebrities in the 1940s and 1950s.
- The Fultz quadruplets (born 23 May 1946, in Rockingham County, North Carolina) were the first identical African-American quadruplets on record.
- The Sara quadruplets (born 17 August 1950, in Bellingen, New South Wales) were the first surviving quadruplets in Australia. There were two boys, Mark and Philip, and two girls, Alison and Judith.
- The Alexander quadruplets (born 2 September 1967, in Auckland, New Zealand) were the first set of identical quadruplets born in New Zealand.
- The Steeves quadruplets (Carrie Dawn, Jennie Lee, Mary Beth, and Patty Ann, born 17 December 1982, in Calgary, Alberta) were the first identical set of quadruplets to be born in Canada.
- The Durst quadruplets (Calli, Kendra, Megan, and Sarah) are identical quadruplets born 10 February 1993, in Robbinsdale, Minnesota, US. They appeared on the reality television series Four of a Kind.
- The Brino quadruplets (born 21 September 1998, in Woodland Hills, California, US) played the twins Sam and David Camden on the television series 7th Heaven. When they all started to look different, the only girl, Myrinda, stopped appearing on the show. Only Nikolas and Lorenzo starred on the show until the series ended in 2007.
- The Aberdeen/Edwards quadruplets (born 7 November 2006, in San Juan, Trinidad and Tobago) are four girls, born to Lystra Aberdeen (aged 27 and mother to a 10-year-old girl, an 8-year-old boy, and a 4-year-old boy) and her common-law husband Anderson Edwards (aged 33). This was the first confirmed case in Trinidad.
- Aditi, Aakriti, Akshiti and Aapti are quadruplets born in Chennai, Tamil Nadu. They appeared in the Tamil film Enna Satham Indha Neram (2014).
- The Sinirakthrap quadruplets (Idea, Iva, Ida, and Aira) are the first recorded identical quadruplets born in Thailand.

=== Quintuplets (5) ===
- The Lyon quintuplets (born 29 April 1896) were the first American quintuplets who were all born alive. The last one survived until May 1896, all having starved to death.

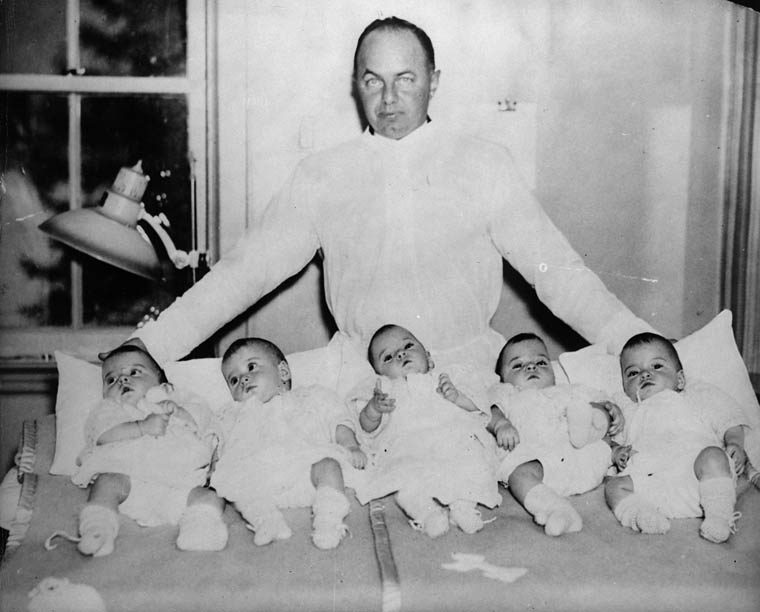
The Dionne sisters January 21, 1935, with then-Premier of Ontario Mitchell Hepburn

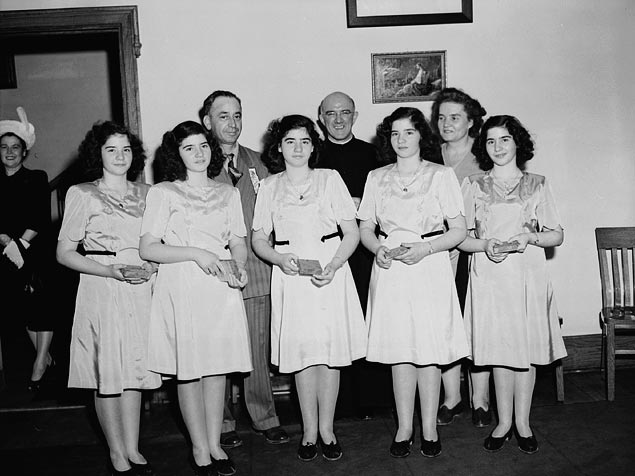
The Dionne sisters in 1947 with their parents

- The Dionne quintuplets (born 28 May 1934, near Corbeil, Ontario, Canada) were the first quintuplets known to survive infancy. The five girls (Yvonne, Annette, Cecile, Emilie and Marie) were also the only set of identical quintuplets known to live into adulthood.
- The Diligenti quintuplets were born to Franco (or Jaime) and Ana Diligenti on 15 July 1943, in Argentina and were the second quintuplets to survive infancy and the first ever in South America. They included three girls, Maria Esther, Maria Fernanda, and Maria Cristina, and two boys, Carlos and Franco.
- The Prieto quintuplets, all boys, were born 7 September 1963, in Maracaibo, Venezuela, to Ines and Efren Prieto.
- The Fischer quintuplets (born 14 September 1963, in Aberdeen, South Dakota, US) were the first known surviving set of American quintuplets. They consisted of one boy and four girls. 3 of the 4 girls are identical: Magdalene, Margaret, and Catherine.
- The Lawson quintuplets (born 27 July 1965, in Auckland, New Zealand) were the first set of surviving quintuplets conceived through the use of fertility medication and are the only known New Zealand quintuplets: They were one boy (Samuel) and four girls (Deborah, Lisa, Shirlene and Selina). Shirlene (later Colcord), was the first of the quintuplets to marry. She was also the first to die, on 18 June 2019, aged 53.
- The Braham quintuplets (born 31 December 1967) were the first quintuplets to be born in Australia. They were conceived naturally and born to Pat and Roger Braham of Tenterfield, New South Wales. In birth order, they were Annabel Dorothy, Richard Gibson, Faith Elizabeth, Caroline, and Geoffrey Raymond. Geoffrey died at 4 days old; the others are still living.
- The Hanson quintuplets (born 13 November 1969, in London) were the first set to survive in the United Kingdom, as well as the second surviving set of all-girl quintuplets after the Dionne quintuplets.
- The Kienast quintuplets (born 24 February 1970, in Liberty Corners, New Jersey) were the first surviving set of American quintuplets conceived through fertility medication.
- The Rychert quintuplets (born 15 May 1971, in Gdańsk) were the first surviving set born in Poland.
- The Brunner quintuplets (born 9 June 1978, in Nancy) were the first surviving set born in France. Marc, Luc, Gilles, Maud, and Anne were nicknamed "Paris Match quintuplets" and clothed by designer Pierre Cardin, in 17 articles written from 1978 to 1984. For each article, they were clothed by the couturier Pierre Cardin.
- The Granata quintuplets (born 1 June 1981, in Toledo, Ohio, US) were three boys and two girls conceived through the use of fertility medication and born at 28 weeks to Janice and George Granata. They were named (in birth order) Britton, Nathan, Amanda, Heather, and Eric. Britton died of lung failure on June 3, 1981. In 1983, the surviving four appeared with Oprah Winfrey on her show, People are Talking, along with their mother and their older sister Jenny. At age 15, the four appeared on The Jenny Jones Show.
- The Gaither quintuplets (born 3 August 1983, in Indianapolis, Indiana, US) were the first surviving African-American quintuplets and were one of only three naturally-conceived American sets in 1983.
- The Al-Ghamdi quintuplets (born 2 February 1988, in Jeddah, Saudi Arabia) were the first set to be born in Saudi Arabia. The 5 boys were born to Salha and Saeed Al-Ghamdi.
- The Chapman-Burgess quintuplets (born 13 May 1992 in Brisbane, Australia) are the only known set of Indigenous Australian quintuplets. Born to Adele and Ian Chapman-Burgess, they grew up in the regional town of Glen Innes, New South Wales. They consist of 2 boys and 3 girls (Jack, Louis, Erika, India and Georgia).
- The Nur Adlan quintuplets were born in Kuala Lumpur, Malaysia, on 20 May 1996. The three girls and two boys were the first set of Malaysian quintuplets to survive infancy.
- The Chin quintuplets were born in Singapore on 1 April 1997. The two boys and three girls (Adriel, Alicia, Amanda, Annabelle and Andre) were the first quintuplets to be born in Singapore.
- The Cassidy quintuplets were born in Dublin, Ireland, on 16 August 2001, to Veronica and Kevin Cassidy of Wexford. The three boys (Conor James, Cian Richard, and Rory Kevin) and two girls (Amy Dorothy and Dearbhail Mary) were the first quintuplets to be born in Ireland.
- The Gonzalez-Moreno quintuplets were born in Phoenix, Arizona, on 26 April 2005, to Luisa Gonzalez and Enrique Moreno via surrogate mother, Teresa Anderson. The five boys are the first set of quintuplets born via surrogate. The boys, in order of birth, are Enrique, Jorge, Gabriel, Javier, and Victor and weighed between 3 lb 7oz and 3 lb 15oz.
- The Artamkin quintuplets were born in Oxford, England, on 10 November 2007, to Dimitri and Varvara Artamkin via Cesarean section. They were the first set of quintuplets born to Russian parents.
- The Kroščen quintuplets were born in Prague, Czech Republic, on 2 June 2013, to Alexandra Kiňová and Antonín Kroščen of Milovice. The four boys (Michael, Deniel, Martin, and Alex) and one girl (Tereza) were the first recorded quintuplets to be born in the Czech Republic. They have one older brother, Antonio.
- The Busby quintuplets were born on 8 April 2015, in Houston, Texas, to Adam and Danielle Busby. The five girls (Ava Lane, Olivia Marie, Hazel Grace, Riley Paige, and Parker Kate) are the first set of all female quintuplets born in the United States. Ava and Olivia are identical twins, and the quintuplets have an older sister, Blayke. The Busby quintuplets and their family are featured on the TLC reality series OutDaughtered, which premiered on 10 May 2016.

=== Sextuplets (6) ===
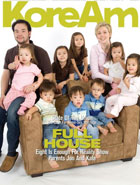
The Gosselin sextuplets with family on the cover of the May 2008 KoreAm

- The Bushnell sextuplets (born 8 September 1866 in Chicago, Illinois, US) were born to Winnie and James Bushnell. They are the first documented sextuplets born in the USA. Two died within a year, but the other four survived into adulthood.
- The Thorns sextuplets (born 2 October 1968, in Birmingham, England) were born to Sheila and Barry Thorns. They were the first sextuplets known to have been born alive in the United Kingdom, but one baby died shortly after birth, and another two died within the next two weeks.
- The Letts sextuplets (born 15 December 1969, in London, England) were born to Rosemary and John Letts two months prematurely at University College Hospital. One female was stillborn, and one boy and four girls survived: Cara Dawn, Sharon Marie, Joanne Nadine, Gary John, and Tanya Odile. This was the second case of surviving quintuplets in the United Kingdom. The family immigrated to Canada in 1974.
- The Stanek sextuplets (born 16 September 1973, in Denver, Colorado) were born to Edna and Eugene Stanek seven weeks premature at the University of Colorado Medical Center, four boys and two girls. One of the girls, Julia Stanek, died two days later, but the other five children (Steven, Catherine, John, Jeffrey, and Nathan) survived infancy.
- The Rosenkowitz sextuplets (born 11 January 1974, in Cape Town, South Africa) were the first sextuplets known to survive their infancy. They were conceived using hormone fertility drugs.
- The Nijssen sextuplets (born 21 September 1977, in the Netherlands) were born to Corry and Sien Nijssen two months prematurely. There were four girls (Patricia, Priscilla, Mirella, and Ramona) and two boys (Ivo and Dennis). Dennis died on 9 November 1977. They are the only set in the Netherlands.
- The Giannini sextuplets (born on 11 January 1980, in Italy) were the second sextuplets known to survive their infancy. They were born on the same date as the Rosenkowitz sextuplets, six years later.
- The Vanhove Gadeyne sextuplets (born on 17 August 1983, in Blankenberge, Belgium) were the first set of sextuplets to have been born in Belgium. The five boys (Bruno, Jelle, Tom, Lode, Arne) and one girl (Veerle) weighed between 2 lbs 9oz and 3 lbs 3oz at birth.
- The Walton sextuplets (born on 18 November 1983, in Liverpool) were the first sextuplets born in the United Kingdom known to survive their infancy, and the world's first all-female sextuplets. They were delivered by caesarean section at 31 and a half weeks.
- The Adam sextuplets (born on 14 January 1989 in Paris) were the first surviving set of sextuplets in France. They are four girls (Gaelle, Mélanie, Doriane, Coralie) and two boys (Cédric and Kevin). Their parents were under fertility treatments at the time of conception.
- The Dilley sextuplets (born on 25 May 1993, in Indianapolis, Indiana, US) were the first surviving set of sextuplets in the United States. They are two girls (Brenna Rose and Claire Diane) and four boys (Julian Emerson, Quinn Everett, Ian Michael, and Adrian Reed).
- The Boniello sextuplets (born 24 March 1997, in Stony Brook, New York, US) set a record for the longest gestation of a sextuplet pregnancy in the United States at 29 weeks and one day. They have a younger sister, Nadia. This record was broken later in 1997 by the Thompson sextuplets.
- The Thompson sextuplets (born 8 May 1997, in Washington, D.C., US) were born to Jacqueline and Linden Thompson. Mrs. Thompson set a record for the longest sextuplet pregnancy in the United States at 29 weeks and six days. One girl was stillborn; the five survivors are four girls (Octavia Daniela, Stella Kimberly, Ann Marie Amanda, and Emily Elizabeth) and one boy (Richard Linden). They are the first African-American sextuplets. They each weighed between 2 lbs 2oz and 2 lbs 6oz.
- The Harris sextuplets (born 7 July 2002, in Alabama, US) are two girls (Kiera Christine and Kalynne Antoinett) and four boys (Kaleb Reddrick, Kobe Byshari, Kieran Anthony, and Kyle Jacob). They are Alabama's first set of sextuplets and were the first recorded set of surviving African-American sextuplets. Kaleb has nerve damage; while Kiera and Kyle have autism. The Harris family received a new home in a 2005 episode of Extreme Makeover: Home Edition. The Harris' original three-bedroom, three-bath house was razed and a two-story, 5,000-square-foot (460 m^{2}) home was built.
- The Gosselin sextuplets (born 10 May 2004, in Hershey, Pennsylvania, US) were born just shy of 30 weeks gestation to parents Jon and Kate Gosselin. The set has three girls (Alexis Faith, Hannah Joy, and Leah Hope) and three boys (Aaden Jonathan, Collin Thomas, Joel Kevin). The parents also have twin girls, Madelyn Kate and Cara Nicole, who were three years old at the time of the sextuplets' birth. The family was the subject of a reality television show, originally titled Jon & Kate Plus 8, that aired on TLC in the United States and Canada. The show was initially canceled after Jon and Kate's divorce, but was revived as Kate Plus 8 after viewer complaints. The series ended in 2011, with the last episode airing on 12 September of that year, then resumed with a new season in January 2015.
- The Hayes sextuplets (born 14 September 2004, in Long Branch, New Jersey, US) are the first surviving sextuplets to be born in New Jersey. The six children, three girls (Tara Rose, Rachel Ann, Rebecca Mary) and three boys (Ryan Peter, Connor James, Eric John Jr.), weighed a total of 24 lbs. and 14 oz., setting a world record for the heaviest set of sextuplets. The Hayes also have two sets of twins, Kevin and Kyle (eight years old at the time of the sextuplets' birth) and Kieran and Meghan (five years old). They are the only family in the United States to have two sets of twins and a set of sextuplets. The family was the subject of a reality television show, Table for 12, on TLC in the U.S.
- Canada's first sextuplets (born 6–7 January 2007 in Vancouver) were born at 25 weeks gestation. Two of them died shortly after birth.
- The Carpio sextuplets (born 6 October 2008, in the New York City borough of Queens) are the first Hispanic sextuplets to be born in America. It is not known if their parents, Victor and Digna Carpio, conceived using fertility treatments. The babies (Justin, Jadon, Jezreel, Danelia, Genesis, and Joel) were delivered by Caesarean section at 25 weeks. They were the subject of a reality television show, Sextuplets Take New York.
- The Conway sextuplets (born on 22 May 2009 in Dunmore in County Tyrone, Northern Ireland) were the first recorded sextuplets in Ireland. The four girls and two boys weighed between 1 lb. 7 oz. and 2 lb. 2 oz. were fourteen weeks premature and were named Ursula, Shannon, Karla, Kerrie (died 20 July 2009), Austin and Eoghan.
- On 4 March 2013, the first sextuplets in Trinidad and Tobago and the Caribbean were born at the Maternity Hospital of the Eric Williams Medical Sciences Complex at Mount Hope, Trinidad and Tobago, to an anonymous Trinidadian couple. Two of them died a few weeks later.
- The Marzec sextuplets (born on 20 May 2019 in Kraków) were the first recorded sextuplets in Poland.
- On 21 October 2021 the first ever sextuplet birth was reported in Sri Lanka. A 31-year-old mother from the Angoda area gave birth to 3 boys and 3 girls at Ninewells hospital in Colombo.

=== Septuplets (7) ===
- The Frustaci septuplets (born 21 May 1985, in Orange, California, US) are the first septuplets to be born in the United States. Born at 28 weeks, only two boys and one girl survived; one daughter was stillborn and three died within 19 days of birth.
- The McCaughey septuplets (born 19 November 1997, in Des Moines, Iowa, US) are the world's first surviving set of septuplets. The four boys (Kenneth Jr., Brandon, Nathan, and Joel) and three girls (Alexis, Natalie, and Kelsey) were born at 31 weeks, weighing between 2 lbs. 5 oz. and 3 lbs 4 oz. In 2015, they became the first set of septuplets to reach the age of majority.
- The Humair septuplets (born 14 January 1998, in Abha, Saudi Arabia) were the world's second surviving set of septuplets. They were born at 32 weeks to 40-year-old Hasna Mohammed Humair and her husband, Abdullah Mohammed Ali. They had been told to expect four babies.
- The Qahtani septuplets (born 12 July 2001, in Washington, D.C., US) are the third set of septuplets to live past the day of their birth. In December 2001, it was reported that one of the septuplets had died of liver failure, and three were still hospitalized.
- A set of septuplets was born on 18 April 2007, in a suburb of Algiers, Algeria, to Farhat and Souhila Touile. One of the babies, a boy, was stillborn; the remaining six are girls.
- The Khamis septuplets (born 16 August 2008, in Alexandria, Egypt) were born to 27-year-old Ghazala Khamis. They were the fifth set of septuplets to all survive. The newborns, four boys and three girls, had been placed in incubators in four different hospitals since they were premature. The babies' weights ranged from 1.45 to 2.8 kilograms (3.2 to 6.2 lb). The mother took fertility drugs in order to produce a son, since she already had three daughters.
- The McGhee septuplets (born 9 June 2010, in Columbus, Ohio, US) were born to Mia and Rozonno McGhee at 27 weeks. One girl was stillborn. The other two girls (Olivia and Madison) and the four boys (Rozonno Jr., Elijah, Isaac, and Josiah) had birthweights ranging from 1.5 lb. to a fraction over 2 lbs.

=== Octuplets (8) ===
- The first confirmed birth of octuplets occurred on 10 March 1967, in Mexico City, Mexico, to Maria Teresa López de Sepúlveda. All four boys and four girls died within 13 hours.
- A set of octuplets was born on 16 August 1979, to Pasqualina and Stefano Chianese in Naples, Italy. Six of the babies died, and two survived. The couple had previously lost a set of sextuplets in 1976.
- A set of octuplets was born on 20 December 1985, to Sevil Capan of İzmir, Turkey. Born prematurely at 28 weeks, six of the octuplets died within 12 hours of birth, and the remaining two died within three days.
- A set of octuplets was born between 30 September – 2 October 1996, in a hospital in South London, United Kingdom, to Mandy Allwood of Solihull. Allwood was only 19 weeks pregnant when she went into pre-term labor with her six boys (Adam, Cassius, Donald, Kypros, Martyn, and Nelson) and two girls (Layne and Kitali). All babies died after a few days. She had refused selective reduction, and her case provoked a media storm in the UK. Allwood died of cancer in February 2022, aged 56.
- A set of octuplets was born on 5 December 1996, in Huelva, Spain, to Rosario Clavijo. Two of them were stillborn, and six survived.
- The Chukwu octuplets were born in December 1998 in Houston, Texas, United States. The smallest of the octuplets, Odera, died a week after birth.
- A set of octuplets was born between 13–16 September 2000, in Milan, Italy, to Mariella Mazzara and Giovanni Pierrera of Trapani. One died immediately after birth; two within a few days of birth; and the oldest, Margherita, died a month later on 10 October.
- The Suleman octuplets (born 26 January 2009, in Bellflower, California, United States) were the world's first set of octuplets to survive infancy. One week after birth, the Suleman octuplets became the longest-living octuplets in known history. They were conceived through IVF. The children, named Noah, Maliyah, Isaiah, Nariyah, Makai, Josiah, Jeremiah and Jonah, have six older siblings, including a set of fraternal twins.

=== Nonuplets (9) ===
- A set of nonuplets was born on 13 June 1971, in Sydney, Australia, to Geraldine Brodrick and her husband, Leonard. They were five boys and four girls; two of the boys were stillborn, and the last of the surviving babies, a boy named Richard, died five days after the birth. Mrs Brodrick had two older daughters, Belinda and Jacqueline, both single births.
- A set of nonuplets was born on 26 March 1999, in Malaysia to Zurina Mat Saad. She had five boys and four girls (Adam, Nuh, Idris, Soleh, Hud, Aishah, Khadijah, Fatimah, and Umi Kalsom), but none of them survived more than 6 hours.
- A set of nonuplets was born on 4 May 2021, in Morocco to Malian couple Halima Cissé and Abdelkader Arby. They had five girls (Kadidia, Fatouma, Hawa, Adama and Oumou) and four boys (Mohammed VI, Oumar, Elhadji and Bah), all of whom initially appeared to be healthy. The couple also has an elder daughter, Souda (b. 2019). A year later, BBC News reported that the nonuplets were all in perfect health on their first birthday. In 2026, the nonuplets celebrated their fifth birthday.

== Unconfirmed or debunked cases ==
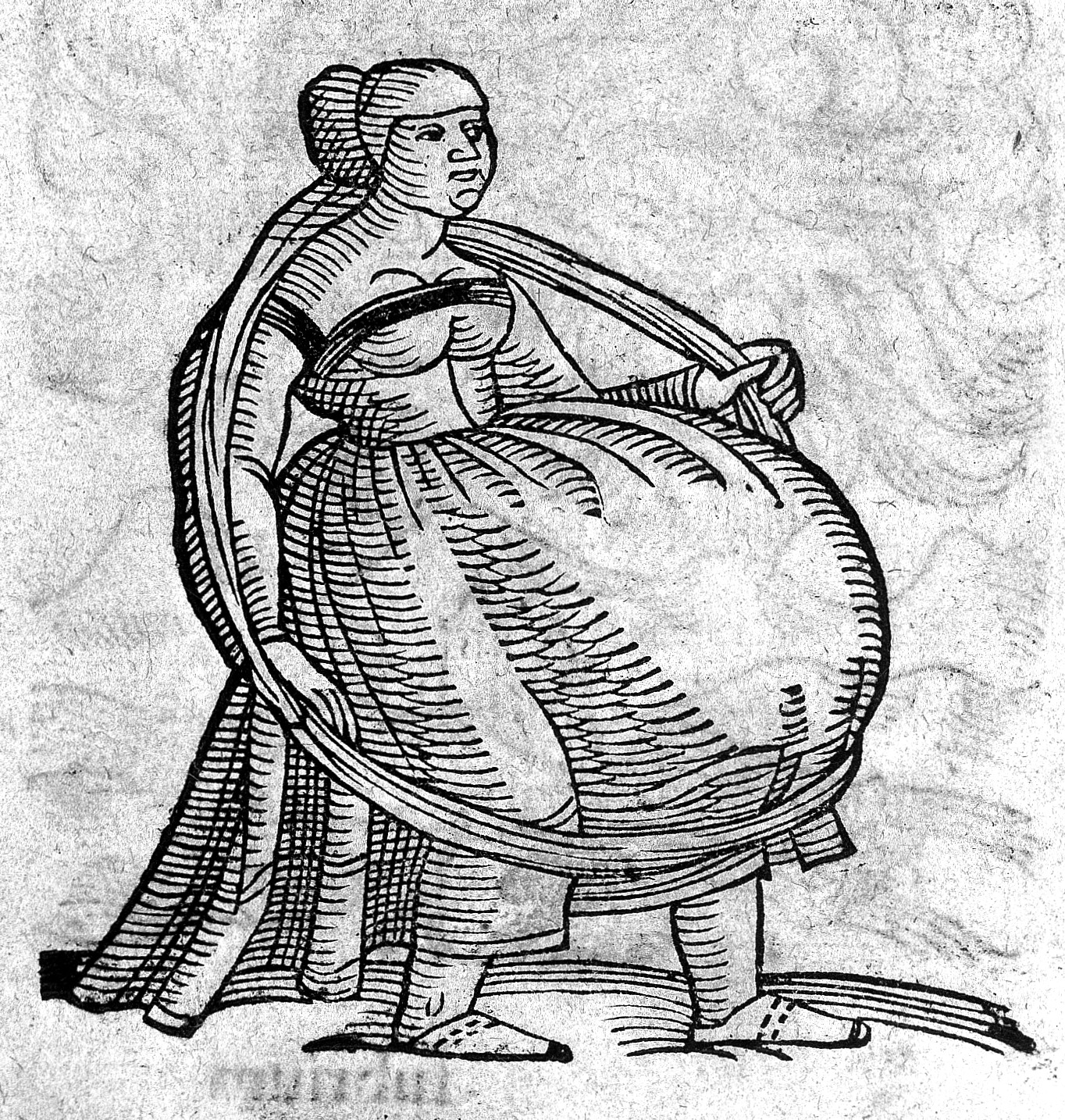
Dorothea in the Prodigiorum ac ostentorum chronicon

- German woman Barbara Stratzmann (died 1503) is said to have been pregnant 29 times, carrying 18 singletons, five sets of twins, four sets of triplets, and having one set each of sextuplets and septuplets. Of those 53 kids, 19 were stillborn and the oldest lived to the age of eight. The credibility of those claims have been disputed by scholars. If, however, these numbers corresponded with reality, she would have been the woman with the most children in Germany (or equivalent historical states) of all time.
- In Conrad Lycosthenes' 1557 book Prodigiorum ac ostentorum chronicon, an Italian woman, Dorothea, is quoted as reportedly having borne 20 children in two pregnancies, the first time bearing nine children and the second time 11.
- The 1991 Guinness Book of Records reported three cases of decuplets, in Bacacay, Brazil (two boys and eight girls) on 22 April 1946, in Spain in 1924, and in China on 12 May 1936.
- In June 2021, a South African woman from Johannesburg, Gosiame Thamara Sithole, claimed to have given birth to a set of decuplets (seven boys and three girls) and gained media attention. The claim was later debunked as the Gauteng Provincial government had released a statement saying that medical tests showed that she had not given birth recently, nor had she even been pregnant.

== See also ==
- List of people with the most children
