= Nabatanzi =

Nabatanzi is a surname. Notable people with the surname include:

- Alice Nabatanzi (born 1988), Ugandan researcher
- Diana Nabatanzi (fl. 2017), Ugandan film entertainer
- Mariam Nabatanzi (born c. 1980), Ugandan woman known for birthing 44 children
