= Feodor Vassilyev =

Russian father of 87 children (c. 1707–1782)

- Born: c. 1707; Shuya, Ivanovo Oblast, Tsardom of Russia
- Died: 1782 (aged 74–75); Shuya, Ivanovo Oblast, Russian Empire
- Spouse: Valentina Vassilyeva
- Children: 87 in total (allegedly)

Feodor Vassilyev (Russian: Фёдор Васильев, romanized: Fyodor Vasilyev, older spelling: Ѳеодоръ Васильевъ, Theodor Vasilyev; c. 1707 – 1782) was a peasant from Shuya, Russia. His first wife, Valentina Vassilyeva, is said to have lived to be 76, and between 1725 and 1765, had 69 children (16 pairs of twins, 7 sets of triplets, and 4 sets of quadruplets); 67 of them survived infancy (with the loss of one set of twins). This is the world record for the most children born to a single woman. However, their names, dates of birth, and dates of death are all unknown.

Vassilyev said he also had 18 children with his second wife (6 pairs of twins and 2 sets of triplets), making him allegedly a father of 87 children in total.

The data about Vassilyev's children are included in the Guinness Book of World Records.

== Sources ==
The first published account about Feodor Vassilyev's children appeared in a 1783 issue of The Gentleman's Magazine (Vol. 53 p. 753, London, 1783) and states that the information "however astonishing, may be depended upon, as it came directly from an English merchant in St Petersburg to his relatives in England, who added that the peasant was to be introduced to the Empress". The same numbers were given in Ivan Nikitich Boltin 1788 commentary on Russian history and in an 1834 book by Alexander Pavlovich Bashutskiy, Saint Petersburg Panorama.

== Skepticism ==
Several published sources raised doubts as to the veracity of these statements. According to a 1933 article by Julia Bell in Biometrika, a 1790 book of B. F. J. Hermann Statistische Schilderung von Rußland did provide the statements about Feodor Vassilyev's children but "with a caution". Bell also notes that the case was reported by The Lancet in an 1878 article about the study of twins. The Lancet article states that the French Academy of Sciences attempted to verify the statements about Vassilyev's children and contacted "M. Khanikoff of the Imperial Academy of St. Petersburg for advice as to the means they should pursue, but were told by him that all investigation was superfluous, that members of the family still lived in Moscow and that they had been the object of favors from the Government". Bell concludes that Vassilyev's case "must be regarded as under suspicion".

Similarly, in her book Quadruplets and Higher Multiple Births (1989), Marie Clay of the University of Auckland notes: "Sadly, this evasion of proper investigation seems, in retrospect, to have dealt a terminal blow to our chances of ever establishing the true detail of this extraordinary case".

== See also ==
- List of multiple births
- List of people with the most children
