= Valentina Vassilyeva =

Russian prolific mother (1707–1782)

- Born: 1707; Shuya, Ivanovo Oblast, Tsardom of Russia
- Died: 1782 (aged 74–75); Shuya, Ivanovo Oblast, Russian Empire
- Spouse: Feodor Vassilyev
- Children: 69

Valentina Vassilyeva (1707 – 1782) was a woman from Shuya, Russia. She was the first wife of Feodor Vassilyev, who was said to have fathered 87 children; 69 with Valentina between 1725 and 1765 (16 pairs of twins, 7 sets of triplets, and 4 sets of quadruplets). According to Guinness World Records, this is the world record for the most children born to a single woman.

== Life and death ==
Vassilyeva was born in about 1707, possibly in Shuya, Ivanovo Oblast, Russia.

Vassilyeva gave birth for the first time in 1725. Between the years 1725 and 1765, she is said to have had 27 pregnancies and to have given birth to 16 pairs of twins, 7 sets of triplets, and 4 sets of quadruplets; 67 are said to have survived infancy out of 69 total. The names of the children along with their dates of birth and death are all unknown. Calculations tally that Vassilyeva was pregnant for a total of 18 years throughout the 40 years. According to documents published in Quadruplets and Higher Multiple Births by Marie M. Clay, Valentina Vassilyeva lived to 75 and died in the same year as her husband in 1782, in Shuya, Ivanovo Oblast, Russia.

The first complete account recorded of the 69 births was reported in Moscow by the Monastery of Nikolsk on February 27, 1782. The first published account appeared in a 1783 issue of The Gentleman's Magazine. The author wrote: "In an original letter now before me dated St Petersburg, Aug 13, 1782, O. S. Feodor Wassilief, aged 75, a peasant, said to be now alive and in perfect health, in the Government of Moscow, has had by his first wife 4 x 4 = 16, 7 x 3 = 21, 16 x 2 = 32, 27 births, 69 children. By his second wife 6 x 2 = 12, 2 x 3 = 6, 8 births, 18 children.” The account was published again in a 1788 commentary on Russian history and in the 1834 book by Alexander Pavlovich Bashutskiy, Saint Petersburg Panorama.

There have been suggestions that the account has been misrepresented over time. Some have proposed that the husband fathered that many children but had multiple wives over several years who were only referred to as “Mrs. Vassilyeva.”

== Medical debate ==
Although Guinness World Records confirmed the births, many in the medical world have doubted the possibility in 1700s Russia; a period of history in which data reveals over a quarter to nearly half of all children died in infancy. Director of the Division of Reproductive Science and Women's Health Research at Johns Hopkins University, James Segars, said in a BBC interview: "In the past, every pregnancy was a risk to the mother's life. Even if you had four sets of quads today, I'm not sure they'd all survive." Northeastern University professor Jonathan Tilly additionally points out that it is highly unlikely for the time that Vassilyeva could have had so many multiple births: "Even just the 16 sets of twins? I'd be shocked."

Author Marie Clay writes: "Sadly, this evasion of proper investigation seems, in retrospect, to have dealt a terminal blow to our chances of ever establishing the true detail of this extraordinary case". An article in an 1878 issue of The Lancet stated: "the French Academy of Sciences attempted to verify the statements about Vassilyeva's children and contacted "M. Khanikoff of the Imperial Academy of St. Petersburg for advice as to the means they should pursue, but were told by him that all investigation was superfluous, that members of the family still lived in Moscow and that they had been the object of favors from the Government".

== Alleged photographs ==
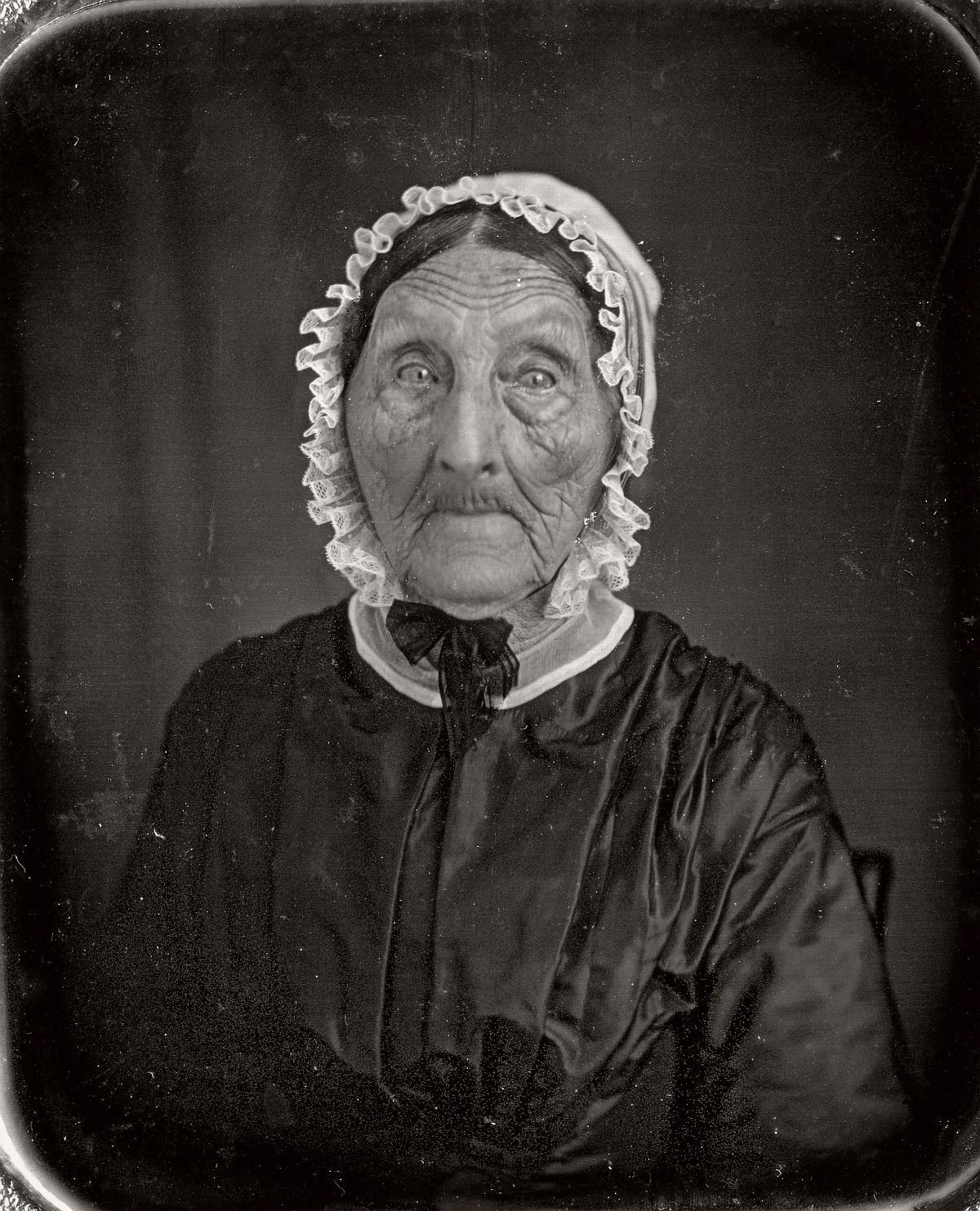
Photograph of unknown woman c. 1840 misassociated with Valentina Vassilyev

An alleged photograph of Valentina Vassilyeva has been accompanying the story of her multiple births online for several years. However, since Vassilyeva died in 1782, some 44 years before the first photograph was taken in 1826, it is impossible for this claim to be true. The actual photograph is of an unknown elderly woman from New York around 1840–1845.

Another photograph attributed to Vassilyeva and her children began circulating the internet in 2012 when the website Top 10 Lists incorrectly captioned the image. According to the fact-checking website Snopes, the photograph is actually from a 1904 issue of the Utah Historical Quarterly depicting Joseph F. Smith, the sixth president of the Church of Jesus Christ of Latter-Day Saints, posing with his multiple wives and children.

== See also ==
- List of multiple births
- List of people with the most children
- Sex differences in human physiology
