= List of people with the most children =

This is a list of women said to have given birth to 20 or more children and men said to have fathered more than 25 children.

== Mothers and couples ==
This section lists mothers who gave birth to at least 20 children. Numbers in bold and italics are likely to be legendary or inexact, some of them having been recorded before the 19th century. Due to the fact that women bear the children and therefore cannot reproduce as often as men, their records are often shared with or exceeded by their partners.

Total children birthed	Mother or couple (if known)	Approximate year of last birth	Notes
69	Valentina and Feodor Vassilyev	1765	A Russian woman named Valentina Vassilyeva and her husband Feodor Vassilyev are alleged to hold the record for the most children a couple has produced. She gave birth to a total of 69 children – sixteen pairs of twins, seven sets of triplets and four sets of quadruplets – between 1725 and 1765, a total of 27 pregnancies. 67 of the 69 children were said to have survived infancy. Allegedly, Vassilyev also had six sets of twins and two sets of triplets with a second wife, for another 18 children in eight pregnancies; he fathered a total of 87 children. The claim is disputed as records at this time were not well kept.
57	Mr and Ms Kirillov	1755	The first wife of peasant Yakov Kirillov from the village of Vvedensky, Russia, gave birth to 57 children in a total of 21 births. She had four sets of quadruplets, seven sets of triplets and ten sets of twins. All of the children were alive in 1755, when Kirillov, aged 60, was presented at court. As with the Vassilyev case, the truth of these claims has not been established.
53	Barbara and Adam Stratzmann	1498	It is claimed that Barbara Stratzmann (c. 1448–1503) of Bönnigheim, Germany, gave birth to 53 children (38 sons and 15 daughters) in a total of 29 births by 1498. She had one set of septuplets, one set of sextuplets, four sets of triplets and five sets of twins. Nineteen of the children were stillborn, while the eldest surviving lived to be eight years old.
44	Mariam Nabatanzi Babirye	2016	Mariam Nabatanzi from Uganda gave birth to 44 children (43 survived infancy) by the age of 36. This included 3 sets of quadruplets, 4 sets of triplets and 6 sets of twins, due to a rare genetic condition causing hyperovulation. In 2019, at the age of 40, she underwent a medical procedure to prevent any further pregnancies. As of April 4, 2023 she had a total of 38 surviving children (16 females and 22 males), having lost 6.
42	Elizabeth and John Mott	1720	Elizabeth Mott of Monks Kirby, Warwickshire, married in 1676 and produced 42 live-born children. She died in 1720. There are not good records for this as it was in the 18th century.
41	Alice Hookes	1553	According to the inscription on a gravestone in Conwy Church cemetery, Gwynedd, North Wales, Nicholas Hookes (died 1637) was the 41st child of his mother Alice Hookes.
39	Elizabeth and William Greenhill	1681	Thomas Greenhill was the last child of 39 by his mother Elizabeth (1615–1681) and William Greenhill. The family consisted of 7 sons and 32 daughters. Not only is this a large number of live newborns, but is unusual in that all but one pair of twins were single births.
35	Ms and Mr Harrison	1736	Ms Harrison, the wife of an undertaker residing in Vere Street, London, gave birth to her 35th child by one husband in 1736.
33	Mary and John Jonas	1892	Mary Jonas (1814–1899) gave birth to 33 children, including 15 sets of boy–girl twins. All were christened, but few reached adulthood. Ten children were still alive when their father John died in 1892.
33	Moddie and Purcell Oliver	1959	Ms Moddie Mae Oliver, aged 50, wife of a Lumberton, North Carolina, sharecropper, was expecting her 33rd child in 1959. At that time, 22 of her children were alive.
32	D. Aleixo de Sousa da Silva e Meneses, 2nd Count of Santiago de Beduído, and D. Leonor Maria Josefa de Meneses	c. 1700-1730	From Lisbon, Portugal. Not every child survived into adulthood.
32	Maria Addolorata Casalini	1970	Ms Casalini (born 1929) of Brindisi, Italy, married at 17 and gave birth to her 32nd child on 11 November 1970. She had two sets of quadruplets, one of triplets, one of twins and nineteen single births. Only 15 children survived.
32	Madalena and Raimundo Carnauba	1961	Madalena Carnauba of Ceilândia, Brazil married at 13 and gave birth to 32 children: 24 sons and 8 daughters.
32	Maria Benita Olivera	1989	Ms Olivera (born 1939) of San Juan, Argentina, gave birth to her 32nd child on 31 January 1989. All children were believed to be alive at that time. She was married twice, and gave birth to a set of triplets when she was 13. She later gave birth to two sets of twins.
30	Rebecca Town	1851	Ms Town (1807–1851) of Keighley, Yorkshire, had 30 children, but only one reached age 3.
29	Mary Alice Carey and Samuel Peter Swartwood	1899	Mary Alice Carey married Samuel Peter Swartwood on April 28, 1871, in Luzerne County, Pennsylvania, at the age of twelve. Family has 29 children, She gave birth to her first child at age fifteen and had 29 children over 27 years.
28	Griffith and Elizabeth Johnson	1790	Elizabeth G Johnson was born in 1732 in Montgomery, Maryland. She married Griffith Johnson on 16 February 1766, in Annapolis, Maryland. They had 28 children in 31 years. She died on 30 January 1790, in Oldtown, Maryland, at the age of 58, and was buried there.
28	Mabel Murphy	1949	Ms Murphy (born 1898) of Lisnaskea, Co. Fermanagh, N. Ireland was reported to have given birth to 28 children (12 stillborn) in 32 years of marriage by December 1949, but this claim has not been fully substantiated.
27	Irene (née Cooke) and James Arthur Robinson	1936	Ms Robinson of Oyen, Alberta gave birth to her 27th child in 1936. She had 27 children, including six sets of twins in a 24-year period. Eleven children died as babies.
27	Marie-Elise Chamberland and Heliodore Cyr	1959	Marie-Elise Chamberland and Heliodore Cyr married in 1928 and gave birth to 27 children by 1959, all single births. 19 of them survived to adulthood. Mr Cyr, a potato farmer from Saint-François-de-Madawaska, New Brunswick, appeared on the TV show I've Got A Secret three times – after the births of his 25th, 26th and 27th children.
26	Marilouise (Landry) and William Croteau	1919 (c.)	Marielouise and William Croteau had 26 children in St. Patrice-de-Beaurivage, Québec including six sets of twins. Two died as infants, one at 10 months, and one at four years. 21 survived to adulthood. The last to survive was Madeleine Croteau Houle who lived to be 102 and died on January 31, 2021.
25	Wéber Andrásné Szirotek Teréz	1899	Ms Wéber (b. 30 September 1855) of Csömör, Hungary gave birth to 25 children between 1872 and 1899. She was awarded with a silver medal on 20 August 1930 on the 'Magyar anyák nemzeti ünnepe' (Hungarian Mothers National Day).
25	Lapa Piagenti and Giacomo di Benincasa	1347 (c.)	Their 23rd child was Saint Catherine of Siena.
25	Ada Watson	1931	Ms Watson (1886–1974) of Cambridge gave birth to 25 children, including three sets of twins, during the period 1904–1931. All of the children attained majority.
24	Catherine Ngin Kit Chit (Oct 4, 1904-Oct 12, 1993) and Joseph Goh Yong Twang (Jun 15, 1896-Dec 16, 1956) of Singapore	1951	Mrs. Ngin Kit Chit (Catherine) gave birth to 24 children while married to Mr. Goh Yong Twang (Joseph), all single births. They had enough male children to have a football (soccer) team.
24	Kathleen Scott	1958	Ms Scott (b. 4 July 1914) of Dublin gave birth to her 24th child on 9 August 1958. Twenty of her children were still alive in 1990.
23	Christine of Mecklenburg-Güstrow and Louis Christian, Count of Stolberg-Gedern	1705	The great-great-great-grandmother of Queen Victoria of the United Kingdom had 23 children in 19 pregnancies between 1684 and 1705 (including four sets of twins); 11 of them survived to adulthood.
23	Queen Darejan and King Heraclius II of Georgia	1807 (c.)	They had a total of 23 children, 13 of whom lived to adulthood.
23	Tabatha Marcum and Silas Mainord	1811 (c.)	Married in 1811, they lived in Overton County, Tennessee, and produced 23 children. One of their daughters, Syreana, later became the mother of 17.
23	Grace Bagnato	1938	Grace Bagnato and her husband had 23 children; nine of them were conceived in order to compete for a bequest by a Toronto eccentric, in what became known as the Great Stork Derby.
23	Irene and Charles DeMello	1958	Irene DeMello of Tiverton, Rhode Island, gave birth to her 23rd child in February 1958 at the age of 40 in her 25 years of marriage. There were no multiple births. Seventeen of the children were alive, the eldest being 23.
23	Mary and Sylvester Hemsing	1951 (c.)	Mary Hemsing (1913–2014) of Rolling Hills, Alberta, Canada, gave birth to 11 boys and 12 girls, one of whom was stillborn.
23	Alina and Juho Tyni	1955	A couple in Taivalkoski, Finland had 23 children. Two of them died very young.
22	Lady Emily FitzGerald	1778	Emily FitzGerald, Duchess of Leinster and her first husband James FitzGerald, 1st Duke of Leinster, had nineteen children born between 1748 and 1773. Later she married her children's tutor William Ogilvie; they had three children, who were born between years 1775 and 1778.
22	Ms and Mr Hostetter	1941	Roy Hostetter, a 46-year-old Pennsylvania miner, and his wife, aged 42, announced the birth of their 22nd child in May 1941.
22	Charlotte and Marlon Story	1946	Charlotte Story of Bakersfield, California, gave birth to her 22nd child in July 1946. At the time, 19 of the other 21 children, including four sets of twins, were alive. Marion and Charlotte Story participated in You Bet Your Life in 1950.
22	Mrs Mabel Renata	1948	Mrs Mabel Renata, a Maori, of Hawkes Bay, New Zealand, gave birth to her 22nd child in November 1948. Fourteen of her children survived, including the second born, who was 21 at the time she gave birth to the 22nd, and was himself a father.
22	Madeleine and Marce Devaud	1952	Madeleine Devaud, wife of a village dairyman of La Gorre, western France, gave birth to her 22nd child, a boy, in March 1952, at the age of 42. The Devaud couple, married for 24 years, had 13 girls and seven boys. Two other children died in infancy.
22	Mary Chaloner Hale	1789	The wife of General John Hale (1728–1806), Mary Hale (1743–1803, born Mary Chaloner in Guisborough, Yorkshire, England) bore 22 offspring between the years of 1765 and 1789, including her first child, John Hale.
22	Mabel Constable	1950 (c.)	Ms Constable (born 1920), of Long Itchington, Warwicks, gave birth to 22 children, including a set of triplets and two sets of twins.
22	Margaret McNaught	1945 (c.)	Ms McNaught (born 1923), of Balsall Heath, Birmingham, gave birth to 22 children, 12 boys (2 of them died in infancy) and 10 girls, all single births.
22	Effie (née Estes) and Charles Dickey	1914 (c.)	From Clinton, Maine, Ms Dickey gave birth to 22 children, all single births. All of them lived to adulthood, with 18 of them living at least 70 years of age (the others died at ages 30, 58, 60 and 67).
22	Unidentified Romani woman	1998	A 38-year-old Romani woman of Lom, Bulgaria, gave birth to her 22nd child in March 1998. She and her husband had no jobs. 17 children lived with them and five were in orphanages.
22	Alice (née Spencer) & John Jennings	1660 (c.)	Jennings was an MP of St. Albans before the English Civil War. He names 3 of these children in his will, dated 1642, and his wife's will names 7 of them, dated 1663. Their granddaughter was Sarah Churchill, Duchess of Marlborough.
22	Sue and Noel Radford	2020	Sue (Suzanne) Radford has given birth to 22 children as of April 2020, 11 boys and 11 girls, all single births. Alfie (their 17th) was stillborn. At this time, their eldest son (Christopher) is 30 years old. They have six grandchildren. They have a bakery which is the family business and live in Morecambe, United Kingdom. All of them are healthy and thriving. The Channel 5 TV series 22 Kids and Counting documents their lives.
22	Alvin and Lucille Miller	1966	Alvin and Lucille resided in Waseca, Minnesota, where Lucille gave birth to 22 children and they cared for several more. Their daughter Helen Miller recounted her experiences in the memoir "21 Siblings: Cheaper by the Two Dozen".
21+	Mary Susannah Roberts (née Sautelle) and John Roberts	1749 (c.)	18th-century Irish architect and his wife. Of their children, said to number 21 or 24, only eight survived to adulthood, including the painters Thomas Roberts and Thomas Sautelle Roberts.
21	Johanna O'Sullivan and William O'Daly	1837	They had 21 children in 29 years, 6 sons and 15 daughters, born between 1808 and 1837 in Gurrane, Currans, County Kerry, Ireland. There were no multiple births, and all of the children were born alive – it is likely that there were a number of stillborn children too. Four children died in childhood, and the last child, Bridget Russell, died in 1923. Descendants of Johanna and William include Commandant General Charlie Daly, Senator Mark Daly, Senator Lorraine Clifford-Lee, and Siobhán Fleming, captain of the Munster Women rugby team.
21	Barbara Bremner and Thomas Burns	1978	Barbara and Thomas resided in Rogers Park on the north side of Chicago. Barbara gave birth to 21 single birth live children. She had her first daughter in 1951, and last in 1978. They supported their children on Tom's salary as an electrician, and Barbara ran a secretarial and phone-answering service, called Barb's Wire, from her home for many years. All 21 children reached adulthood.
21	Olivia (née Whitmore) and Arthur Guinness	1783	Guinness was an Irish brewer. Only ten of their children lived to adulthood.
21	Ann Clark Skerrett and Jeremiah Lear	1812	Their 20th child was English artist, illustrator, musician, author and poet Edward Lear (born 1812).
21	Olivia (née Gutenberger) and Rudolph Schoelzel Sr.	1949	They had 21 children in 24 years, 11 sons and 10 daughters, born between 1925 and 1949 in Colby, Wisconsin, USA. There were no multiple births. One son died in infancy in 1947, and one son also died in 1947, aged 21.
21	Domitille (née Brun) and Pierre Martin	1861	They had 21 children in 25 years, 11 sons and 10 daughters, born and baptized between 1835 and 1861 in Saint-Cyprien-de-Napierville, Québec, Canada. There were no multiple births.
21	Teodora (née Lopez) and Raymundo Olivas	1853 (c.)	Born in 1809 in Los Angeles, Raymundo Olivas met his future wife, Teodora Lopez, in Santa Barbara. They were married in 1832, and together they had 21 children – 13 boys and eight girls. In 1841 Raymundo built the Olivas Adobe, an important part of Ventura city's cultural heritage.
21	Josephine & Michael Salzo Sr.	1923 (c.)	The 21 children included the first known surviving set of quadruplets in New Haven, Connecticut; triplets; and two sets of twins.
21	Anna and Henry Crocker	1963 (c.)	18 of their children lived to adulthood.
21	Ms and Mr Albert Cunningham	1930	The couple from Iron Mountain, Michigan, had their 21st child in September 1930 after 27 years of marriage. Seventeen of their children were alive.
21	Elizabeth Hudson	1955	Ms Hudson, of London, the wife of a paint sprayer, gave birth to her 21st child in February 1955, at the age of 45. Sixteen of the children were alive.
21	Mary and Wara Tengu	1968	The Maori couple from Hamilton, New Zealand, had their 21st child in January 1968; the mother was then 42 years old. They already had five grandchildren.
21	Ofelia Llanes Gaxiola	1960 (c.)	Ms Ofelia Llanes Gaxiola, of Culiacán, Sinaloa, the wife of a postman, gave birth to 21 children.
21	Aliza and Meir Ben-Haroush	1969	Aliza Ben-Haroush of Haifa gave birth to her 21st child in July 1969 at the age of 46 and became the most prolific mother in Israel.
21	Unidentified Indian woman	1970	Not much is known about this case except that a woman from Assam gave birth to her 21st child in 1970.
21	Leonora and Yanosh Nameni	2013	Leonora Namenia, of Ostritsa, Hertsa Raion, Chernivtsi Oblast, gave birth to her 21st child in October 2013, at the age of 44, becoming the most prolific mother in Ukraine. Leonora and Yanosh are followers of the Apostolic Christian Church (Nazarene) and do not practice birth control. The Nameni family has 11 sons and 10 daughters, including two sets of twins.
21	Sebastiana Maria da Conceicao	2015	Sebastiana Maria da Conceicao, aged 51, gave birth to her 21st child in the city of Aracaju, Brazil, in May 2015. The boy joined the family of 10 brothers and 10 sisters, of whom 18 were alive.
20	Louis and Mary Herbert	1935	17 of the children lived to adulthood. 2 died as infants and another drowned at the age of 3. There were 1 set of twins born in 1931. The first 8 children were born in Bethlehem, Pennsylvania and the last 12 were born in West Monroe, New York. The novel "Family on the Hill" by Ambrose Flack is loosely based on this family, Flack was their neighbor.
20	Jane (née Purdon) and Adam Loftus.	1590 (c.)	The archbishop of Armagh, and later of Dublin, and Lord Chancellor of Ireland, Adam Loftus, had 20 children with his wife Jane between c. 1559 and 1590, twelve of whom survived to adulthood.
20	Catherine Marion de Druy and Antoine Arnauld	1612	Famous French lawyer Antoine Arnauld had 20 children with his wife Catherine Marion de Druy between 1588 and 1612, ten of whom survived to adulthood.
20	Elizabeth Carleton	1681 (c.)	Elizabeth Carleton, daughter of Sir Dudley Carleton, had one child, daughter Elizabeth, with her first husband Thomas Barker, and 19 children with her second husband Giles Vanbrugh, 12 of whom survived infancy, including English architect and dramatist John Vanbrugh (1664–1726) and Commodore Governor of Newfoundland Philip Vanbrugh (c. 1681 – 1753).
20	Marie Elisabeth of Eggenberg and Ferdinand Joseph	1685	Ferdinand Joseph had 20 children with his wife Marie Elisabeth of Eggenberg between 1657 and 1685 (all single births), of whom only five survived to adulthood.
20	Anne Margrethe Rossing and Peder Horrebow	1718 (c.)	Danish astronomer Peder Horrebow and his wife Anne Margrethe Rossing had a total of 20 children. One of their sons, Christian Horrebow, born 1718, continued his father's astronomical studies.
20	Barbe Arnault and Antoine Monneron	1758	Barbe Arnault and Antoine Monneron had 20 children between 1733 and 1758 (all single births), 12 of whom survived infancy. Their sons became well known Monneron brothers.
20	Rosgen (née Fuld) and Hayum Lowenstein	1860 (c.)	Rosgen and Hayum Lowenstein of Langendernbach, Germany, had 20 children, 19 of whom survived to adulthood. The youngest child was born in 1860.
20	Marie Verrault and Pierre Edouard Cauchon	1882	Born between 1853 and 1882 at Château-Richer, Québec, Canada, sixteen of the children died in infancy, and one as a young adult. There were no multiple births.
20	Florestine Piché and Gaspard Beaupré	1881	Florestine Piché and Gaspard Beaupré had 20 children; the eldest of them was famous giant Édouard Beaupré, born in 1881 in Willow Bunch, Saskatchewan.
20	Emma Catherine Padgett and Addison Bidwell Millard	1890	Addison Millard (1843–1898) and Emma Padgett (1849–1919) married in 1865 in Urbana, Maryland, and had 20 children, the last of whom was born in 1890. Six died in infancy. The family moved to Virginia in 1893, where they ran Colvin Run Mill for more than 50 years.
20	Elise Steinmann and Leonhard Hauser	1928 (c.)	The couple had 20 children, seven of whom died as infants. Elise Steinmann (1848–1928) and Leonhard Hauser (1842–1915) were both born in Switzerland. they immigrated to the US in 1882, and settled in Greenwood (now Greenfield) near Rockford, Minnesota. 13 of their children were born in Switzerland, and seven in the US.
20	Ella and James Lee Townsend	1917	Ella and James Lee Townsend, sharecroppers from Montgomery County, Mississippi, had a total of 20 children. The youngest of them was American voting rights activist, civil rights leader, and philanthropist Fannie Lou Hamer, born in 1917.
20	Gertrude Louisa Rowe Goodley and George Thomas Jolley	1932	Gertrude and George married in 1905 and had 20 children between 1906 and 1932, when Gertrude was aged 46. The family were from the Tolaga Bay area on New Zealand's North Island. Issue 227 of the Gisborne Photo News carried a report in 1973 about a reunion of 140 of their descendants and noted that they had 215 direct descendants at that time.
20	Mary and John Fullerton	1935 (c.)	Mary and John Fullerton from County Donegal, Ireland, had 20 children, the eldest of whom was Eddie Fullerton, born in 1935.
20	Ms and Mr Rexford Oakley	1954	Ms Oakley, aged 54, from Scranton, Pennsylvania, gave birth to her 20th child in December 1954. 18 of the children, including the newborn, were alive.
20	Ms and Mr Edward Bitter	1958	Ms Bitter, aged 40, the wife of a bricklayer, from Covington, Kentucky, gave birth to her 20th child in January 1958. Four of their children, including a set of twins, were dead. The other 16 were 10 boys and six girls; the oldest of them was 24.
20	Dolores and Prosper Grenier	1961	Dolores Grenier, aged 43, of Waterville, Maine, gave birth to her 20th child in April 1961. During 26 years of marriage she gave birth to 12 sons and eight daughters, including three sets of twins. Two daughters have died.
20	Eldora and James Parnell	1966	Eldora Parnell, aged 42, of Bakersfield, California, gave birth to her 20th child in November 1966, after 27 years of marriage.
20	The mother of Maria Goncales Moreira	1984	Not much is known about this case except the fact that she had ten sets of twins. Her daughter also had ten sets of twins (see below).
20	Maria Goncales Moreira	1984	Ms Moreira of Rio de Janeiro, Brazil, gave birth to her tenth set of twins (identical boys) on 3 July 1984. Her other twins were 16 girls and two boys. She delivered the first at age 13. Her mother also had ten sets of twins.
20	Jessie Campbell	1990	Ms Campbell (born 1946) of Struan, Isle of Skye, Scotland, gave birth to her 20th child on 22 January 1990.
20	Julianna and Ernő Lukács	1991	Julianna Lukács and her husband, a Hungarian farmer, have six sons and fourteen daughters. They live in Tolna, Hungary, in a mansion farming on 3,336 acres (1,350 ha). The first child was born in 1966 and the last in 1991.
20	Valentina and Anatoliy Khromykh	1993 (c.)	Valentina Khromykh from Lev-Tolstovsky District, Lipetsk Oblast, Russia, gave birth to 20 children, 11 boys and 9 girls. As of May 2015, 15 of the children were alive (two died in infancy and other three at the ages of 12, 28 and 32), the oldest child was 46 and the youngest was 22. Also by May 2015, Valentina was 64, she had been married to Anatoliy Khromykh for 46 years, and they already had ten grandchildren.
20	Elena and Alexander Shishkin	2003	Elena Shishkina (born 1958) of Voronezh Oblast, Russia, gave birth to her 20th child in April 2003, becoming the most prolific mother in Russia; her eldest son was 24 at that time. The Shishkins have 9 sons and 11 daughters, and had 20 grandchildren by November 2012.
20	Marie and Antonín Kludský	1909 (c.)	Marie (1832–1909) and Antonín Kludský (1826–1895) from Bohemia were parents of 20 boys and ancestors of the famous cirque family Kludský.
20	Georgiana Văcaru	2020 (c.)	Georgiana Văcaru (born 1976) from Stoenești, Argeș is the woman with the most children in Romania.
20	Bertta (née Ämmänpää) and Seppo Oikarinen	1992	A couple in Finland had 20 children.
20	Mary Ann Burtle	1781	Mary Ann Burtle, an American woman who lived in Maryland reportedly delivered 20 children across 1795-1825

== Fathers ==
This section lists men who have produced at least 25 or more children, usually with different women. Males who have fathered large numbers of children through medical sperm donation are difficult to record. Numbers in italics are inexact, particularly of rulers of antiquity.

Total births	Father's name	Approximate year of last birth	Notes
868–1171	Moulay Ismail Ibn Sharif	1727 (c.) (Note: His date of death)	The monarch of Morocco who had a harem of 500 women, and fathered 525 boys and 342 girls by 1703 and achieved a 700th son in 1721. In total, Guinness World Records calculated the most children to one father at 1042. A research team at the University of Vienna suggested 1171 children from a report by Dominique Busnot.
900+	Bertold Paul Wiesner		This scientist fathered up to 1000 children by artificial insemination by donor through the medical practice of his second wife Mary Barton, between 1942 (or earlier) and 1967. He also is the father of Eva Ibbotson by his first wife Anna Gmeyner, and two children by Mary Barton.
800+	Simon Watson		British sperm donor, made headlines in 2016 for claiming to have sired over 800 children. He regularly posts updates of his new children to Twitter. In 2018, a child of Watson took a DNA test and matched with 40 siblings. Made headlines again in 2019 for getting 13 women pregnant in just 26 days.
500+	Jonathan Jacob Meijer		Dutch musician who, in his 30s, may have fathered 200 children through sperm donation. The director of the Dutch Donor Child Foundation, told the Times that his offspring could number several hundred or even 1,000. In 2023 a Dutch court forbade Meijer from donating any more sperm with a potential fine of €100,000 per infraction.
360–380	King Augustus II the Strong		King of Poland, lived 1670–1733
up to 300	Paul Elden Kingston		Paul Kingston is the leader of the Latter Day Church of Christ, also known as the Kingston Clan or The Order in Utah.
210	King Sobhuza II		King of Swaziland (now Eswatini), lived 1899–1982, is thought to have had 70 wives.
177	Sultan Ibrahim Njoya		He was King of Bamum in Cameroon, lived 1860–1933, and is thought to have had 'around 600' wives. He was said to have had 149 children by December 1915.
170+	Mohammed Bello Abubakar		Mohammed Bello Abubakar (1924–2017) of Nigeria married 86 women and had 170 children with them before being arrested in 2008 for polygamy for having more than four wives.
≥165	Ari Nagel		The American maths professor has fathered more than 100 children via sperm donation.
160+	Ancentus Ogwella Akukujulama		This Kenyan polygamist, known as "Danger", lived 1916–2010; he married "more than 100 times" and had fathered "at least 160 children". An unsubstantiated article from the East African Standard claimed he had 210 children: 104 daughters and 106 sons, by some 130 wives.
158	Jack Kigongo		Kigongo lived in Kateerea, Uganda, 1909–2012; he had 27 wives, and when he died aged 103, had around 500 grandchildren.
150	Joe Donor		As of July 2018, a 47-year-old man using the pseudonym Joe Donor claimed to have fathered up to 150 children by using a Facebook page to connect with women looking for free sperm, generally by having sex with "Joe" rather than through costly artificial insemination (though some customers do prefer syringes of his sperm). At the time of a 2014 interview on the television news magazine 20/20, Joe had already claimed 30+ successful childbirths from having sex with 100 different women requesting his free-sperm-via-intercourse offer.
150	Anonymous sperm donor		As of September 2011, an American sperm donor was found to have produced at least 150 children. This was the inspiration for the 2011 Canadian film Starbuck and its 2013 American remake Delivery Man.
145+	Winston Blackmore		Leader of the Mormon fundamentalist sect called the Blackmore/Bountiful Community, he fathered children through as many as 25 wives.
144	Miên Định, Prince of Thọ Xuân		Son of Minh Mang, fathered 144 children, including 78 sons and 66 daughters.
142	Emperor Minh Mạng		He is reported to have fathered 142 children from 400 wives.
128	Misheck Doctor Nyandoro		Nyandoro, a Zimbabwean man living in Chipinge, currently has 15 wives and 128 children.
120	Liu Sheng, Prince of Zhongshan		
120	Bodawpaya		King of Burma, fathered 62 sons and 58 daughters
117	John Robert Dunn		John Robert Dunn (1834–1895), a South African hunter and trader, was already married when he became an adviser to the Zulu king Cetshwayo, who granted him land, cattle, a chieftainship and two Zulu brides. He married 46 more Zulu women and fathered 33 sons and 46 daughters.
106–115	Saud of Saudi Arabia		King Saud, son of Ibn Saud of Saudi Arabia, lived 1902–1969. According to one source he had 52 sons and about 54 daughters from 'a wider range of women' than his father (who had 22 wives); however, another source credited him with 115.
114	Matteo Valles		One of America's most well known sperm donors. Although he is retired now, at age 25 he is estimated to have 114 children. This initially came to light due to starring on ABC's The Bachelorette Season 15.
114	Miên Trinh, Prince of Tuy Lý		Another son of Minh Mang, fathered 77 sons and 37 daughters.
114	Ed Houben		Houben was Europe's most prolific sperm donor. He advocates the use of natural methods.
110	Mindon Min		King of Burma, fathered 110 children.
108+	Fath-Ali Shah Qajar		The second Shah of the Qajar dynasty of Iran, Fath-Ali (1772–1834) had 48 daughters and 60 sons 'who survived infancy', as a result of the 160+ marriages by which he had consolidated his control over the country. Many of his descendants went on to become prominent figures.
106+	John Daniel Kingston		A member of a fundamentalist Mormon group, Kingston had 106 children by 14 wives as of 2004.
100+	Murad III		It was said that Murad III fathered over a hundred children.
100+	Pavel Durov		As of 29 June 2024, CEO of Telegram, Pavel Durov, said to have over 100 biological kids via sperm donation in 12 nations since 2010.
102	Lou Salvador		The Filipino basketball player and actor fathered 102 children, including Alona Alegre, Phillip Salvador, and Ross Rival.
101	Bindusara		Emperor Bindusara had 101 sons (one of them was Emperor Ashoka) from his 16 wives
≤100	Augustus John		The Welsh painter is widely reported to have fathered 'up to 100 children', mostly outside marriage, although some believe that this figure is greatly exaggerated.
Most likely less than 100 (Highly contentious) (Note: 1,000–3,000 (wildly overestimated by myths))	Genghis Khan		According to popular myths and legends about his prolific number of offspring, Genghis Khan, the founder and first Khan of the Mongol Empire is rumoured to have fathered 100 or more children from his enormous harem. A 2003 study speculated that 16 million men alive today are likely direct descendants of him and/or his male relatives. However, a later study has cast doubt on this claim. This amount of children that Genghis Khan is referenced as having is likely an exaggeration from later myths and his real number of offspring is likely to be much less.
88–103	Ramesses II		Egyptian pharaoh; see list of children of Ramesses II
64–99	Juan Vicente Gómez		Juan Vicente Gómez was the dictator of Venezuela from 1908 to 1935. He had sixteen children with his two official mistresses, and several others in affairs.
98	Donald L. Cline		An American fertility doctor who illegally used his own sperm to impregnate his customers since the 1970s. DNA has been shown to link 94 siblings so far (in addition to the 4 children he had with his wife).
97	Bayinnaung		The Burmese king had over 50 wives and 97 children. See Family of Bayinnaung.
96	Daad Mohammed Murad Abdul Rahman		Balochi-Emirati who wants to have 100. He has married wives from different countries too.
94	Ziona		Leader of the religious sect Pu Chana páwl, in the Mizoram state of India, has 94 children with 39 wives, as well as 33 grandchildren, and has, according to the Guinness Book of Records, the world's largest family.
87	Feodor Vassilyev		Feodor Vassilyev, a peasant from Shuya, Russia, had 69 children with his first wife and 18 with his second. At least 82 of his children survived infancy.
86	Trần Viết Chu		A peasant from Hải Lăng, Quảng Trị (Vietnam), he had 86 children with 12 wives.
82	Mongkut (Rama IV)		King Mongkut, Thailand's fourth monarch, had 32 wives and concubines during his lifetime who produced at least 82 children, one of whom was Chulalongkorn. See list of children of Mongkut.
82	Jan Karbaat		Dutch fertility doctor who used his own seed to impregnate patients. He has 11 children from his marriage, 22 donor children which were DNA-matched before his death, and an additional 49 children which were DNA-matched via sibling DNA matching after his death.
77	Chulalongkorn (Rama V)		King Chulalongkorn, Thailand's fifth monarch, had 92 consorts during his lifetime who produced 77 children, of whom 33 were sons and 44 were daughters. See list of children of Chulalongkorn
75	Ibn Saud of Saudi Arabia		King Abdulaziz, the first monarch of Saudi Arabia, lived 1876–1953; he had 45 recorded sons and about 30 daughters from 22 wives and concubines. By 2001 he had 2,500–3,500 direct descendants. See descendants of Ibn Saud.
75	Screamin' Jay Hawkins		Hawkins, a rock and roll singer, had 57 confirmed children, possibly as many as 75.
75	Cecil Byran Jacobson		This fertility doctor was suspected of fathering as many as 75 children by impregnating patients with his own sperm. During trial 15 children were confirmed through his DNA.
75	Taeng	1812	Thai royal, King Phuttha Yotfa Chulalok's nephew, had 75 children with numerous wives.
74	Ben Seisler		Seisler, who spent three years donating sperm to a Virginia sperm bank to offset law-school expenses, learned that his donations had produced 74 children.
73	Phuttha Loetla Naphalai (Rama II)		King Phuttha Loetla Naphalai, Thailand's second monarch, had 73 children with 40 women.
72	Emperor Huizong of Song		Emperor Huizong of Song, Emperor of the Song dynasty, fathered 38 sons and 34 daughters from a harem of 148 women.
72	Ramon Revilla Sr.		Ramon Revilla Sr. was a Filipino actor and politician. He was known as the "Hari ng Agimat" (literally "King of Amulets") in Philippine films. With his extramarital affairs, his children numbered at least 39; Bong's spokesperson Portia Ilagan claimed that the number reached 72. In a 2004 interview with journalist Jessica Soho, Revilla admitted that he probably has more than 80 children.
72	Mehtar Aman ul-Mulk		Aman ul-Mulk, ruler of Chitral, now part of Pakistan (1821–1892), is known as the Lot Mitar or Great Mehtar. He had 72 children, as reported in Tribes of the Hindoo Koosh by Biddulph.
70	"Louis", a Dutch sperm donor		A Dutch man born 1949/50 in the Netherlands to a Dutch mother and Surinamese father and raised in Suriname, Louis is a pseudonym. He donated between the 1982 and 2002 at three clinics, far exceeding the current limit of 25 donations. 70 live births are confirmed, of whom he has met 40 since 2011, but he estimates 200 in total; he doubts another estimate as high as 1000.
66	John II, Duke of Cleves		Duke of Cleves and called "the Babymaker" (German: der Kindermacher) for fathering sixty-three illegitimate children before his marriage to Mathilde of Hesse, with whom he had three children.
65	Heber C. Kimball		First counselor to President Brigham Young of the Church of Jesus Christ of Latter-day Saints, he fathered children through 17 of his 43 wives.
65	Rulon Jeffs		President of the Fundamentalist Church of Jesus Christ of Latter-Day Saints, he fathered children, including Warren Jeffs, with as many as 75 wives.
65	Christopher Layton	1896	President of the St. Joseph Stake of the Church of Jesus Christ of Latter-day Saints in Thatcher, Arizona, and colonizer of multiple settlements in Arizona and Utah. He had 65 children with 10 wives.
64	John W Hess		Lived 1824 to 1903 and was the President of the Davis Stake of The Church of Jesus Christ of Latter-day Saints in 1894. Fathered 64 children with 7 wives as noted in his autobiography. His obituary indicated 65 children.
64	Thiệu Trị		Emperor of Vietnam, he fathered children through 24 wives.
61	Norodom of Cambodia		King of Cambodia, he fathered 61 sons and daughters with 47 wives.
61	Kashemsanta Sobhaga		Thai royal, son of Mongkut, fathered 39 sons and 22 daughters.
60	Warren Jeffs		President of the Fundamentalist Church of Jesus Christ of Latter-Day Saints, he fathered children through as many as 70 wives.
59	Emperor Xuanzong of Tang		Emperor Xuanzong of Tang, Emperor of the Tang dynasty, fathered 30 sons and 29 daughters with numerous wives.
58	Thado Minsaw		Prince of Burma, fathered 32 sons and 26 daughters
58	Pinklao		Thai royal, Front Palace
58	Gennadij Raivich		Professor of perinatal neuroscience and private sperm donor, he fathered 58 children.
56	John Doyle Lee		Utah pioneer and early leader of the Church of Jesus Christ of Latter-day Saints, he had 18 wives and 56 children.
56	Brigham Young		Second president of the Church of Jesus Christ of Latter-day Saints, he fathered 56 children through 16 of his 55 wives.
55	Kangxi Emperor		A Chinese emperor of the Qing dynasty who lived 1654–1722, he fathered 35 sons and 20 daughters from numerous wives and concubines.
55	Perrigrine Sessions		A member of the Church of Jesus Christ of Latter-day Saints and a son of Patty Bartlett Sessions, he had 55 children with eight wives.
55	Pan		Thai royal, King Phuttha Yotfa Chulalok's nephew, had 34 sons and 18 daughters with numerous wives.
54+	Mohammed bin Awad bin Laden		This Yemeni emigrant to Saudi Arabia married 22 times and fathered at least 54 children. Osama bin Laden is believed to have been his 17th son.
54	Merril Jessop		Bishop and one-time de facto leader of the Fundamentalist Church of Jesus Christ of Latter-day Saints, he fathered 54 children with his first six wives.
53	Tokugawa Ienari	1822	A Shogun of Tokugawa shogunate who lived 1773–1841, he fathered 26 sons and 27 daughters from 16 wives.
52	Wongsa Dhiraj Snid		Thai royal, son of Rama II of Siam
52	Salem Juma'a		Salem Juma'a from United Arab Emirates fathered 52 children through 12 wives. By November 2009 he was approximately 75 years old and ten of his children were dead. The other 42 were 21 sons and 21 daughters aged from 13 to 38 years old.
52	Shire Sharmarke Adan		Shire Sharmarke of the Eidagale fathered a total of 52 children, 23 sons and 29 daughters
51	Nangklao (Rama III)		King Nangklao, Thailand's third monarch, had 51 children with 37 women.
50	Ebraucus		King of Britain, a legendary man who had 20 sons and 30 daughters by 20 wives, c. 1,000 BC.
50	Luiz Costa Oliveira		A Brazilian from Rio Grande do Norte State, he has 50 children from three women (wife, sister-in-law, mother-in-law).
50	Jean-Bédel Bokassa		Dictator of the Central African Republic, he lived 1921–1996, and had 17 wives.
50	Sheikh Jaber Al-Ahmad Al-Jaber Al-Sabah		Sheikh Jaber Al-Ahmad Al-Sabah, the 13th Ruler of Kuwait and Emir from 1977 to 2006, was the father of 50 children from multiple wives.
49	Goel Ratzon		Ratzon is a Jewish cult leader and Messiah claimant, born in 1951; in 2010 he reportedly had '21 wives', with whom he had fathered 49 children (CNN data), or 'more than 30 wives' and 89 children (Time magazine data). These statistics came to light when he was charged with enslavement and rape.
48	Roy Padilla Sr.		Filipino actor and politician; father of actor-turned-senator Robin, actors Royette, Rommel and BB Gandanghari, and politicians Roy Jr. and Ricarte.
48	Joseph F. Smith		Sixth president of the Church of Jesus Christ of Latter-day Saints (LDS Church), he fathered 48 children with six wives (though his first wife, Levira Smith, never bore children).
48	Devawongse Varoprakar		Thai royal, son of Mongkut, fathered 48 sons and daughters.
48	Svasti Sobhana		Thai royal, son of Mongkut, fathered 48 sons and daughters.
47	John McAfee		In 2018 the software magnate claimed to have 47 'genetic children'
46	Joe Jessop		As of February 2010 Jessop was 88. He lived in Short Creek, Utah, alongside a community of at least 6,000 followers of the Fundamentalist Church of Jesus Christ of Latter-Day Saints. He fathered 46 children with five wives and had 239 grandchildren.
46	Marriner W. Merrill		A Latter-day Saint and the great-grandfather of Todd Christensen, he fathered 46 children with six out of his eight wives.
45	Orson Pratt		Orson Pratt (Sr.), polymath, and an apostle of the Church of Jesus Christ of Latter-day Saints, lived 1811–1881; he fathered 45 children through his ten wives.
30–45	Idi Amin		Dictator of Uganda, he lived 1925–2003, and had 17 wives.
44	Jesse N. Smith		Jesse Nathaniel Smith, a Mormon pioneer, church leader, colonizer, politician, frontiersman, and member of the Church of Jesus Christ of Latter-day Saints, fathered 44 children through his five wives.
44	Ong Seok Kim		Ong Seok Kim, an educationalist, social worker, philanthropist and entrepreneur. He fathered 44 children through his five wives.
43	Abdul Hamid Halim of Kedah		Sultan of Kedah, had 43 children from 7 spouses. Father of the first Prime Minister of Malaysia Tunku Abdul Rahman.
43	Yang Sen		A Chinese general and politician who fathered 43 sons and daughters with at least 12 wives.
43	Maha Sura Singhanat		Thai royal, younger brother of Rama I, fathered 43 sons and daughters.
43	Philip IV of Spain		He fathered 13 legitimate children through his two wives and is said to have at least 30 illegitimate children with different women of all conditions.
43	Mr Pennant	c. 1573	Born William ap Dafydd ap Howel ap Iorwerth, he later adopted the family name Pennant and lived in Anglesey, Wales, dying on the 12th of March 1581. Pennant married three times, with his first wife he had twenty-two children, second wife ten and then with his third wife four kids with more out of wedlock. At the time of Mr. Pennant's death, his eldest son was 84 and had over 300 descendants.
42	Hongwu Emperor		First Emperor of the Ming dynasty. Fathered 26 sons and 16 daughters with numerous wives.
42	Phuttha Yotfa Chulalok (Rama I)		King Phuttha Yotfa Chulalok, Thailand's first monarch, had 42 children from 28 women.
42	Lorenzo Snow		Fifth president of the Church of Jesus Christ of Latter-day Saints, he fathered children through his nine wives.
42	Joseph Kony		Joseph Kony, the Ugandan leader of the Lord's Resistance Army (LRA), has 42 children with 88 spouses.
41	Friedrich von Kahlbutz		A minor Prussian nobleman who lived 1651–1702, he fathered 11 children by his wife, and 30 by peasant women in his domain. His mummy is preserved in a church in Neustadt in Brandenburg.
41	Aston "Family Man" Barrett		Aston Francis Barrett (born 22 November 1946), often called "Family Man" or "Fams" for short, is a Jamaican musician and Rastafarian. His nickname came about before he had any children of his own. Aston foresaw his role as a band leader and started to call himself "Family Man". He has fathered 41 children since.
41	Muhammad Yusaf		Muhammad Yousaf of Sargodha, Pakistan, had at least 41 children from seven wives.
41	Emperor Gaozu of Tang		Emperor Gaozu of Tang, Emperor of the Tang dynasty, fathered 41 children with numerous wives.
40	Maha Senanurak		Thai royal, son of Rama I, fathered 40 sons and daughters.
40	Emperor Daizong of Tang		Emperor of the Tang dynasty, fathered 20 sons and 20 daughters from numerous wives.
40	Hsinbyushin		King of Burma, fathered 20 sons and 20 daughters
39+	Emperor Wu of Jin		Sima Yan, founder of China's Jin dynasty, had 26 sons and at least 13 daughters. Details are here.
38	Emperor Xianzong of Tang		Emperor of the Tang dynasty. Fathered a total of 20 sons and 18 daughters from numerous wives.
38	Qian Liu		Emperor of the Wuyue Kingdom. Fathered at least 38 sons and an uncertain number of daughters.
38	Ramon Revilla		A Filipino actor and former senator, he fathered children through 16 different women. Claims to have fathered up to 72 children.
37	Damrong Rajanubhab	1928	Thai royal, son of Mongkut, fathered 37 sons and daughters.
37+	Peter Ellenstein		Ellenstein is an American actor, stage director and producer, who has fathered a confirmed 37 children through sperm donation.
37	Tokugawa Nariaki	1858	Lord of Mito, had 37 children from 10 spouses.
36	Adisara Udomdej	1914	Thai royal, King Mongkut's son, had 22 sons and 14 daughters with numerous wives.
36	Sultan Husain Bayqara		Ruler of Timurid Herat and Samarqand. Fathered 18 sons and 18 daughters from 12 wives
36	Emperor Shunzong of Tang		Emperor of the Tang dynasty. Fathered 23 sons and 13 daughters from numerous wives.
36	Tharrawaddy Min		King of Burma, fathered 18 sons and 18 daughters
36	Mswati III		The king of Eswatini (formerly Swaziland) has 36 children by 15 wives (as of 2021).
35+	King Abdullah of Saudi Arabia		The former King Abdullah of Saudi Arabia, born in 1924, he fathered at least 35 children, by thirteen wives.
35	Emperor Taizong of Tang		Emperor Taizong of Tang, Second Emperor of the Tang dynasty. Fathered 14 sons and 21 daughters from numerous wives.
35	Narathip Praphanphong		Thai royal, son of Mongkut, fathered 21 sons and 14 daughters
35	Kanaung Mintha		Prince of Burma, fathered 20 sons and 15 daughters
35	Anurak Devesh		Thai royal, Rear Palace
34	John Taylor		Third president of The Church of Jesus Christ of Latter-day Saints, he fathered children through his seven wives.
34	Taejo of Goryeo		Founding as well as first king of Goryeo, he fathered 34 children (25 sons & 9 daughters) through 32 consorts (6 queens & 26 concubines).
33	Dr. Jan Muhammad		Jan Muhammad is from Quetta, Pakistan. He has 14 sons and 19 daughters.
33	Nicholas C. Strohl		Farmer who lived in the Lehigh Valley area of Pennsylvania. Strohl fathered 33 children through three wives.
33+	Sun Hao		As Emperor of Eastern Wu, he promoted his 33 sons as prince.
33	Wilford Woodruff		Fourth president of the Church of Jesus Christ of Latter-day Saints, he fathered children through his five (possibly six) wives.
32	George Lake	1894	Member of the Church of Jesus Christ of Latter-day Saints, he fathered 32 children by 3 wives 1861-1894.
32	Yuan Shikai		An important Chinese general and politician, he fathered 32 children (17 sons and 15 daughters) through his wife and nine concubines.
32	Gia Long		Emperor of Vietnam, he fathered 32 children.
32	Albert Emund Barlow		A follower of the Church of Jesus Christ of Latter-day Saints living in Utah, he was arrested for polygamy at age 52 in 1955. He was said to have fathered 32 children by his three wives.
32	Mr. Catra		Brazilian funk carioca singer, fathered 32 children with 3 wives.
32	Sultan bin Abdulaziz Al Saud		Saudi royal, Crown Prince of Saudi Arabia
31+	Cao Cao		Cao Cao had 25 sons (including Cao Pi, founder of China's Wei dynasty) and at least six daughters. Details are here.
31	Prince Fushimi Kuniie		Japanese royalty, fathered 17 sons and 14 daughters with ten wives.
31	Benjamin Clark		A cousin of the explorer William Clark, he fathered 31 children by his two wives; seven of them died in infancy.
30+	Sheikh Mohammed bin Rashid Al Maktoum		The ruler of United Arab Emirates has over 30 children, from 6 wives. 12 of which are from his first and most senior wife Hind bint Maktoum Al Maktoum.
30+	Jonas Savimbi		An Angolan politician and guerrilla leader, he lived 1934–2002, and had fathered 29–31 children by 1999; his number of wives is not recorded.
30+	Omar Bongo		President of Gabon, he lived 1935–2009; his number of wives is not recorded.
30	Taksin, King of Thonburi		Taksin (1734-1782), the King of the Thonburi Kingdom, had 21 sons and nine daughters.
30	Kashemsri Subhayok		Thai royal, son of Mongkut, fathered 18 sons and 12 daughters
30	Parley Pratt		Early Mormon leader who fathered 30 children with 9 wives. Brother of Orson Pratt (q.v.).
30	Miles Park Romney		A Latter-day Saint and great-grandfather of Mitt Romney, he fathered 30 children with five wives; he married the last in 1890, just before the 1890 Manifesto.
30	Tom Green		A Mormon fundamentalist, he fathered children through ten women.
30	Fally Diallo		Senegalese Imam El Hadji Fally Diallo has, up to 2014, fathered 30 children with three wives. He campaigns against family planning in Senegal, claiming that it is his God-given duty to multiply.
29	Sisowath of Cambodia		Sisowath of Cambodia, King of Cambodia, fathered 29 sons and daughters.
29	Henry I of England		Henry I of England, King of England, had 16 daughters and 11 sons, but only 3 of the children were legitimate
28	Emperor Zhaozong of Tang		Emperor Zhaozong of Tang, penultimate Emperor of the Tang dynasty fathered 17 sons and 11 daughters from numerous wives. He was the father of Emperor Ai of Tang.
28	Wichaichan		Thai royal, Front Palace
28	Goodwill Zwelithini kaBhekuzulu		The king of the Zulu nation, who reigned from 1968 until his death in 2021, had six wives and 28 children.
28	François Maxim Gamache		Gamache was a farmer originally from L'Acadie, Québec, Canada, between his two wives he fathered 15 daughters and 13 sons between 1838 and 1880. With his first wife Osithe Martin he had 10 children. After her death he married Marguerite Duteau and they had 18 children together. There were no multiple births. He died on 19 May 1882 in Cohoes, New York, at the age of 67.
28	Cheong Eak Chong		Chinese businessman who lived in Singapore, fathered 28 children (16 sons and 12 daughters) with 3 wives.
27	Qianlong Emperor		The Qianlong Emperor, Emperor of the Qing dynasty, fathered 17 sons and 10 daughters from 38 wives.
26	Gregorio Dati		Florentine merchant who had 4 wives, all of whom died in childbirth: Only 7 of his children survived into adulthood, and a few died of the Bubonic plague.
26	Roch Thériault		The leader of the Ant Hill Kids cult, he fathered children through eight women.
26	Tairrdelbach Ua Conchobair		King of Connacht and High King of Ireland who had 26 children by 6 known wives.
25	Edward Hess		Hess was an innkeeper from Safe Harbor, Pennsylvania, who also owned a shad fishery. One of the richest men in the area, he had four children with his first wife Elizabeth Ann Shenk, 17 with his second wife Mary Ann Lewis, and four with his third wife Catherine Rankin, who was 37 years his junior.
25	Tobe Liston		Arkansas sharecropper; had 15 children from his first marriage and 10 from his second marriage. His 24th child was boxer Sonny Liston.
25	Louis XV of France		King of France from 1 September 1715 to 10 May 1774. Had 10 legitimate children with his wife Marie Leszczyńska, with the rest from several mistresses. He reputedly had more, but the difficulty in fully documenting all such births restricts the number only to the better-known.
24-25	Buenaventura Ortiz de Ayala (es)	1848	Mexican landowner, politician from the state of Michoacán and grandfather of president Pascual Ortiz Rubio. He had 12-13 children with his first wife Maria Dolores from 1810 to 1825, and 12 with his second wife Maria Josefa from 1827 to 1848.

== See also ==
- List of multiple births
- Baby boom
- Biological exponential growth
- Compound annual growth rate
- Population momentum
- Demographic transition
- Density dependence
- Doubling time
- Exponential growth
- Fertility fraud
- Great Stork Derby
- List of countries by population growth rate
- List of countries by total fertility rate
- List of population concern organizations
- Logistic function – concept related to logistic model
- Natalism and Antinatalism
- Population bottleneck
