= McCaughey septuplets =

First set of surviving septuplets in recorded history

- Born: November 19, 1997 (age 28); Des Moines, Iowa, U.S.
- Known for: First known set of surviving septuplets
- Parents: Kenny McCaughey (father); Bobbi McCaughey (mother)

The McCaughey septuplets (/mæˈkɔɪiː/; born November 19, 1997) are septuplets born to Bobbi and Kenny McCaughey in Des Moines, Iowa. They are the world's first known set of surviving septuplets.

== Background, conception and birth ==
Kenny McCaughey (b. 1969) and Bobbi McCaughey (b. 1968), were residents of the town of Carlisle, Iowa. The McCaugheys have one older daughter, Mikayla Marie, born January 3, 1996. While under treatment with ovulation-stimulating Metrodin for infertility, Bobbi became pregnant with seven babies. The McCaugheys declined selective reduction to reduce the number of infants, saying that they would "put it in God's hands". The obstetricians primarily responsible for the medical care of Bobbi and the babies were Karen Drake and Paula Mahone.

The septuplets, four boys and three girls, were born prematurely at the Iowa Methodist Medical Center in Des Moines on November 19, 1997. They were delivered by a scheduled Caesarean section, attended by a team of 40 specialists, all within six minutes.

The babies' names, birth weight, time of birth, and order of birth are as follows:

Baby order	Time of birth	Birth weight	Name
1	12:48 p.m.	3 lb 4 oz (1.5 kg)	Kenneth (Kenny) or (Ken) Robert
2	12:49 p.m.	2 lb 11 oz (1.2 kg)	Alexis May
3	12:50 p.m.	2 lb 10 oz (1.2 kg)	Natalie Sue
4	12:51 p.m.	2 lb 5 oz (1.0 kg)	Kelsey Ann
5	12:52 p.m.	3 lb 3 oz (1.4 kg)	Nathan Roy
6	12:53 p.m.	2 lb 14 oz (1.3 kg)	Brandon James
7	12:54 p.m.	2 lb 15 oz (1.3 kg)	Joel Steven

Two of the septuplets, Alexis and Nathan, have cerebral palsy. Both use walkers to get around, and in November 2005, Nathan had spinal surgery in order to improve his walking abilities.

== Media and public response ==
The birth attracted significant media attention, both positive and negative, including a feature in Time magazine in December 1997. "In the beginning, for every ten letters we would get that were happy for us, we'd get one letter accusing us of exploiting the kids and being selfish to waste the world's resources on a family this big," said Bobbi in a 2007 interview. "Our neighbors never gawked. Here in Carlisle they gave us privacy. But we had complete strangers come around to the back door, knock, and ask if they could hold a baby."

The McCaugheys were the recipients of many donations, including a 5,500 ft^{2} (511 m^{2}) house, a van, nanny services, clothes, and diapers for the first two years. The State of Iowa offered full college scholarships to any state university in Iowa upon the children's graduation from high school. Hannibal–LaGrange University, in Hannibal, Missouri, also offered full scholarships to the children when they were born. President Bill Clinton personally telephoned the McCaugheys to congratulate them. The surviving Dionne quintuplets (Yvonne Dionne, Annette Allard, and Cécile Langlois) wrote an open letter warning the parents to keep the septuplets out of the public eye and not allow them to fall into the same pitfalls as their parents did, but they congratulated Bobbi and Kenny and wished them the best of luck in raising the children. The letter reads as follows:

Dear Bobbi and Kenny,

If we emerge momentarily from the privacy we have sought all our adult lives, it is only to send a message to the McCaughey family. We three would like you to know we feel a natural affinity and tenderness for your children. We hope your children receive more respect than we did. Their fate should be no different from that of other children. Multiple births should not be confused with entertainment, nor should they be an opportunity to sell products.

Our lives have been ruined by the exploitation we suffered at the hands of the government of Ontario, our place of birth. We were displayed as a curiosity three times a day for millions of tourists. To this day we receive letters from all over the world. To all those who have expressed their support in light of the abuse we have endured, we say thank you. And to those who would seek to exploit the growing fame of these children, we say beware.

We sincerely hope a lesson will be learned from examining how our lives were forever altered by our childhood experience. If this letter changes the course of events for these newborns, then perhaps our lives will have served a higher purpose.

Sincerely, Annette, Cécile and Yvonne Dionne.

By the septuplets' tenth birthday in 2007, the family was declining most requests for interviews, other than annual stories with the Des Moines CBS television affiliate KCCI and Ladies' Home Journal. Bobbi McCaughey has noted that the level of media attention does not necessarily mean they have granted many interviews, saying, "There was all kinds of stuff in the papers early on but they never actually interviewed us. Most of it is one paper quoting another".

Bobbi and Kenny both occasionally speak at anti-abortion events and continue to oppose selective reduction. Bobbi has been quoted as saying, "Well, come to our house, and tell me which four I shouldn't have had!" The family continues to attend a Baptist church in West Des Moines, Iowa, where Kenny serves as a deacon. In 2010, for the septuplets' 13th birthday, a documentary was made by TLC chronicling the event.

== Later lives ==
The septuplets graduated from Carlisle High School in May 2016. Natalie, Kelsey, Nathan and Joel took up scholarships offered by Hannibal–LaGrange University. Kenny and Alexis chose to stay in the Des Moines area and attend Des Moines Area Community College, and Brandon enlisted in the United States Army.

In 2017, the septuplets became aunts and uncles when their sister Mikayla gave birth to a son after getting married in 2015. In May 2019, Natalie was the first of the septuplets to get married. Brandon also got married in August 2019. By the end of 2022, when the septuplets turned 25, Brandon and Kenny had become fathers.

== See also ==
- List of multiple births
- Suleman octuplets, the first known octuplets to survive infancy
- Halima Cissé, mother of the first known nonuplets to survive infancy
