= Audrey Clare Farley =

American writer

- Occupation: Author
- Writing career
- Language: English
- Website: audreyclarefarley.com

Audrey Clare Farley is an American writer who has authored two books and is a contributor for The New Republic. Farley received her PhD in English literature from University of Maryland, College Park, and is an adjunct professor at Mount St. Mary's University. Her two books are The Unfit Heiress and Girls and Their Monsters.

== Awards ==
- New York Times Editors' Pick (2023, won — Girls and Their Monsters)
- Michigan Notable Book Award (2024, won — Girls and Their Monsters)

== Bibliography ==
- The Unfit Heiress: The Tragic Life and Scandalous Sterilization of Ann Cooper Hewitt (2021, Grand Central Publishing)
- Girls and Their Monsters: The Genain Quadruplets and the Making of Madness in America (2023, Grand Central Publishing)
