= Suleman octuplets =

American octuplets conceived via in vitro fertilization

- Born: Noah Angel Solomon; Maliyah Angel Solomon; Isaiah Angel Solomon; Nariyah Angel Solomon; Jonah Angel Solomon; Makai Angel Solomon; Josiah Angel Solomon; Jeremiah Angel Solomon; January 26, 2009 (age 17); Bellflower, California, U.S.
- Known for: First known surviving set of octuplets

The Suleman octuplets are six males and two females, conceived via in vitro fertilization (IVF) and subsequently born to Nadya Suleman on January 26, 2009, in Bellflower, California. Residing in Lancaster, California, they are the first known octuplets to survive their infancy. The extremely controversial circumstances of their high-order multiple birth have led to debates in the field of assisted reproductive technology and an investigation by the Medical Board of California of the fertility specialist involved in the case.

== Background ==
=== Conception ===
Suleman's octuplets were conceived by in vitro fertilization (IVF) conducted by Dr. Michael Kamrava. Suleman claimed to have requested the transfer of six embryos that she had accumulated from previous IVF treatments, despite being informed that the recommended guideline limit for a woman her age was three. She stated she wanted all six transferred, as they were all that remained from previous harvest cycles, and she neither wanted to destroy them nor to continue paying for their frozen storage. A subsequent Medical Board of California investigation revealed that 29 embryos remained in frozen storage; nevertheless, Suleman underwent a fresh embryo transfer cycle, and Dr. Kamrava transferred 12 fresh blastocysts into Suleman at her request. The mother's health and gestational status were followed from her first trimester.

=== Birth ===
The delivery (via a scheduled Caesarean section) involved 46 medical personnel and was practiced twice beforehand at the Kaiser Permanente Bellflower Medical Offices in Bellflower, California. Suleman carried the babies to 31 weeks. Doctors anticipated seven babies, so the eighth came as a surprise. Born over the course of five minutes, all eight babies were immediately reported in stable condition; though two required intubation and a ventilator, and another required extra oxygen.

=== Names ===
The babies' names are Noah, Maliyah, Isaiah, Nariyah, Jonah, Makai, Josiah, and Jeremiah. Suleman stated that she chose biblical names and gave all eight the middle name Angel, and that their surname would be Solomon, after their biological father.

The following data from Kaiser Permanente indicate their birth order, birth time, weight, and given name at the time of discharge:

Baby order	Time of birth	Birth weight	Name
A	10:43 am	2 lb 11 oz (1.2 kg)	Noah
B	10:44 am	2 lb 12 oz (1.2 kg)	Maliyah
C	10:45 am	3 lb 4 oz (1.5 kg)	Isaiah
D	10:45 am	2 lb 8 oz (1.1 kg)	Nariyah
E	10:46 am	1 lb 8 oz (0.68 kg)	Jonah
F	10:47 am	2 lb 12 oz (1.2 kg)	Makai
G	10:47 am	1 lb 15 oz (0.88 kg)	Josiah
H	10:48 am	2 lb 11 oz (1.2 kg)	Jeremiah

Baby C (Isaiah) was the largest of the children at 3 lbs, 4 oz, and Baby E (Jonah) was the smallest. Baby H (Jeremiah) had not previously been visible on the ultrasound.

=== Post-delivery ===
Two days after birth, five of the eight infants received their first tube-feeding of donated breast milk. Josiah rejected his first tube-feeding and was returned to intravenous feeding, as his stomach was unable to absorb breast milk. At that time, three of the other infants had been fed intravenously since birth and had yet to receive their first tube-feeding.

Six days after birth, all eight babies were breathing without assistance and were being fed donated breast milk, as well as intravenous nutritional supplements. A hospital spokesman said the octuplets were expected to remain in the hospital for several more weeks.

One week after birth, the Suleman octuplets became the longest-living octuplets in United States history, as the smallest of the Chukwu octuplets born in Houston in 1998 died seven days after birth. Suleman set the Guinness World Record for the most children delivered at a single birth to survive. She held the record until Halima Cissé gave birth to nonuplets in 2021.

Ten days after the birth of her octuplets, Suleman was released from the hospital. In her February 5, 2009, interview, Suleman stated that she held each of the octuplets for 45 minutes a day, holding the smallest, Jonah (born at 1 lb, 8 oz), the longest.

The hospital where the octuplets were expected to spend seven to twelve weeks, requested significant reimbursement from Medi-Cal, the state's Medicaid program, for care of the eight premature babies.

== Family ==
=== Paternity claims ===
Suleman's mother stated that a single sperm donor named David Solomon was used to produce the octuplets as well as her previous six children. Suleman stated that she dated David once, but then realized that she only wanted him to father her children and not to pursue any relationship with him. The octuplets' grandfather and others have accused Suleman of making up a fictitious David Solomon, as she had used the name for the father on birth certificates of her other children, but with a different birthdate.

On the February 23, 2009, edition of ABC's Good Morning America, a man named Denis Beaudoin claimed to be the biological father of Suleman's children. He said they had dated from 1997 to 1999 and that Suleman asked him if he would donate the sperm. Beaudoin requested a paternity test to verify his claim. Suleman denied that he was the donor.

Suleman's ex-husband, Marcos Gutierrez, who divorced Suleman in 2006, denied being the biological father.

=== Grandparents ===
In 2009, the octuplets' maternal grandfather, 67-year-old Edward Doud Suleman, identifying himself as a former Iraqi military man, said he would be returning to his native Iraq as a translator and driver, in order to financially support his daughter and her 14 children. Their grandmother, 69-year-old Angela Victoria Suleman, a retired teacher, has helped look after the first six children. She indicated that she was overwhelmed looking after them, and was critical of her daughter in her public statements in 2009. For example, she said that her daughter did not contribute toward housing or food costs.

== Reception ==
News of the octuplets caused an international media sensation. Suleman had even gone into hiding.

There has been much public discussion about Nadya Suleman's decision to transfer, carry, and give birth to octuplets. Many expressed concern that her decision for more children, despite being unemployed and unmarried, would burden taxpayers via public support.

State Senator Gloria Negrete McLeod introduced legislation to have fertility clinics placed under the jurisdiction of the Medical Board of California. The transfer of twelve embryos in a woman under 35 years of age who already had children raised many controversies and led to calls for legislation to limit the number of simultaneous embryo transfers.

=== Dr. Kamrava investigation ===
The Medical Board of California announced on February 6, 2009, that it was investigating Dr. Kamrava, the physician who transferred the embryos, in an attempt to substantiate if there was a violation of the standard of care. The American Society for Reproductive Medicine expressed interest in assisting the Board in its investigation. Kamrava had also provided fertility treatment to a 49-year-old woman who was uninsured, 5 months pregnant with quadruplets, and hospitalized at Los Angeles County-USC Medical Center, where at least seven embryos were used. In October 2009, the American Society for Reproductive Medicine announced that it had expelled Dr. Kamrava.

In January 2010, charges were filed with the California Medical Board in relation to the conception of the octuplets. The complaint also stated that Kamrava had exercised gross negligence, acted "beyond the reasonable judgment" of any physician, and used a number of embryos that "far exceeded" existing guidelines.

On June 1, 2011, the California Board announced that Dr. Kamrava's license would be revoked effective July 1. The charges also included the assertion that fresh, non-frozen embryos were used each time.

On May 8, 2013, the State Medical Board of Ohio denied Kamrava restoration of his medical license after he filed an appeal to practice there as it was the state where he was educated.

According to The New York Times, Kamrava hid his assets in the Cook Islands, making use of its asset-protection trust laws.

In July 2016, Kamrava filed an appeal with the California Medical Board to reinstate his license to practice in California. The Board rejected the appeal in September 2016.

== Later years ==
A 2018 New York Times article stated that the octuplets at age nine were "small for their age, but they're polite, they cook, they're vegan, they read two books a month and do their homework without being prompted. In spite of all of the horror stories in the tabloids since birth, they're model fourth graders." With 14 siblings in all, the children ate in shifts and some slept on the couch.

In March 2019, the Australian current affairs program Sunday Night interviewed Suleman for the octuplets' tenth birthday; it was noted that the Suleman household is run with "military precision", and the children are "happy, healthy, and well-mannered".

== See also ==
- Halima Cissé, mother of the first set of nonuplets to survive infancy (born in 2021)
- McCaughey septuplets, the first set of septuplets to survive infancy
- Walton sextuplets, the only female sextuplets ever recorded
- List of multiple births
- Natalism
- Quiverfull
