= Giannini sextuplets =

Italian sextuplets (born 1980)

- Born: 11 January 1980 (age 46); Florence, Italy
- Other name: Sei gemelli Giannini (Italian)

The Giannini sextuplets (born 11 January 1980) are a set of sextuplets born to Rosanna Caviglia Giannini and Franco Giannini at the hospital in Villa Medici at Careggi, Florence, Italy. They were the second set of sextuplets in the world to survive past infancy, and the first surviving sextuplets to be born in Europe.

The Giannini sextuplets were born six years to the date after the Rosenkowitz sextuplets, the first surviving sextuplets on record. The sextuplets are made up of four boys and two girls. They are, in birth order;

Baby Order	Time of Birth	Sex	Birth Weight	Name
A		Girl		Letizia
B		Girl		Linda
C		Boy		Fabrizio
D		Boy		Francesco
E		Boy		Giorgio
F		Boy		Roberto

== Backstory ==
Rosanna Caviglia was born and raised in the Casentino Valley and made a living as an elementary school teacher in the provincial town of Arezzo. She married Franco Giannini in 1976.

The children were conceived after a series of hormone treatments brought on by Rosanna Giannini's worry that she was starting an unnaturally early menopause at the age of 29. When she went to her gynecologist for her first ultrasound, she was told not to publicly release the news for fear that it would cause an international media circus.

== Birth and subsequent media attention ==
The six babies were born on 11 January 1980 at Careggi University Hospital in Florence. Once the news broke about the birth, it brought them instant fame in their native Italy, where they were compared to the Bradford family from the popular American dramedy Eight is Enough, as well as internationally, with many news agencies competing for interviews. In the Italian newspapers, stories on the new brood pushed gossip about Princess Caroline off the front pages, and they were invited to Tokyo to take part in a Japanese television special. Their story was also covered in the 1984 book Vivere con sei gemelli (Living with sextuplets), as told to journalist Achille Mezzadri, famous for his work for Gente magazine.

In 1986, Rosanna Giannini signed an exclusive contract with a laundry detergent company in Italy, putting her and her children on television in advertisements for the brand. Of raising the children, Rosanna Giannini said, "There was always someone around; friends and relatives would come in to give us a hand." As far as assistance or charity were concerned, the Tuscan regional government helped the family with a stipend, but apart from that and the revenue received for a few years from the laundry detergent advertisements, the family supported themselves. The task was not easy; Rosanna Giannini estimated that she washed five loads of laundry every day, and that train travel for the entire family cost 250,000 lira a month (€195 in 2009).

== Later lives ==
As the years went on, family problems (such as the death of Rosanna's father and a transplant to replace Francesco's defective kidney) caused the family to make their lives more private. Rosanna Giannini noted that a priest friend of hers warned her that the publicity would "cause a harmful imbalance" in their lives, but she said, "Nothing happened that was harmful... then the interest ended. Fortunately."

Now living private lives, none of the sextuplets have any interest in contributing to interviews for television. In regard to their ambitions, Rosanna Giannini said, "They are following other dreams, but if they wish to do [television] I'm not going to forbid it. I'll only tell them to stay with their feet always on the ground." Follow-up stories about the family have been published by the newspaper Corriere della Sera in 2000 in time for their 20th birthday celebration, and in 2004 by the magazine TV Sorrisi e Canzoni.

As of 2004, four of the six sextuplets were studying at university: Linda and Letizia were studying literature, Fabrizio was studying hydroelectricity, and Giorgio was studying economics. Roberto and Francesco were working at a textile company, one as a loom operator and the other as a clerk.
