= David Rosenthal (psychiatrist) =

American psychologist (1916–1996)

David Rosenthal (c. 1916 – 1996) was an American psychologist known for his research on the relative genetic and environmental contributions to schizophrenia and other psychopathologies. He is particularly recognized for his research on the Genain quadruplets, and he led the team who studied the quadruplets intensively from 1955 to 1958. In 1976, then-NIMH director Bertram S. Brown described Rosenthal as "one of the top scientists in the area of the nature and etiology of schizophrenia." In the 1960s, he collaborated with Seymour Kety and other researchers on multiple adoption studies of schizophrenia that were conducted in Denmark.

== Biography ==
Rosenthal was born in Harlem and grew up in Brooklyn, New York City. He earned his B.A. degree from the University of Akron before working in the United States Army as a medic on a psychiatric ward during World War II. He received his M.S. degree after the war from George Washington University before earning his Ph.D. from the University of Chicago; both of his advanced degrees were in psychology. He then served as a psychologist at the Henry Phipps Psychiatric Clinic at Johns Hopkins University for four and a half years. He spent much of his career at the National Institute of Mental Health (NIMH), where he began working in 1955 and where he remained until his retirement in 1981. In 1977, he took over as head of the NIMH's Laboratory of Psychology, which he renamed the Laboratory of Psychology and Psychopathology. He died in 1996 at a nursing home in Rising Sun, Maryland, following Alzheimer's disease.
