= Girls and Their Monsters =

2023 book by Audrey Clare Farley

- Author: Audrey Clare Farley
- Language: English
- Publisher: Grand Central Publishing
- Publication date: June 13, 2023
- Publication place: United States
- ISBN: 978-1-5387-2447-7

Girls and Their Monsters: The Genain Quadruplets and the Making of Madness in America is a 2023 non-fiction book written by Audrey Clare Farley.

== Synopsis ==
A summary of the lives of the Morlok quadruplets (better known as the Genain quadruplets), four identical girls born in 1930. The book details the girls' history from birth, including chapters about their parents, various psychiatrists that had large impacts on them, and similar families. In Girls and Their Monsters, the dark secrets hidden behind the closed doors of the Morlok house are revealed; the physical, emotional, and sexual abuse that occurred, and the way their innocence was so vehemently upheld, but violated in so many ways. It describes their spiral down into their own mental illness and how this greatly impacted their public image, and the study that followed. Girls and Their Monsters also contains not only a detailed history of psychiatry, and how the study of the quadruplets pushed research on schizophrenia forward, but how the bias of mental illness in relation to people of color progressed throughout time.

== Critical reception ==
The Los Angeles Review of Books called Girls and Their Monsters a "fascinating story".

Rebecca Onion wrote in The Washington Post that "[t]he historical sections are well done, but the book too often reads like an argument about the social origins of mental illness rather than a narrative about a family tragedy", and that the book is "not entirely satisfying".
