= Alice Nabatanzi =

Ugandan, researcher and academic

- Born: 1988 (age 37–38); Kampala, Uganda
- Citizenship: Uganda
- Education: Makerere University (BSc in Ethnobotany) (Master of Science in Natural Products Technology and Value Chains) (PhD in Phytochemistry and Nutraceuticals; University of Pretoria (Carnegie Early Career Research Leader Fellowship)
- Occupations: Researcher and academic
- Years active: 2014–present
- Title: Lecturer in phytomedicine at Makerere University

Alice Norah Nabatanzi (born in 1988) is a Ugandan researcher and academic scientist at Makerere University, Uganda's oldest and largest public university, where she earned a doctorate degree at age 28.

She is the founder of Natural Products Industry Advancement Network Africa (NAPIANA). In February 2023, she won the Best Innovator Award at the Appropriate Technologies Expo, in recognition of the sustainable water purification system that was invented by the university team that she leads.

In 2022, Nabatanzi was awarded US$50,000 (approx. UGX:200 million at that time), by the Organization for Women in Science for the Developing World (OWSD), based in Trieste, Italy. The award is intended to "support Dr Nabatanzi to maintain scientific research at high international standards and attract scholars from all over the world to collaborate".

== Early life and education ==
Nabatanzi is a Ugandan national, born in 1988. She is the second-born to the late Fred Ssempala, an independent auditor, and Annet Florence Ssempala, a businesswoman. Nabatanzi has one sister and three brothers.

She attended Gayaza High School for her O-Level education before transferring to Ndejje Senior Secondary School, where she completed her A-Level studies. She graduated from Makerere University, with a Bachelor of Science degree in Ethnobotany. She went on to obtain a Master of Science degree in Natural Products Technology and Value Chains and a Doctor of Philosophy degree in Phytochemistry and Nutraceuticals, all at Makerere University.

In 2018, she was awarded a three-year post-doctoral fellowship by the University of Pretoria in South Africa, with research time split between Makerere University and the University of Pretoria. The fellowship was also funded by the Carnegie Corporation of New York, under the Regional Initiative in Science and Education (RISE), active from 2008 until 2017, in the African Natural Products Network Section (Rise-Afnet).

== Career ==
During the vacation between high school and entrance into the university (Senior 6 vacation), she was employed at Makerere University College of Engineering, Design, Art and Technology, in their Makapads Project.

As of April 2024, she works as a lecturer in the Department of Plant Sciences, Microbiology and Biotechnology at the College of Natural Sciences (CoNAS), at Makerere University. She has recently concluded a post-doctoral Early Career Research Leader Fellowship at the University of Pretoria in South Africa with a split-site at Makerere University.

== See also ==
- Sarah Ssali
- John Massa Kasenene
