= Mariam Nabatanzi =

Ugandan woman known for fertility (born 1980)

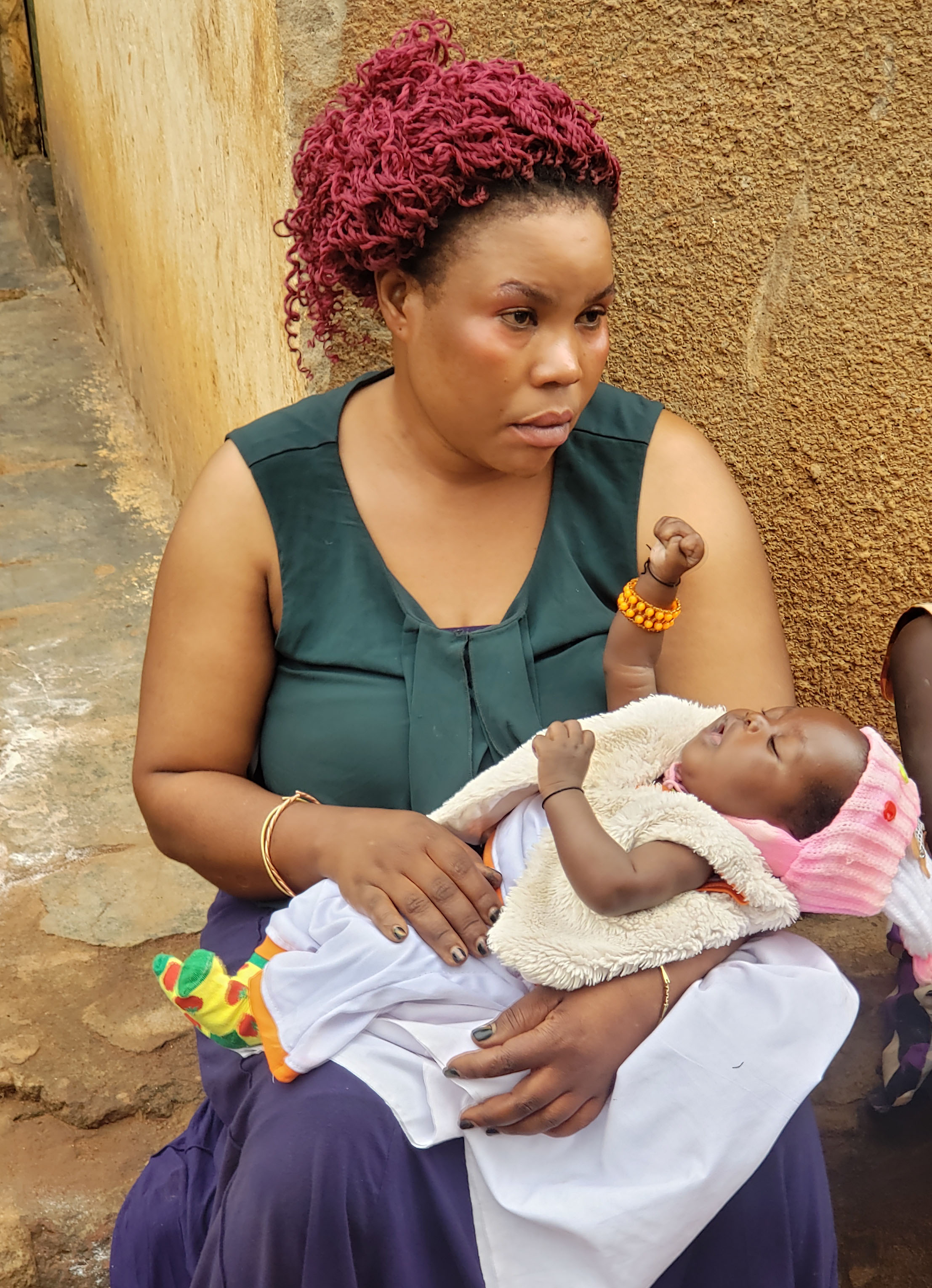
- Nabatanzi with grandchild in 2023
- Born: Mariam Nabatanzi Babirye c. 1980 (age 45–46); Uganda
- Occupations: Tailor; hairdresser
- Known for: Most fertile woman in the world
- Children: 44 (Note: Six children are deceased.)

Mariam Nabatanzi Babirye (born c. 1980), also known as Maama Uganda or Mother Uganda, is a Ugandan woman known for birthing 44 children, 38 of whom are still alive. As of March 2025, her eldest children were 33 years old, and the youngest were eight years old. In 2015, her husband abandoned the family, reportedly unable to support so many children.

Born around 1980, Babirye first gave birth when she was 13 years old, having been forced into marriage the year before. By the age of 36, she had given birth to a total of 44 children, including three sets of quadruplets, four sets of triplets, and six sets of twins, for a total of fifteen births. The number of multiple births was caused by a rare genetic condition causing hyperovulation as a result of enlarged ovaries. In 2019, when Babirye was aged 40, she underwent a medical procedure to prevent any further pregnancies.

== Life and background ==
According to Babirye, her mother abandoned her family and five brothers three days following her birth. When Babirye was seven years old and was away visiting a relative, her stepmother mixed cut glass into the food of her older siblings as a result of which all of them died.

In 1993, a twelve year old Babirye was married off to a physically abusive 40 year old man, who was polygamous and already had multiple other wives. Her father-in-law gave her family a piece of land to support themselves, and at the age of 13, she gave birth to twins, before giving birth to triplets two years later, and then a set of quadruplets a year and a half later. She did not find this unusual, as multiple births were quite common in her family, saying:

My father gave birth to forty-five children with different women, and these all came in quintuplets, quadruples, twins and triplets.

— Mariam Nabatanzi

After her sixth delivery, she approached a doctor about having no more children and was told that "attempting to stop her from having another child would lead to her early death." At age 23, she had given birth to 25 children but was advised to continue having children because "(her) ovary count was still high."

In 2015, Babirye's husband abandoned the family, unable to provide for 42 children, but not before leaving her pregnant with twins; he later on sold off the homestead where Babirye and her children were living. She and her children were hosted by her grandmother, but when her grandmother died, her relatives allowed her to remain in the homestead to house her children. As of April 2023, she still owes a balance on that homestead before she can assume full ownership.

According to Charles Kiggundu, a gynecologist at the Mulago National Specialised Hospital, after giving birth to her last set of twins via cesarian section, Babirye underwent tubal ligation, preventing any further pregnancies. One of the boys from that set of twins died in childbirth, being her most recent child to die.

== Living situation ==
Babirye and her household, comprising sixty-odd individuals, including her children, grandchildren and daughters-in-law, live in the village of Kasawo, located in the Mukono district of Central Uganda. They are largely dependent on donors who donate food, beds and other necessities, but Babirye also works as a part-time tailor, herbalist and hairdresser.

Babirye's household lives in a complex composed of five cement-block houses with corrugated iron roofs; the complex has seventeen rooms, fifteen of which are bedrooms and two are empty living and dining rooms. Nine of the bedrooms are without any beds, and the other six bedrooms have a total of eight bunk beds, four of which are not in usable condition. The other four beds accommodate a total of twenty-four children on mattresses.

== Plans ==
According to The Uganda Times, Babirye hopes to get UGX 5 million (about US$1,400) to pay off the remaining balance on her family's living complex to her grandmother's relatives to take full ownership.

She also hopes to acquire new iron sheets to replace the leaking roofs, twenty-five new bunk beds, and sixty-six new mattresses, so that each person has their own bed. Additionally, she plans to acquire some land for cultivating food and rearing animals with her family workforce, and to achieve financial security for her dependents, as well as starting a restaurant, a bridal salon, and an events management service to employ her children.
