= Genain quadruplets =

American identical quadruplet sisters and psychiatric research subjects

The Morlok quadruplets, known in psychiatric literature as the Genain quadruplets, were American monozygotic (identical) quadruplet sisters born on May 19, 1930, in Lansing, Michigan. They were Edna A. Morlok, Wilma B. Morlok, Sarah C. Morlok (later Sarah Morlok Cotton), and Helen D. Morlok.

Their birth attracted national attention, and as children they appeared together in singing-and-dancing performances. After all four were diagnosed with schizophrenia by the age of 24, they became the subjects of long-running research at the National Institute of Mental Health (NIMH) into hereditary and environmental factors associated with the disorder.

== Early life and public attention ==
The sisters were born at Edward W. Sparrow Hospital in Lansing. Their given-name initials—E, W, S, and H—corresponded to the hospital's name, while their middle initials, A through D, indicated their birth order.

Their birth received extensive press attention. During their childhood, the sisters were given singing and dancing lessons and appeared together in touring stage performances.

Later accounts contrasted their cheerful public image with conditions inside the family home. Audrey Clare Farley's history of the family described an abusive and highly controlling home environment.

== Psychiatric study ==
All four sisters were diagnosed with schizophrenia in early adulthood. A 2000 follow-up study described the combination of monozygotic female quadruplets all developing schizophrenia as exceptionally rare, estimating its occurrence at approximately one in 1.5 billion.

Beginning in the 1950s, the sisters were studied at the National Institute of Mental Health as part of an investigation into hereditary and environmental factors associated with the disorder. Psychologist David Rosenthal led the research team that studied them intensively from 1955 to 1958.

To protect the family's identity, researchers used the Greek-derived pseudonym Genain, described by Rosenthal as meaning "dreadful birth" or "dire gene", and referred to the sisters as Nora, Iris, Myra, and Hester. The initials of those names spell NIMH, the acronym for the National Institute of Mental Health.

The initial study was documented in the 1963 book The Genain Quadruplets: A Case Study and Theoretical Analysis of Heredity and Environment in Schizophrenia, edited by Rosenthal. Follow-up studies continued for several decades and documented differences in the sisters' symptoms, treatment histories, and levels of functioning.

== Later lives and deaths ==
The sisters differed substantially in their degree of independence and their need for psychiatric care. Sarah lived more independently than her sisters for much of her adult life. She married, worked as a secretary, and raised a family.

In 2015, Sarah published a memoir, The Morlok Quadruplets: The Alphabet Sisters.

Wilma died in 2002, Helen in 2003, and Edna in 2015. Sarah, the last surviving sister, died on July 7, 2025, at the age of 95.

== Later accounts ==
Farley's book Girls and Their Monsters: The Genain Quadruplets and the Making of Madness in America was published in 2023. It re-examined the sisters' childhood celebrity, their family environment, their treatment by psychiatric researchers, and the broader history of schizophrenia research in the United States.

== See also ==
- Hidden Valley Road, a book about another American family in which several siblings were diagnosed with schizophrenia
