= Rosenkowitz sextuplets =

First known sextuplets to survive infancy

Rosenkowitz Sextuplets
- Born: 11 January 1974 (age 51); Cape Town, South Africa

The Rosenkowitz Sextuplets (born 11 January 1974 in South Africa) were the first known set of sextuplets to survive infancy.

== Biography ==
Born to Susan Wilson at Mowbray Maternity Hospital in Cape Town, South Africa, the sextuplets are:

| Baby Order | Time of Birth | Birth Weight | Name |
|---|---|---|---|
| A | 8:02:00 a.m. | 4 lb 5 oz (2.0 kg) | David Peter |
| B | 8:02:30 a.m. | 4 lb 1 oz (1.8 kg) | Grant Vincent |
| C | 8:03:00 a.m. | 4 lb 9 oz (2.07 kg) | Jason Solomon |
| D | 8:03:30 a.m. | 4 lb 1 oz (1.8 kg) | Emma Louise |
| E | 8:04:00 a.m. | 2 lb 9 oz (1.2 kg) | Nicolette Anne |
| F | 8:04:30 a.m. | 4 lb 3 oz (1.9 kg) | Elizabeth Rebecca |

The births quickly drew international attention as the first known set of sextuplets to survive infancy. Born about four weeks early, their total birthweight was 24 lb 4 oz (11.0 kg), with the individual birthweights ranging from 2 lb 12oz (Nicolette) to 4 lb 9oz (Jason)

Mother Susan Wilson is a native Briton who emigrated to South Africa in 1967. The record shows that the father Colin divorced Susan in 1989.

As of 2013 the Rosenkowitz children lived in various locations around the world. David in Australia, Nicolette Cape Town (SA) and London (UK), Grant and Samantha in Cape Town (SA), Jason in Ireland, Emma in London (UK), and Elizabeth in Kent (UK).

== See also ==
- Dionne quintuplets: Born in 1934, the first quintuplets known to survive their infancy.
- List of multiple births
