= Gennadij Raivich =

Professor of perinatal neuroscience

- Born: New Zealand
- Occupation: Professor of Perinatal Neuroscience
- Employer: Formerly employed by University College London (UCL)
- Known for: Maternal and fetal medicine, scientific research
- Notable work: List of scientific publications (see article)
- Criminal charges: Two counts of sexual assault (convicted)
- Criminal penalty: Nine-month prison sentence, suspended for two years; £5,000 in prosecution costs

Gennadij Raivich is a professor of perinatal neuroscience, specialising in maternal and fetal medicine. He was born in New Zealand and is a qualified doctor in Germany; although he has taught in the UK he has never practised there.

In April 2013, it was revealed Raivich had been arrested by police in connection with sexual assaults. These related to his activities as a private sperm donor, often using the pseudonym 'Frank Qualman', during which he had fathered 58 children. A trial at Blackfriars Crown Court in London ended with Raivich being found guilty of two counts of sexual assault. However, he was cleared of a further eight counts of sexual assault and sexual assault by digital penetration because the jury was unable to reach a verdict.

Following the trial Raivich was given a nine-month prison sentence, suspended for two years, and ordered to pay £5,000 in prosecution costs.

At the time of his arrest, Raivich was employed by the University College London (UCL)'s Institute for Women's Health. Following the commencement of the case against him, Raivich continued to publish scientific papers; one co-authored with UCL staff was published almost a year later in March 2014. Reporting for Times Higher Education, Jack Grove reported that: "A UCL spokesman said that the institution 'took steps to ensure UCL’s interests were protected' when it became aware of the matter. But it has refused to say whether he was suspended ahead of the court case or if his role in maternal medicine had been restricted". Grove added that immediately after Raivich's conviction the college had refused to say what action it would be taking in relation to his employment. Raivich subsequently resigned from his post at UCL in September 2014.

== Publications ==
- Raivich, Gennadij, et al. "Neuroglial activation repertoire in the injured brain: graded response, molecular mechanisms and cues to physiological function." Brain Research Reviews 30.1 (1999): 77–105.
- Raivich, Gennadij, et al. "The AP-1 transcription factor c-Jun is required for efficient axonal regeneration." Neuron 43.1 (2004): 57–67.
- Raivich, Gennadij, et al. "Immune surveillance in the injured nervous system: T-lymphocytes invade the axotomized mouse facial motor nucleus and aggregate around sites of neuronal degeneration." The Journal of Neuroscience 18.15 (1998): 5804–5816.
- Raivich, Gennadij, and Richard Banati. "Brain microglia and blood-derived macrophages: molecular profiles and functional roles in multiple sclerosis and animal models of autoimmune demyelinating disease." Brain Research Reviews 46.3 (2004): 261–281.
- Raivich, Gennadij, et al. "Inhibition of Posttraumatic Microglial Proliferation in a Genetic Model of Macrophage Colony‐Stimulating Factor Deficiency in the Mouse." European Journal of Neuroscience 6.10 (1994): 1615–1618.
- Raivich, Gennadij. "Like cops on the beat: the active role of resting microglia." Trends in Neurosciences 28.11 (2005): 571–573.
- Raivich, Gennadij, Rainer Hellweg, and Georg W. Kreutzberg. "NGF receptor-mediated reduction in axonal NGF uptake and retrograde transport following sciatic nerve injury and during regeneration." Neuron 7.1 (1991): 151–164.
