= Kasawo =

- Location in Uganda
- Coordinates: 00°40′48″N 32°49′30″E
- Country: Uganda
- Region: Central Region
- District: Mukono District
- Elevation: 3,600 ft (1,100 m)

Kasawo is an urban centre in the Mukono District, Central Region of Uganda.

== Location ==
Kasawo is approximately 62 kilometres (39 mi), by road, northeast of Kampala, the capital and largest city of Uganda. This location lies on the western banks of River Sezibwa, approximately 42 kilometres (26 mi), by road, northeast of Mukono, where the district headquarters are located. The coordinates of Kasawo are 0° 40' 48.00"N, 32° 49' 30.00"E (Latitude:0.6800; Longitude:32.8250).

== Overview ==
Kasawo lies in a relatively fertile valley. The surrounding communities are sources of food crops such as bananas, pineapples, pumpkins, and sugar cane, along with cash crops like coffee.

The prevalent diseases in the community include malaria, respiratory infections, diarrheal diseases, and problems related to access of antenatal and postnatal care. HIV/AIDS prevention and treatment is also a concern.

== Recent developments ==
As of December 2013, students from Drake University, a private institution of higher education in Des Moines, Iowa, United States, in collaboration with the Shining Star Foundation, a US-based non-governmental organization, and with Des Moines Rotary AM and with Sunrise Rotary of Kampala, were in the process of building a self-sustaining Level II health center in Kasawo. The aim of the project is to relieve the acute lack of healthcare services in Kasawo and surrounding communities. The health center plans to use St. Francis Hospital Nagalama as its referral center.

== Points of interest ==
The following points of interest lie within or near Kasawo:

- offices of Kasawo Town Council
- Kasawo central market
