= Chukwu octuplets =

Fifth set of live-born octuplets in recorded history

The Chukwu octuplets were the fifth set of live-born octuplets in recorded history, and the first to have seven of eight children survive infancy. They were born in December 1998.

== Family history ==
The six girls and two boys were born in December 1998 at St. Luke's Episcopal Hospital in Houston, Texas. Their parents — mother, Nkem Chukwu and father, Iyke Louis Udobi — are both Nigerian-born American citizens.

All weighed under two pounds (900 grams) at the time of birth. The first born, Ebuka, was delivered on December 8, 15 weeks premature. The remaining 7 octuplets were born by caesarean section on December 20, 13 weeks premature. The smallest of the octuplets, Odera, died on December 27, a week after birth. She was the lightest of the 8 babies, weighing just over 300 grams (11 ounces). The obstetrician was Brian Kirshon, a well-known physician practicing in Houston.

The seven remaining octuplets celebrated their 10th birthday in Houston on December 20, 2008, in the company of volunteers who helped in their early years. The five girls and two boys were reported to be "normal, active and bright fourth-graders."

The babies were named as follows:

Full Name	Nickname	Gender	Weight at birth	Meaning
Chukwuebuka Nkemjika	Ebuka	Girl	690 g (24 oz)	God is big
Chidinma Anulika	Chidi	Girl	760 g (27 oz)	God is good
Chinecherem Nwabugwu	Eche	Girl	800 g (28 oz)	God thinks for me
Chimaijem Otto	Chima	Girl	730 g (26 oz)	God knows my journey
Chijindu Chidera	Odera	Girl	320 g (11 oz)	God holds my life
Chukwubuikem Maduabuchi	Ikem	Boy	500 g (18 oz)	God is my strength
Chijioke Chinedum	Jioke	Boy	810 g (29 oz)	God holds my share
Chinagorom Chidiebere	Gorom	Girl	520 g (18 oz)	God is my advocate

== Media appearances ==
Early January 2009, Nkem Chukwu and her husband, Iyke Louis Udobi, appeared January 27, 2009, for the first time in 10 years on national TV on ABC's Good Morning America in a prerecorded segment where they commented on the birth of the new Suleman octuplets. The next day, January 28, 2009, the whole family along with grandmother Janet Chukwu appeared on NBC's The Today Show, which was the first time the octuplets appeared on national television since their first birthdays. Later that day, they were whisked to the Associated Press (AP) World Headquarters for a TV interview for the world newswires. On Monday February 2, Nkem Chukwu released the statement: "In light of the Bellflower mom, Nadya Suleman's story, I spoke on The Today Show. When asked, Iyke Louis Udobi stated in their recent AP interview that 'if you can take care of one, you can take care of eight'. They also appeared on the Larry King Live show in a segment titled "Octuplet Outrage" focusing on the worldwide coverage generated by Nadya Suleman's 14 children and the ethical and medical controversy. On February 9, 2009, Nkem and Iyke Chukwu appeared on Radio One's talk show The Mo'Nique show. They also appeared Sunday February 15, 2009, on a local TV segment on KHOU-TV, Houston, Texas, on a family update. They also appeared on CNN's AC360 on February 18, 2009. Nkem Chukwu later addressed the Nadya Suleman octuplet row with Randi Kaye of CNN's Anderson Cooper 360 show on February 18, 2009.

The Chukwu octuplets embarked on a world tour themed "Promoting Healthy Families". The tour, which began in mid-2009 and included the United States, Canada, United Kingdom, Australia, New Zealand, England, and the parents' native Nigeria, included visits to TV talk shows, health clinics, summer camps, and supermarket seminars on large families for the children and speaking engagements at prenatal and postnatal clinics for Nkem. In a March 18, 2009, interview in The Daily Sentinel, Iyke Louis and Nkem stated said that they did not intend to have so many children but accepted the children as a gift from God.
