= Halima Cissé =

Malian mother to the world's only nonuplets

- Born: Timbuktu, Mali
- Known for: Giving birth to nonuplets
- Children: 10

Halima Cissé is a Malian woman who became the only mother confirmed to have given birth to surviving nonuplets.

== Early life ==
Cissé was born in Timbuktu, Mali. Prior to the birth of her nonuplets, she had one daughter named Sauda, with her husband, Adjudant Kader Arby, an army officer. In 2021, she was a student.

== Multiple births ==
When she was 25 years old, doctors believed that Cissé was pregnant with seven fetuses. On 30 March 2021, interim president Bah Ndaw instructed the Government of Mali to transport Cissé to Casablanca, Morocco, in order to give birth.

On 4 May 2021, her nonuplets were born prematurely at 30 weeks, by caesarean section and weighed between 500g and 1kg. The birth date had been postponed as late as possible to increase the chance of the babies surviving. The children were cared for in the Ain Borja clinic in Casablanca. Cissé was also provided with medical care for one month and required surgery after the birth.

Her children are four boys named Mohammed, Bah, Elhadji and Oumar, and five girls named Adama, Hawa, Fatouma, Oumou, and Kadidia. They were all in "perfect health" as of their first birthday, and they all celebrated their fifth birthday in 2026. According to the parents and medical staff, the nine babies were conceived naturally, unlike, e.g., the Suleman octuplets (who were conceived by IVF).

== See also ==
- List of multiple births
- Nadya Suleman, mother of the first surviving octuplets
