= John Massa Kasenene =

Ugandan scientist and academic administrator

- Born: John Massa Kasenene
- Citizenship: Ugandan
- Education: Makerere University; Michigan State University; Front Royal College
- Title: Deputy vice chancellor of Mountains of the Moon University since 2022
- Scientific career
- Fields: Conservation biology Community ecology Ecosystem ecology Restoration ecology Environmental assessment methods Higher education management
- Workplaces: Makerere University; Uganda National Council for Higher Education; Uganda Wildlife Authority; Mountains of the Moon University

John Massa Kasenene is a botanical and environmental ecologist, academic, scientist and academic administrator in Uganda. Since 4 October 2022, he has been the substantive deputy vice chancellor of the Mountains of the Moon University (MMU), which was then the tenth public university in the country.

From 25 January 2019 until 4 October 2022, he served as the vice chairman of the four-person Task Force Committee, established by the Cabinet Minister of Education and Sports to superintend the transition of MMU from a private university to a public institution.

== Background and education ==
Kasenene is a Ugandan national. He earned a Bachelor of Science in Biology and a concurrent Diploma in Education from Makerere University, the oldest and largest public university in Uganda. He then earned a Master of Science degree in Plant Ecology, also from Makerere. His degree of Doctor of Philosophy in Forest Ecology was awarded by Michigan State University, in East Lansing, Michigan, United States. He also obtained certificates in primatology and field research methods from institutions in the state of Virginia, United States.

== Career ==
Kasenene has been teaching and lecturing since 1982 in the areas he specialized in. Before 2011, he was the professor of Forestry Ecology in the Department of Botany at Makerere University. He concurrently served as a senior research and training fellow at Makerere University's Biological Field Station in Kibale National Park.

From 2011 until 2022, he was the vice chancellor of Mountains of the Moon University. In that capacity, he was the chief academic and administrative officer of the institution, equivalent to a CEO, when the institution was privately owned. On 4 October, he was appointed deputy vice chancellor of MMU, responsible for administration and outreach, in the now public institution.

== Academic authorship ==
Kasenene has contributed to plant and forest ecology through his research, which has been published in several academic journals and databases. His work includes the following articles:

- "The influence of mechanized selective logging, felling intensity and gap-size on the regeneration of a tropical moist forest in the Kibale Forest Reserve, Uganda." This article established that mechanized selective timber harvesting in species-rich tropical moist forest was hard to control and incompatible with minimizing damage and disturbances or creation of forest gaps characteristic of natural forest disturbances.
- "On the Diversity of Malaria Parasites in African Apes and the Origin of Plasmodium falciparum from Bonobos". The study found that chimpanzees and bonobos maintain malaria parasites, to which humans are susceptible, a factor of some relevance to the renewed efforts to eradicate malaria.
- "Medicinal plant diversity and uses in the Sango bay area, Southern Uganda". This article established an inventory for the medicinal plants of the Sango bay area in southern Uganda.
- "Traditional plants used for medicinal purposes by local communities around the Northern sector of Kibale National Park, Uganda". The article established medicinal plants used in the treatment of various diseases by the people in the northern sector of Kibale National Park in western Uganda. Novel antimalarial compounds isolated in a survey of self-medicative behaviour of wild chimpanzees in Uganda.
- "Antiplasmodial and cytotoxic activities of medicinal plants traditionally used in the village of Kiohima, Uganda". This article investigated in vitro the antiplasmodial and cytotoxic activities of selected medicinal plants at Kiohima village, located close to the Kibale National Park in southwestern Uganda.
- "Elephants, selective logging and forest regeneration in the Kibale Forest, Uganda". This articled proposed that rather than remove elephants, a more effective and humane approach to long-term management of logging is to reduce logging offtake and incidental damage caused by timber extraction.
- "Small rodent populations in selectively felled and mature tracts of Kibale Forest, Uganda".
- "Density and species diversity of trees in four tropical forests of the Albertine rift, western Uganda". This study assessed tree species density and diversity in 12 1-ha plots in four forests of the Albertine rift, western Uganda.
- "Suitable habitats for endangered frugivorous mammals: Small-scale comparison, regeneration forest and Chimpanzee density in Kibale National Park, Uganda". The article established the factors explaining chimpanzee density by comparing results from two other sites in Kibale: Kanyawara (low chimpanzee density) and Ngogo (high density, and furthest from Sebitoli).
- "Nodular worm infection in wild chimpanzees in Western Uganda: A risk for human health?" This article focused on Oeosophagostomum sp., and more especially on O. bifurcum, as a parasite that can be lethal to humans and is widespread among humans and monkeys in endemic regions, but has not yet been documented in apes.
- "Hydroperoxy-cycloartane triterpenoids from the leaves of Markhamia lutea, a plant ingested by wild chimpanzees". The study established that crude ethyl acetate extract of M. lutea leaves exhibited significant in vitro anti-parasitic activity and low cytotoxicity against MRC5 and KB cells. Aboveground carbon stocks, woody and litter productivity along an elevational gradient in the Rwenzori Mountains, Uganda. Tropical forest management: can rates of natural treefalls help guide us?
- "Cycloartane triterpenes from the leaves of Neoboutonia macrocalyx L". The article investigated the phytochemical on the leaves of Neoboutonia macrocalyx L plant which is used by people in southwestern Uganda around Kibale National Park in the treatment of malaria.
- "Post-logging tree mortality and major branch losses in Kibale Forest, Uganda". This study established whether selective felling and the existence of large forest gaps influence the dynamics of tree and branch falls.
- "Impact of exotic plantations and harvesting methods on the regeneration of indigenous tree species in Kibale forest, Uganda". This article assessed the effect of logging exotic plantations and the methods of harvesting on the young regeneration of indigenous tree species. Investigations on anopheline mosquitoes close to the nest sites of chimpanzees subject to malaria infection in Ugandan Highlands.
- "Tree mortality in the Kibale Forest, Uganda: A case study of dieback in a tropical rain forest adjacent to exotic conifer plantations". This study recommended that exotic trees, particularly conifers, should not be planted near natural forests in the tropics.
- "Antiplasmodial compounds from the stem bark of Neoboutonia macrocalyx pax".

== See also ==
- List of university leaders in Uganda
