= Barbara Stratzmann =

Mother of 53 children

Barbara Stratzmann (née Schmotzer; born around 1448; died 1503) from Bönnigheim is said to have been the mother with the most children in the area of present-day Germany at the time of the Holy Roman Empire. This woman, who was called the "Schmotzerin" because of her birth name, is said to have had a total of 53 children with her husband Adam Stratzmann (died 1504), all of whom died young.

== Historical sources ==
The child miracle of Bönnigheim is described in written documents. On St Thomas' Day (21 December) in 1498, the notary Friedrich Deumling from Wimpfen recorded the "true historia" of the "Schmotzerin's" abundance of children: "I hereby confess with my handwriting that I have heard all this from this woman myself, and thus also written".

In the 1498 record, Barbara Stratzmann told how the number of her 53 children was made up: According to it, she was pregnant 29 times and gave birth: 18 times to singletons, 5 times to twins, 4 times to triplets, once to sextuplets, and once to septuplets. 19 children were stillborn, the oldest child lived to be only eight years old.

Sometime between 1500 and 1525, the late Gothic painting of the Protestant Cyriakuskirche of Bönnigheim was created, which depicts the "Schmotzerin" and her husband with their 53 children under the birth of Jesus in the stable at Bethlehem. The father and 38 sons kneel to the left of the viewer, the mother and 15 daughters to the right. Banners state the year of death of the woman and her husband, while a poem praises the wealth of children born to Barbara Stratzmann, who had "38 legitimate sons and 15 daughters, totalling 53 in one marriage". It goes on to say that there will probably never be another woman like her in all the lands and kingdoms. In 1509, Emperor Maximilian (1459–1519), who was staying in Vaihingen an der Enz and Stuttgart at the time, requested a report from the town of Binickheim (Bönnigheim) about the "Schmotzerin's" blessing of children, which someone had informed him about. He received the desired reply on 29 June of that year, the wording of which is known.

== Truthfulness of the report ==
It is unclear to what extent the account is correct. Hermann Krieg, head physician at the Municipal Gynaecological Clinic in Heilbronn, contradicted the historical account in an article in the Heilbronner Stimme (12 May 1990). He based his opinion on the statistical occurrence of multiple births, the complications to be expected in the context of multiple pregnancies and the medical conditions of the time, which made it unlikely that the woman would survive.

== Literature ==
- C. Lauritzen u. G. Göretzlehner: Die kinderreichste Frau Deutschlands, in: Journal für Fertilität und Reproduktion No. 9, 1999

== See also ==
- List of people with the most children
