= Monneron family =

French family of businessmen and politicians

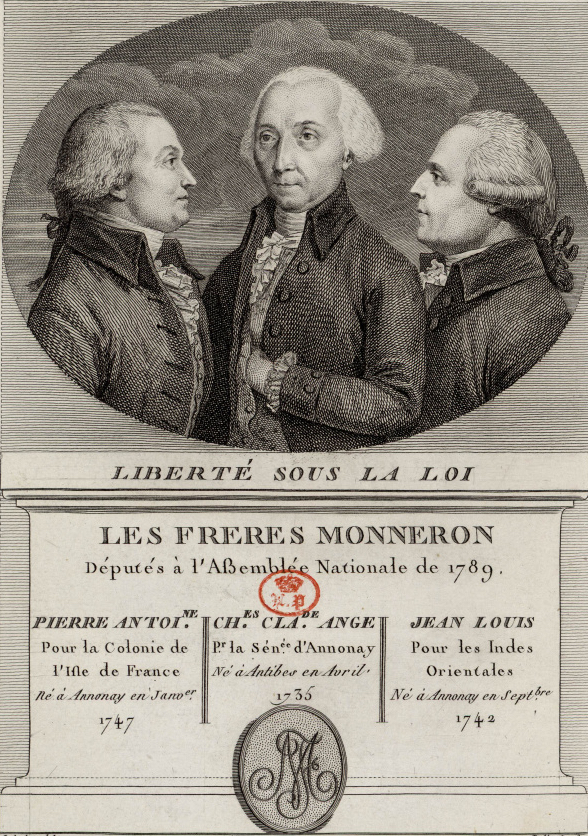
The Monneron brothers, from left to right: Pierre-Antoine, Charles-Claude-Ange, and Jean-Louis

The Monneron family was a French family of businessmen and politicians, best known for the Monneron brothers.

It originated in the small village of Ampurany near Tournon-sur-Rhône, but has been set up in Chanos since 1550. Antoine Monneron and his wife Barbe Arnault had 20 children, 8 of whom died in infancy. They lived successively in Antibes, Tournon (1737), and Annonay (1739) where Antoine bought the position of receiver of the grenier à sel tax. Antoine was also a lawyer to the Parlement and controller-general of the Fermes du Roi to the Parlement d'Antibes.

== Bank ==
Les Frères Monneron was built up in England by Matthew Boulton, thanks to the steam engine of James Watt, producing 2 and 5 sols coins in great quantities in the Soho factory in Birmingham from the end of 1791.

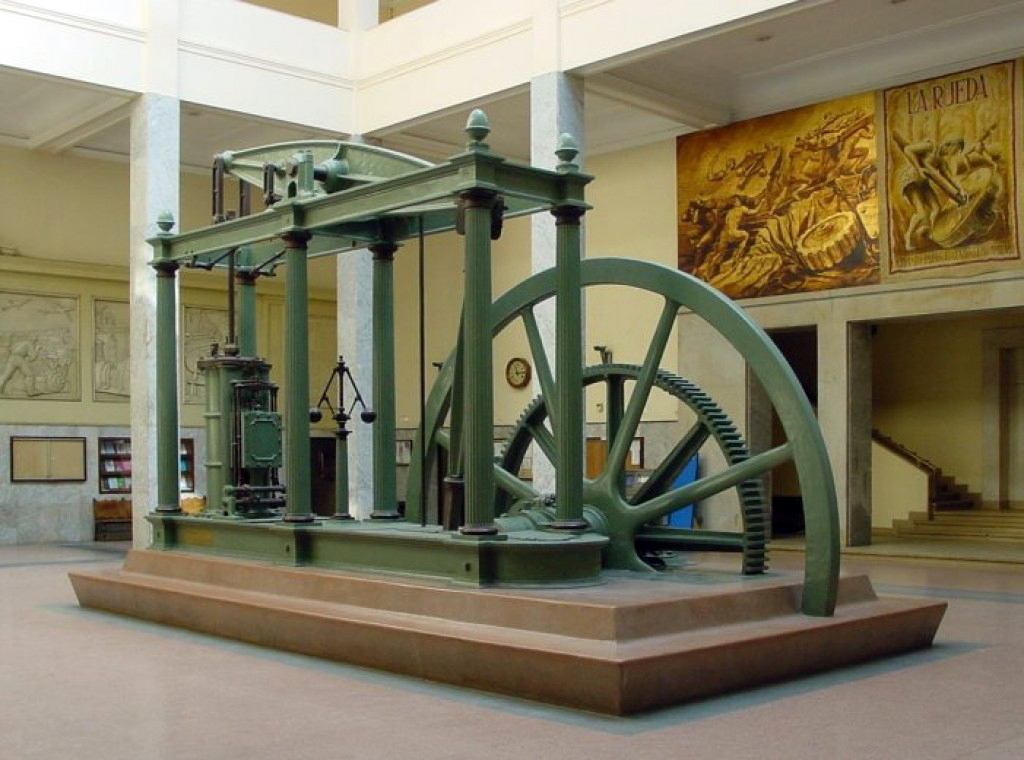
Watt's steam engine.

These pieces of necessity money eased the coinage shortage then current in France and their technical and aesthetic quality was much superior to mediocre base metal issues produced by official sources.

In March 1792, the Monnerons went bankrupt and Pierre fled. His brother Augustin took over the business, but a law of 3 May 1792 forbade the production of money by private concerns. In September a decree forbade the commercialisation of confidence-coins. These necessary coins were in circulation until the end of 1793.

== Family tree ==
           o Antoine III Monneron 1703–1791
               o Antoine Nicolas Monneron 1733-1733
               o Charles Claude Ange Monneron 1735–1799
               o Antoine Joseph Monneron 1736–1815
                   o Joseph-Camille Monneron 1792
                   o Claudine-Sophie Monneron 1795
                   o Olimpe Monneron 1797
               o Jean Antoine Monneron 1737
                   o Pierre Antoine Monneron 1773–1800
                       o Herminie Monneron
                       o Eucharie Monneron 1797–1815
                       o Egérie Monneron 1800
                   o Louis Nicolas Monneron 1775–1817
                       o Ernest Nicolas Antoine Monneron 1818
                           o Alice Monneron
                           o Marie Amélie Henriette Monneron 1847–1914
                           o Marie Céline Monneron
                       o Henriette Monneron
               o Louis Henri Monneron 1738–1739
               o Catherine Thérèse Monneron 1740-1740
               o Gaspard François Monneron 1741–1825
                   o Louisa Monneron 1789
                   o Malcy Monneron 1794–1856
               o Jean Louis Monneron 1742–1805
                   o Lise Monneron
                   o Cécile Monneron
               o Giron François Monneron 1743–1747
               o Jean Marie Monneron 1744–1811
               o Marie Elisabeth Monneron 1745
               o Pierre Antoine Monneron 1747–1801
                   o Amédée Monneron
                   o Adèle Monneron
                   o Aurore Antoinette Marie Zoé Monneron +1805
                   o Aurore Monneron
                   o Jeanne Lucille Mézereon Monneron 1796–1848
               o Paul Mérault Monneron 1748–1788
               o Gaspard Claude Monneron 1749-1749
               o Barbe Catherine Madeleine Monneron 1750-1750
               o Jeanne Françoise Etiennette Monneron 1751–1752
               o Pierre Madeleine Monneron 1753-1753
               o Jean Chrysostome Janvier Monneron 1754–1811
                   o Charles Monneron 1795–1857
                   o Elisabeth Monneron 1796–1838
                   o Jenny Monneron 1798–1874
                   o Aristide Monneron 1799–1834
                       o Janvier Auguste Monneron 1822–1877
                           o Marie Antoine Aristide Monneron 1848–1878
                           o Augusta Philomène Marie Monneron 1849–1911
                           o "Marie Véronique Nathalie Monneron 1851–1928
                           o Marie Josèphe Emilie Monneron 1854–1896
                           o Augusta Marie Zoé Monneron
                   o Alcide Monneron 1800–1879
               o Joseph François Augustin Monneron 1756–1826
                   o Augustine Monneron
                   o Nn Monneron
                       o Paul H Monneron
                           o Hattie Monneron 1889–1966
               o Jeanne Marie Jacobé Monneron 1758–1799
       o Gaspard Monneron

== Sources ==
- site geneanet samlap
