= Annonay =

- Commune
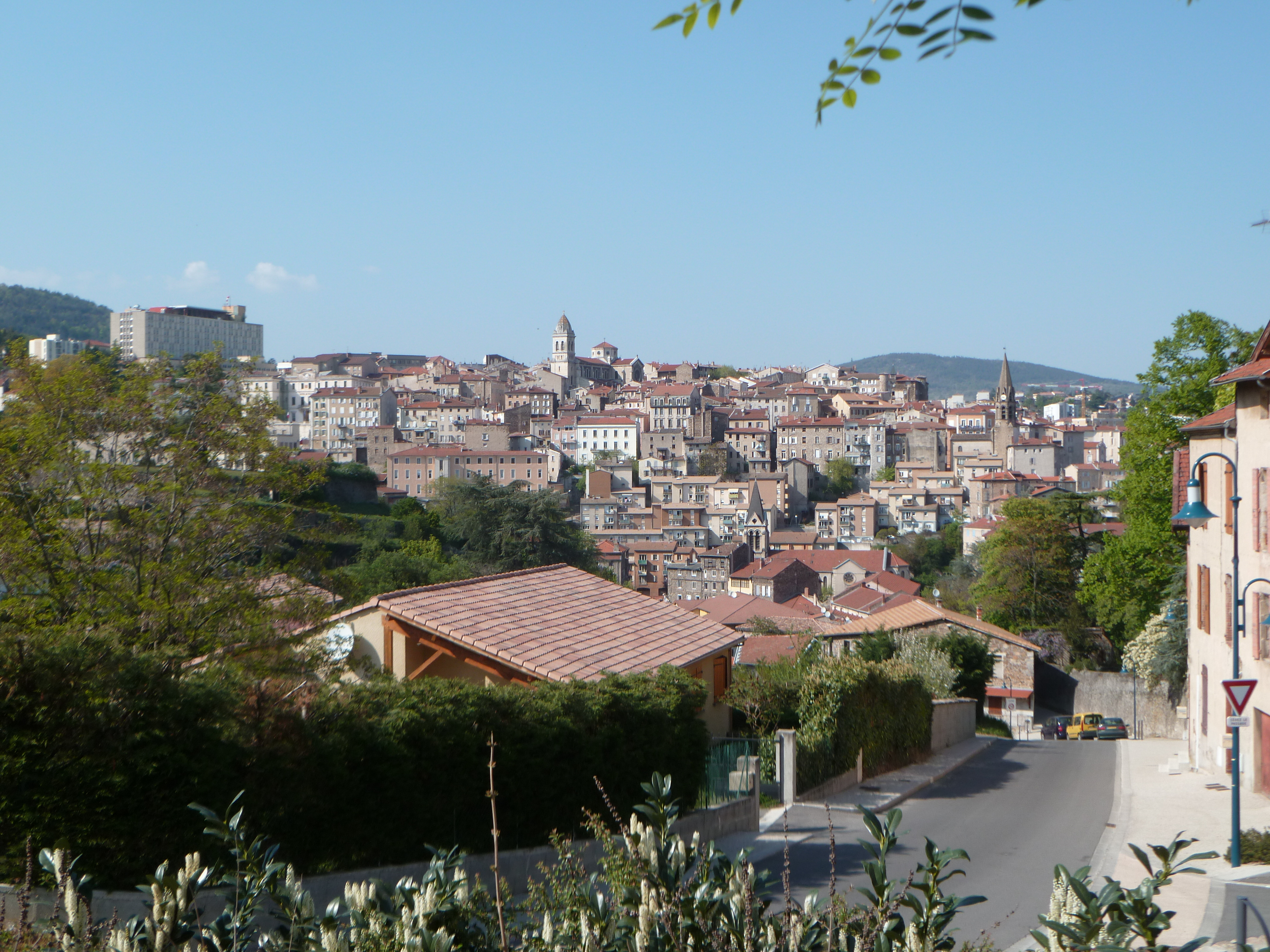
- Annonay, view from the Aygas rise

- Coat of arms
- Location of Annonay
- Location within France Location within Auvergne-Rhône-Alpes
- Coordinates: 45°14′27″N 4°40′17″E
- Country: France
- Region: Auvergne-Rhône-Alpes
- Department: Ardèche
- Arrondissement: Tournon-sur-Rhône
- Canton: Annonay-1, Annonay-2
- Intercommunality: Annonay Rhône Agglo

Government
  - Mayor (2020–2026): Simon Plenet
- Area^{1}: 21.20 km^{2} (8.19 sq mi)
- Elevation: 358 m (1,175 ft)
- Highest elevation: 746 m (2,448 ft)
- Lowest elevation: 270 m (890 ft)
- Population (2023): 17,274
  - Density: 814.8/km^{2} (2,110/sq mi)
- Demonym(s): Annonéens (m); Annonéennes (f)
- Time zone: UTC+01:00 (CET)
  - Summer (DST): UTC+02:00 (CEST)
- INSEE/Postal code: 07010 /07100
- ^{1} French Land Register data, which excludes lakes, ponds, glaciers > 1 km^{2} (0.386 sq mi or 247 acres) and river estuaries.

Annonay (French pronunciation: [anɔnɛ]; Occitan: Anonai) is a commune and largest town in the north of the Ardèche department in the Auvergne-Rhône-Alpes region of southeastern France. It is the most populous commune in the Ardèche department although it is not the capital which is the smaller town of Privas. Other communes in the Ardèche department are Aubenas, Guilherand-Granges, and Tournon-sur-Rhône.

== Geography ==
The commune consists of the city of Annonay and the hamlets of Vissenty, Chatinais, and Boucieu. With residential development, these four entities have merged into one today. Further away is the hamlet of Toissieu.

Annonay was built over several small hills at the confluence of the rivers Cance (Canse) and Deûme (Deôme). Annonay is a crossroads of trade routes: from the Rhône Valley to the region of Saint-Étienne (east-west) and from Lyon to south of the Massif Central (north-south). It is located 75 km (47 mi) south of Lyon, 13 km (8 mi) south-west of Saint-Rambert-d'Albon, and 13 km (8 mi) north-west of Saint-Vallier at the foot of the mountains of Vivarais just 6 km (4 mi) west of the river Rhône. Access to the commune is by the D121 from Davezieux in the north-east passing through the commune and the city and continuing to Villevocance in the south-west. There is also the D578 from the city to Quintenas in the south and the D206 to Saint-Marcel-les-Annonay in the north. There are also the D371 and the D370 in the east of the commune.

The geology consists mainly of grey or light orange leucogranite and orthogneiss rich in biotite, sillimanite, and cordierite with alternating bands of felsic and mafic material. The escarpment of Annonay is surrounded by plateaux and gentle hills used for cultivating cherries, apricots, apples, pears, and other crops. A reservoir created by damming the Ternay River north-west of the town provides water for industrial and domestic use. The highest point of the town at 746 meters (2,448 ft) is located near a place called "Sagne Ronde"; the lowest point at 270 meters (890 ft) is the bed of the Cance near the ruins of the "Mill Baru". The Montmiandon overlooking the city, rises to 679 meters (2,228 ft) above sea level.

== Name ==
The origin of the name of the town has numerous hypotheses. One of these suggests that Annonay comes from Annoniacum meaning the domain of an "Annonius", a rich Roman who lived there. Another explanation is that Annonay came from the presence of a food store of the praefectus annonae. In any case, the site of the city has been occupied since antiquity. Roman coins and medals were found during the digging of the Rue Malleval in 1851.

== History ==
=== Middle Ages ===
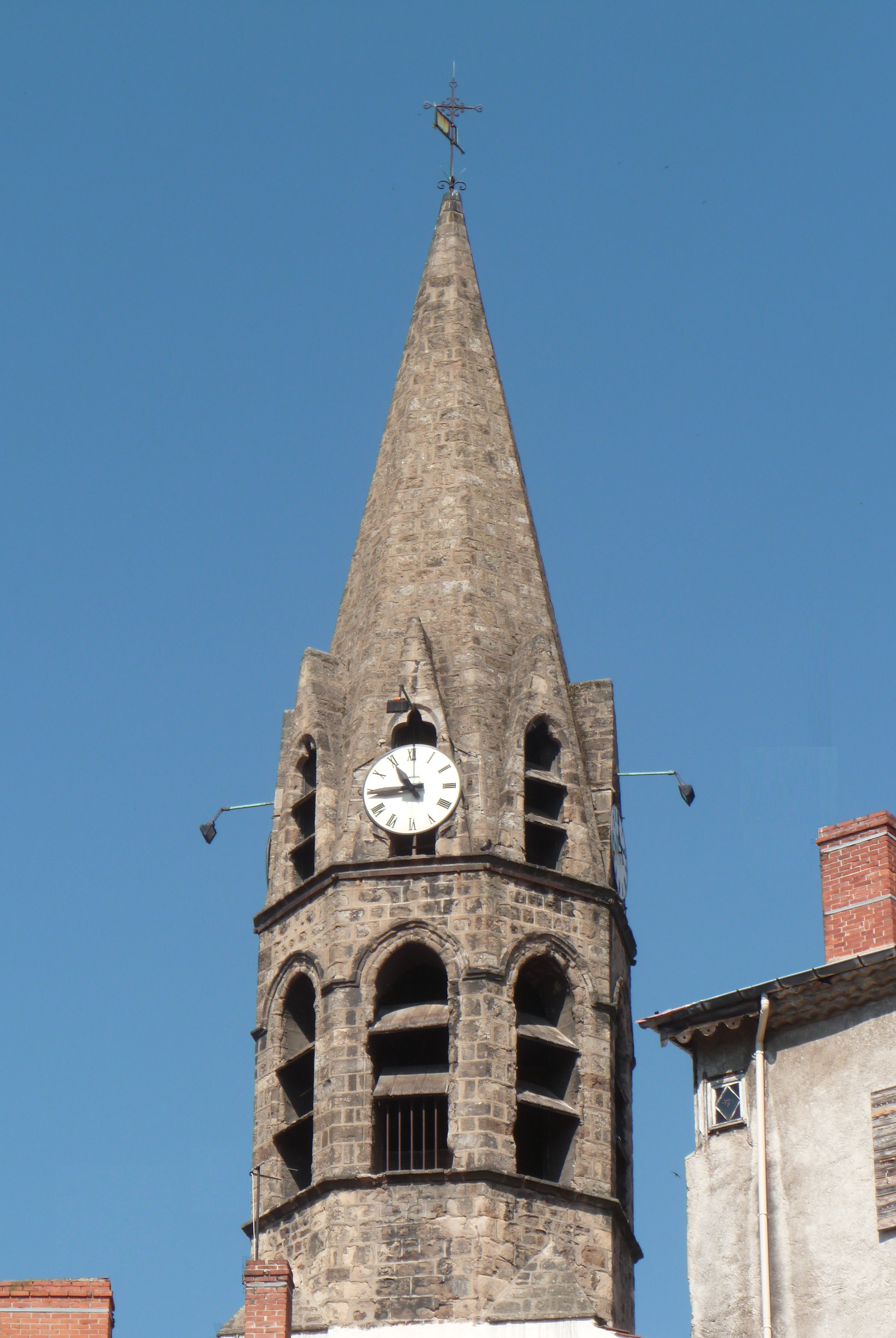
Bell Tower of the Trachin Chapel

The first written mention of Annonay dates from 403. A chronicle of archives in Vienne characterized the city as a small town "built by poor unclothed workers lost in the mountains of Haut-Vivarais".

A manuscript which has now disappeared, History of Annonay by P. Bartholomew Popon stated that Evance, Bishop of Vienne, had built on the site of Liberty Square a church dedicated to Saint-Mary or Our Lady in 584.

A charter of 790 ("The statutes of the Church of Vienne"), confirmed in 805, extracted from the cartulary of the Church of Vienne and quoted Annonay as the seat of a rural archpriest.

In the 13th and early 14th centuries, the small town of Annonay was an important step on the road of pilgrimage to the Virgin of Puy-en-Velay. In witness to this hostelries for pilgrims, five monasteries including the Saint-Clair Convent, one Cordelier, and two priories one of which was the Chapel of Trachin.

The family de Roussillon dominated the region. One of its members, Guillaume de Roussillon, participated in the Crusades. From 1288 a charter was signed between the city and the Lord of Annonay. This granted some autonomy to the city: in particular the right to levy taxes.

In 1342 or 1347, Annonay suffered the Black Death which raged in Europe. A large part of the population was decimated. From 1365 two consuls were responsible for the city.

During the 15th century, Annonay affirmed itself as a commercial crossroads: exporting its wine, trading between the valley of the Rhône, the Dauphiné and the mountain by mule, the tannery developed using the waters of the Deume. The city, built on a rocky outcrop located between two rivers, was defended by the castle of Roussillon in the south and two fortified houses: in the north Maleton and in the west Du Peloux. A line of ramparts ringed all. The suburbs grew towards the Champ de Mars along the banks of the Cance and Deume. The relative prosperity however attracted thieves, highwaymen, and mercenaries. During the Hundred Years War the city strengthened its fortifications with watchtowers, such as the so-called Martyrs Tower. The walls were pierced by gates to control the entrance and exit to the city. There are written references to the Deume, Cance, and Champ entrances, to mention only the most important.

In 1487 the city had fourteen churches or chapels for about two thousand inhabitants. At the center of town was the parish Church of Notre Dame to which was attached a college of canons of the order of Saint-Ruf. Until the Wars of Religion clerics represented up to half of the population.

=== Modern times (16th and 17th centuries) ===
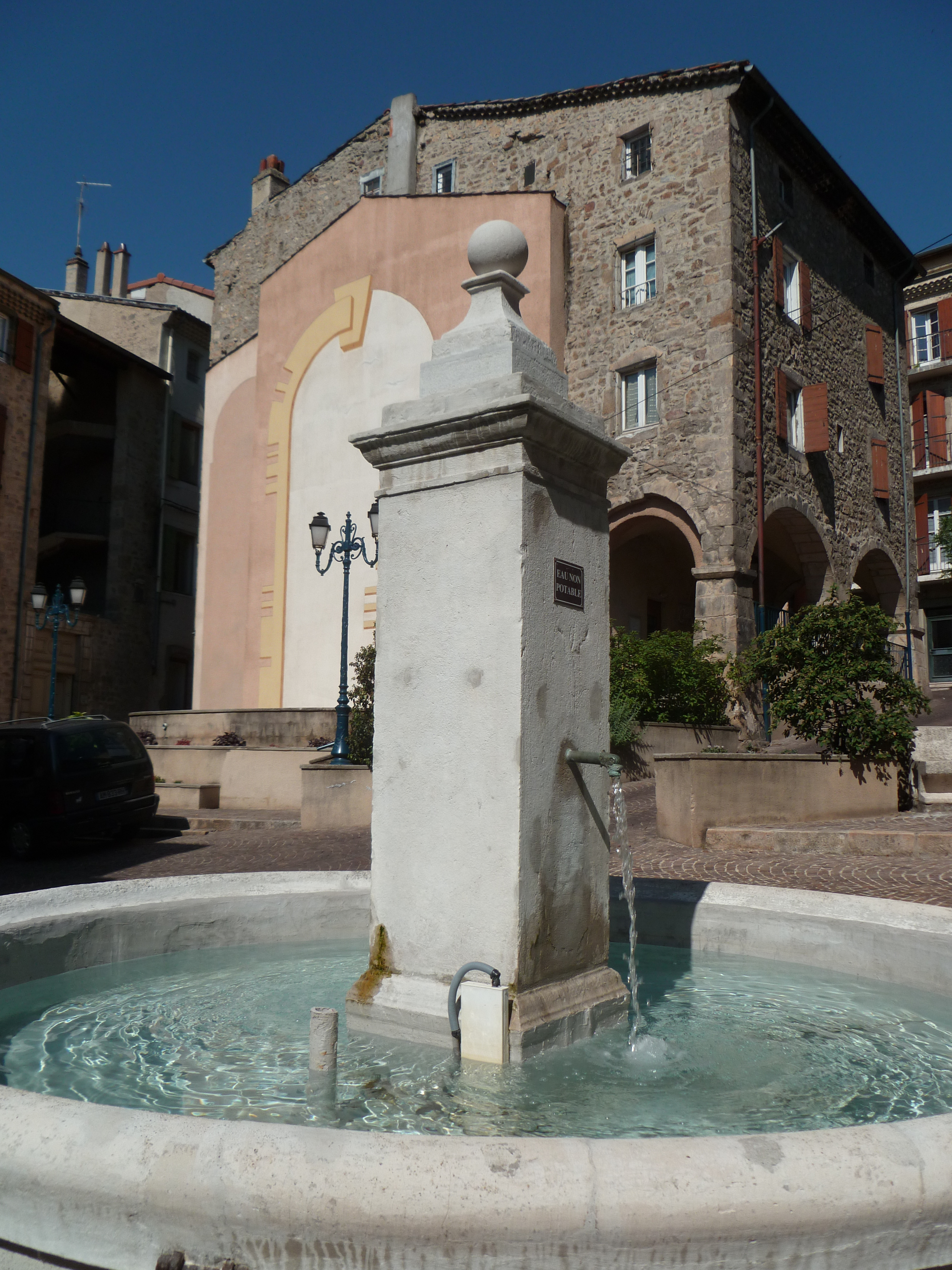
The Place Grenette

In 1524 Annonay was attached to the domain of the King of France in the wake of the revolt by the Constable of Bourbon: his property, which included Annonay, was confiscated. The country was then dominated by the Lévis-Ventadour, the Rohan-Soubises etc.

==== Wars of Religion ====
During this period Annonay had 3,500 inhabitants. The districts of Cance and Deume were neglected by the wealthy in favor of the Place Vielle (Old Square – now the Place de la Liberté or Liberty Square), Place Grenette, Rue des Forges (formerly Main Street and today Rue Franki Kramer).

Annonay adopted Protestantism before Geneva. From 1528 a Franciscan friar, Etienne Machopolis – who had heard Martin Luther preach in Saxony, spread the new ideas. In 1539 two merchants from Annonay were burned alive for spreading the ideas of Luther. It was the excesses of the clergy that pushed people into the arms of the Reformation. Moreover, in the region Protestants such as the Benay family had developed the culture of silkworms and protected the Italian artisans who came to develop the silk mills.

Annonay, when in the hands of Protestants, was taken for the first time in 1562 by the Catholic troops of Christophe of Saint-Chamond, Lord of Thorrenc and Andance. The city was retaken at the end of 1562 by the Protestants led by Jean de Saint-Romain, his own brother. Saint-Romain and his troops destroyed the Catholic places of worship in Annonay except for the Trachin Chapel which became a Protestant temple. On 10 January 1563 three thousand Catholics commanded by Saint-Chamond dislodged them from Annonay. The city was sacked in five days. The Edict of Amboise (March 1563) restored peace by giving Protestants freedom of worship in bailiwicks such as Annonay. To this misfortune was added another: plague broke out in 1564.

In 1568 the Protestants of Saint-Romain seized Annonay and slaughtered the college of Notre Dame. A few months later, in September, Catholics, under the command of Saint-Chamond, retook the city again. The troops of Saint-Romain reverted to the masters of Annonay on 17 July 1574. The houses of Cance and Bourgville districts were razed and the ramparts ruined, college and various Annonay chapels were completely destroyed except the Trachin Chapel. From 1574 the Protestant Lord Jean de Fay of Virieu was sent by Henry III to negotiate peace between Catholics and Protestants. A compromise was found in the castle of La Condamine: the Protestant lord was responsible for controlling the locations in the region which were disarmed. An edict of pacification was granted in 1577. The city then had a long period of peace but in the short term trade and industry were destroyed. The city, in ruins, had only 300 fires or about 1500 inhabitants. Religious orders were expelled. In 1583, 1584, and 1585, poor harvests caused inflation, food shortages, and famine. Plague wreaked havoc in Upper Vivarais.

With the signing of the Edict of Nantes the city regained prosperity. At the end of the 16th century thirty tanneries were located on the banks of the Deume and Cance, attracted by the quality of their waters and the prosperous farms nearby. The tanneries grew. There were 11 Tanners and 4 Dressers in 1590; there were 20 and 37 respectively in 1704.

=== 17th–18th centuries ===
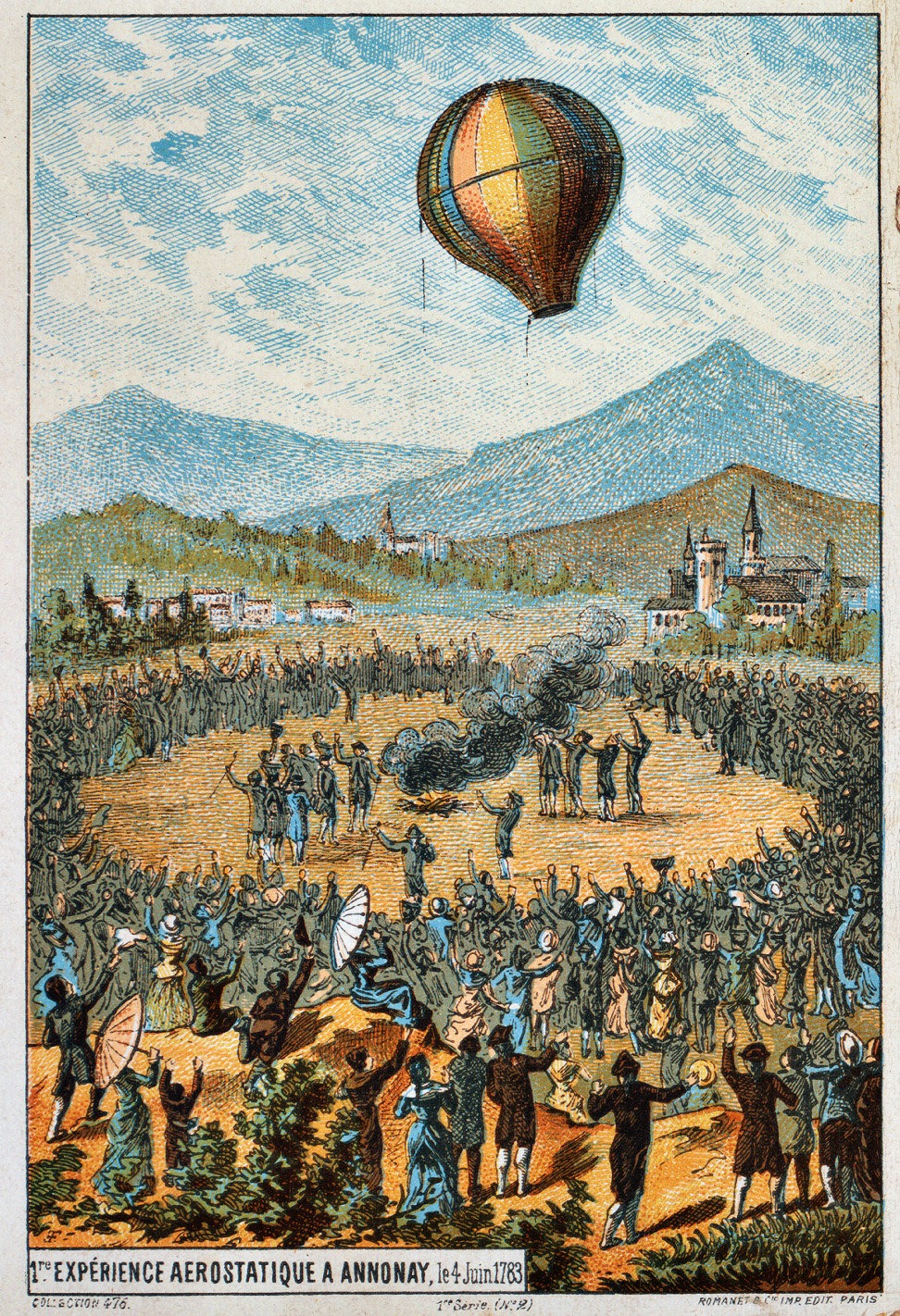
The first flight of the balloon of the Montgolfier brothers

Catholicism became the new majority in the capital of Upper Vivarais due to the massive influx of foreign population. Reconstruction of the Church of Notre Dame was undertaken with a constrained budget. Meanwhile, the Trachin Chapel, the only intact religious building, became the parish church. A Protestant church was built in the district of the Place Saint-Ursula. In September 1601 Annonay received a visit by the future Saint Francis de Sales and a little later from the future Saint John Francis Regis. The reconstruction of the city was characterized by the arrival of new religious communities and the creation of educational institutions such as the Convent of Santa Maria. A new hospital, joining the medieval structures of Notre-Dame La Belle and Notre-Dame de l'Aumône was created on 16 March 1686 at the Champ-de-Mars.

In 1685 the revocation of the Edict of Nantes affected Annonay. Protestants who were at that time 50% of the population had to choose between exile, abjuration, or to continue practicing their religion in secret. The Protestants were mostly artisans, manufacturers, wine-growers, and traders. A century later a census showed that there were only 7% Protestants mostly from the upper classes.

The paper industry was started in Annonay in the 17th century with the Montgolfier brothers, papermakers originating from Auvergne, installed at Vidalon-lès-Annonay (today a hamlet in the commune of Davézieux). The Johannots, another Auvergne family, had been settled in Faya since 1634. Attracted to the water quality, the driving force of the rivers, and the abundance of raw materials (rags), they imported technological innovations from Holland: e.g. the Dutch pile.

In the maze of streets and small squares of Annonay, there was progress with the commissioning in 1726 of four public fountains fed by captive water sources.

In 1780 industrial production was booming: 25,000 cow hides and 500,000 sheep skins were processed by the tanneries. Paper mills produced 300 tons of paper. This success did not go smoothly: the employment in great numbers of the best workers by Montgolfier caused a scarcity of labor and demands for wage increases. There was a strike for two months in the Vidalon Workshop in late 1781 after a long period of tension between the employer and his employees, the first lost the best of his workforce through his intransigent attitude at a time when fights between gavots and journeymen were common.

In 1781, the term Bailiage was changed to Sénéchaussée.

On 14 December 1782, thanks to Etienne and Joseph Montgolfier, the first balloon rose above Vidalon-lès-Annonay. It consisted of a large paper bag lined with cloth placed over a fire of wet straw and wool. It remained however a private experience: the first public official flight in a hot air balloon took place on 4 June 1783 at Annonay, or precisely from the Place des Cordeliers – in front of a chosen public: the Members of State particularly of Vivarais. Several other inventions are credited to Joseph Montgolfier: the hydraulic ram, the method of manufacture of Wove paper and filter paper, called joseph paper.

Annonay developed through trade. It benefited from an improved road network (even if it was as a result of the revolt of camisards). In 1787 Annonay had 130 merchants for about 7,000 inhabitants. Among them: 11 drapers, 11 clothiers, 26 grocers, 3 goldsmiths, 26 shoe merchants, and 28 tailors. At the same time, the Catholic parish of the city was headed by a priest-archpriest, and vicars. The college of canons was composed of the prior and twelve canons. The monastery of the Poor Clares had twelve nuns and two lay sisters, the Convent of Santa Maria had thirty nuns and four lay sisters. Adding to this religious presence was the pastor of the Protestant community.

=== French Revolution ===
The French Revolution started down this organization. The region was characterized by a wave of dechristianization which caused a certain spirit of resistance among the Catholic and Protestant populations. The Terror made victims such as Pierre-François Dulau-Dallemand, the pastor of Saint-Julien-Vocance; Bartholomew Montblanc, Vicar at Givors hidden around Annonay, and the priests of Rouville, Bac-et-Guards, and former Jesuits. To them must be added the three Sisters of Saint-Joseph from the community of Vernosc-lès-Annonay.

The representatives of Annonay, while being very favorable to the new order, adopted a moderate attitude. This moderation was well illustrated by the personality of the lawyer Boissy d'Anglas, closely linked to the Girondins. André Joseph Abrial, a native of Annonay, became Minister of Justice and was an author of the Civil Code (Code Napoleon).

=== 19th century ===
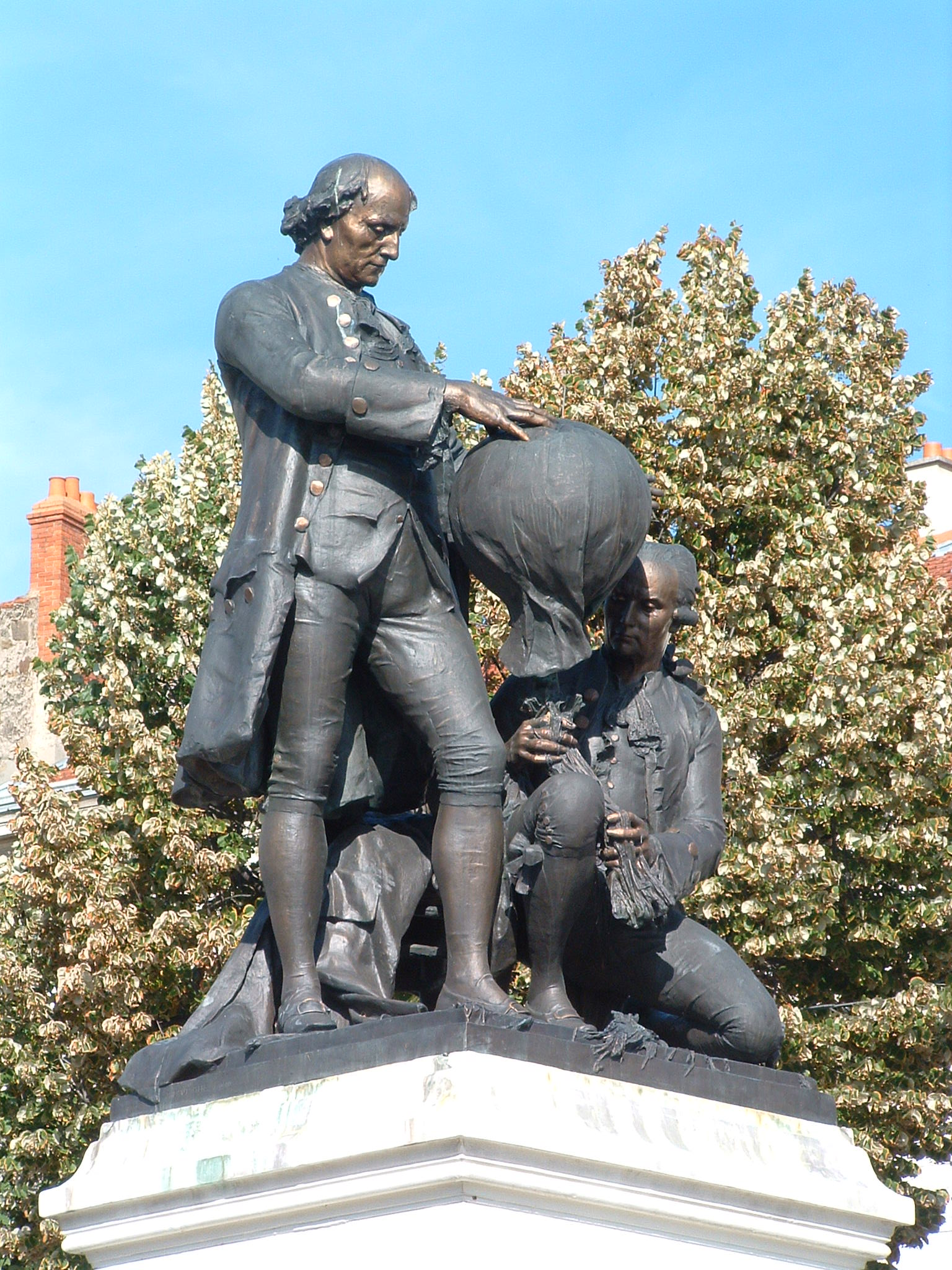
Statue of the Montgolfier brothers (1883–1885)

During the first half of the 19th century, the need for an industrial workforce for paper-making and leather at Annonay attracted population from the surrounding countryside. The number of inhabitants doubled from 5,550 in 1801 to 11,398 in 1846 (it would reach 18,445 inhabitants in 1866). The physiognomy of the city changed with the rapid development or opening of new shopping streets (Rues Sadi Carnot, Montgolfier, Boissy d'Anglas, Tournon, Melchior de Vogue). A new city hall was built in a developing area.

In 1822, the Congregation of St. Basil, a Catholic order of priests was founded in the town.

On 26 February 1848, the city workers violently showed their support for the revolutionary Parisians (during February 1848), including the stoning of houses belonging to notable people. The army maintained order.

With demographic pressure, the size of the existing infrastructure including the sole Catholic church did not allow proper welcoming of new residents to the faith. Two new churches were built: Saint-Francis and Saint-Joseph. Around the city, about a kilometer or two new town houses were built in the image of the Domain of Marc Seguin or Déomas Castle constituting a "sunbelt".

The tannery rode the industrial prosperity of Annonay. High-end gloves were made in Grenoble but the best skins came from Annonay. In 1870 the Annonay tannery processed 8 million skins and employed 50% of the workers in the city. Three thousand of them were working at the time in this industry.

Improving the road network and creating the first lines of railway put an end to Annonay's role as a commercial center for the mountainous hinterland. The latter was now in direct contact with Saint-Étienne. The east–west trade that were advantageous to Annonay were replaced by north–south trade particularly following the valley of the Rhône. From now on Annonay, although the hometown of Marc Seguin, would be connected to the railway network by a branch line.

The Franco-Prussian War of 1870 blocked exports: the stocks of the Annonay works were blocked for a time in Paris. This crisis began the decline of the tanneries in Annonay compounded by weak industrial investment. More than 2,000 employees were laid off to go and find work in other areas.

Barthélémy Baru Canson married the daughter of Étienne de Montgolfier. New processes of papermaking were established and production became specialized. The paper mill employed 1,500 people around 1875. Such activity requires a lot of water which was supplied by the Ternay reservoir from 1867. Its water was also distributed to residents through standpipes positioned in each district.

While modern community life was started with the creation of the first sports clubs such as Annonéenne, a company gym which still exists; the nascent local press reported on events such as celebrations marking the centenary of the first flight of a balloon. Annonay improved its main entrance by creating a new road connecting the PLM station to the center of town: the Boulevard of the Republic (1883–1888).

=== The 20th century ===
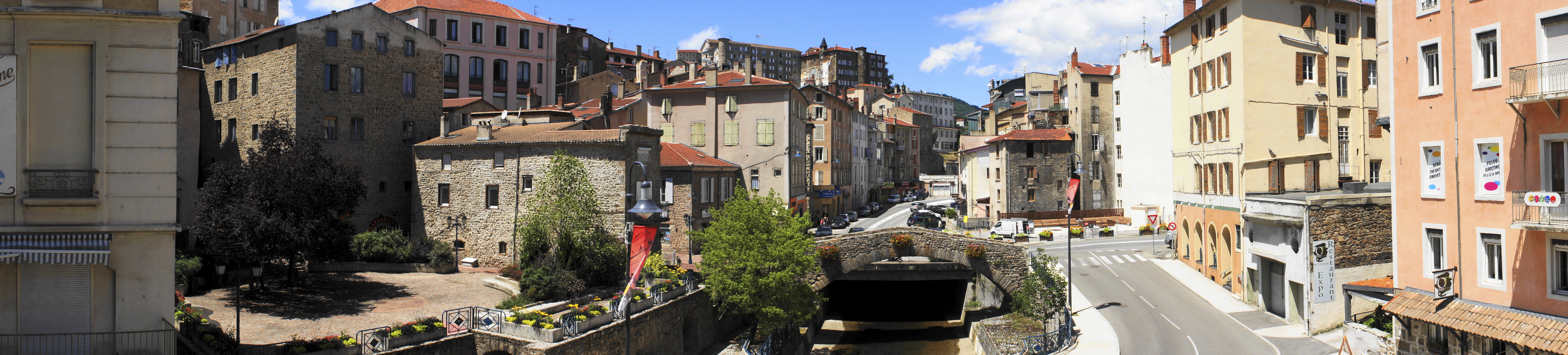
Valgelas Bridge

In the early 20th century, the city still retained its appearance after the Wars of religion except for the Station district. Construction works were mainly concentrated in the industrial valleys of Cance and Deume. The historic center saw the building of Annonay's first department store "Les Galeries Modernes" (currently Public Service offices) and reconstruction on another site of the historic church of Notre-Dame. At this time the magic of electricity came (1910). The telephone was known and used. The national news with the laws on religious congregations and the separation of church and state was a passion in Annonay and in its surroundings. There were expulsions of monks and nuns with the Querelle des inventaires particularly active during violent protests motivated by the fear of a return to the excesses of 1793–1794.

The First World War with its refugees, its wounded, its mutilated, and its dead (552 from Annonay) put an end to the protests.

The period between the two wars was marked by the presidential visit of Alexandre Millerand in 1923 on the occasion of the inauguration of the monument in honor of Marc Seguin and by the 150th anniversary of the first flight of the balloon (1933). The appearance of the city remained the same: dirty, dark streets, few new buildings like the "Vanaude" house. The "sunbelt" of castles contrast with the city center of slums and polluting industries. On the economic front mechanical industries grew: machines for the tannery of the Mercier brothers and especially for the manufacturing of buses. The old craft business of Jean-Joseph Besset became Renault then Irisbus, who manufacture its entire range of buses and coaches for France. These entrepreneurs invented the concept of the industrial zone. The descendants of the Montgolfier brothers, B. and E. de Canson invented tracing paper and photographic paper. Weaving experiencing strong growth.

During the Second World War Annonay was the site of the last battles of 1940. On 6 June 1944 the local resistance of the Secret Army were the first to liberate their own city. These facts earned the city the Croix de Guerre 1939–1945 and a citation at the order of the nation.

When peace returned, industrial sectors developed in Annonay such as food processing and pharmaceutical production. Other industries declined following the marginalisation of the work of leather and textile after great social conflict. The face of the city changed. From 1949 near the Besset factory a new district was created from scratch on farmland. It contains large housing subdivisions, schools, sports facilities and shops. Catholics built their fourth church in the city. Urbanization moved towards Boulieu-lès-Annonay, Roiffieux, and especially Davézieux with its industrial and commercial area. In the center, renovation of the old town, reconstruction of the banks of the Deume and the hillsides of Cance are scheduled. From a city with black façades, slums, and industrial wastelands, Annonay has become a colorful city made of new or rehabilitated buildings. The Deume has been covered for more than one kilometer and a new axis conveys traffic: the Avenue de l'Europe.

The Annonay people celebrated with great pomp the centenary of the railway line (1970), Marc Seguin (1975 and 1986), and the bicentennial of the first flight of the hot air balloon (1983).

=== The 21st century ===
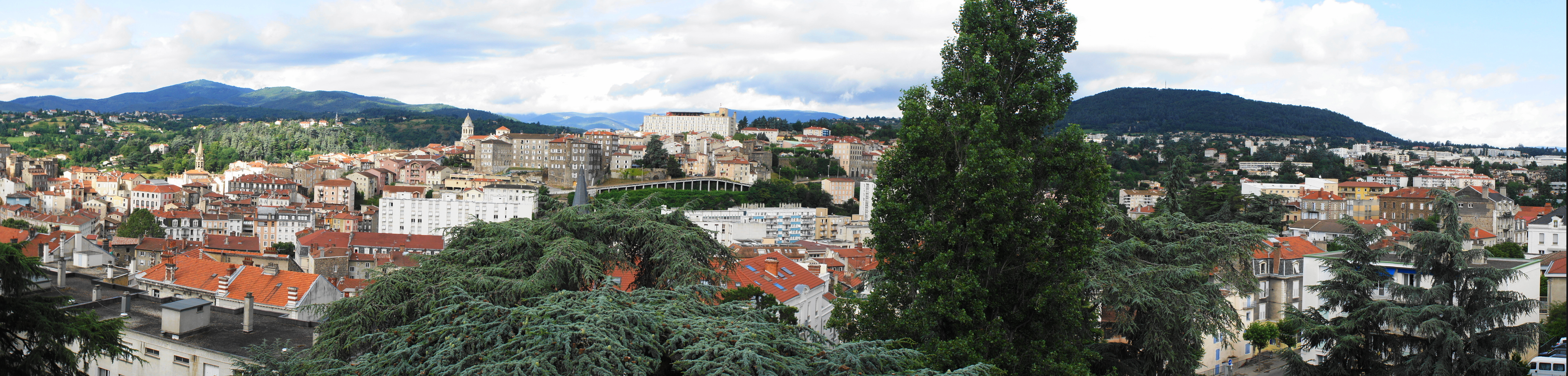
Panoramic view of Annonay

The city bore the brunt of deindustrialisation. Economic jewels disappeared causing job losses (industrial weaving, manufacture and paper production). At the same time new companies emerged bringing hope in the fields of food and cleaning equipment.

Although more discreet in a secular society religious life remains. The Catholic community created the parish of Sainte-Claire by merging the parishes of the city of Annonay, Roiffieux, Vocance, Villevocance, Vanosc, Saint-Julien-Vocance, Monestier, and the hamlet of Toissieu. The Protestant community is shared between the Evangelical Church and the United Protestant Church of France. The Muslim community built the House of the Orient, a building which includes the first mosque in Annonay.

On 8 March 2001, an ETA suspect was arrested at a local roadblock.

Associative and cultural life is rich. The people of Annonay celebrated the centennial of the opening of the new Church of Notre Dame (2012) and the establishment of the Joseph Besset factory (2013).

=== Heraldry ===
Arms of Annonay	The motto of Annonay is Cives et semper cives meaning "Citizens and always citizens" Blazon: Chequy of Or and Gules of 4 tires.

== Administration ==
List of Successive Mayors

Mayors from the French Revolution to 1942

From	To	Name	Party	Position
1790	1791	Gacou		
1791	1795	Gilbert Michel Colonjon		
1795	1797	Jean-Marie Desfrançois de Lolme		
1798	1799	Chabert		
1799	1802	Michel Marie Chapuis		
1802	1815	Jean-Marie Desfrançois de Lolme		
1815	1817	Mathieu Louis Pierre Duret		
1817	1823	Pierre François Lioud		
1823	1830	Louis Laurent Giraud		
1830	1848	Jean André Tavernier		
1848	1870	Etienne André Frachon		
1871	1874	Charles Chapuis		
1874	1878	Joseph Jean Lacaze		
1878	1880	François Auguste Riboulon		
1880	1882	Etienne Isidore Léon Adheran		
1882	1888	François Henry (called Franki) Kramer		
1894	1897	Marcellin Garnier		
1897	1901	Saturnin Alexandre Deaux		
1900	1904	Paul Eugène Geal		
1904	1919	Antoine Grimaud		
1919	1925	Lucien Bayle		
1925	1927	Léon Moirand		
1927	1935	Gustave Lapluye		
1935	1942	Gaston Duclos		

Mayors from 1942

From	To	Name	Party	Position
1942	1944	Pierre Lapize de Sallee		
1944	1944	Jacques Meaudres de Sugny	PCF	
1944	1950	Ferdinand Janvier	SFIO	Senior Executive
1950	1953	Joseph Pourret	SFIO	
1953	1959	Daniel Aime	SFIO	College Director
1959	1965	Fernand Duchier	CNIP	Industrialist
1965	1971	Daniel Aime	SFIO	Former College Director
1971	1977	Henri Faure	UDR	Industrialist
1977	1983	Jean Parizet	PS	Senior Executive
1983	1986	Régis Perbet	RPR	Director of Farm cooperative, MP 1980–1992
1986	1997	Claude Faure	RPR	Senior Executive
1997	2001	Jean-Claude Tournayre	PS	Architect
2001	2008	Gérard Weber	UMP	Physiotherapist, MP 2002–2007
2008	2017	Olivier Dussopt	PS	MP for Ardeche
2017	2020	Antoinette Scherer	PS	
2020	Current	Simon Plenet		

== Twin towns – sister cities ==
Annonay is twinned with:

- Backnang, Germany (1966)
- Barge, Italy (2001)
- Chelmsford, England, United Kingdom (1999)

Annonay also cooperates with Vysoké Mýto in the Czech Republic.

== Population ==
Historical population
Year	Pop.	±% p.a.
1968	20,757	—
1975	20,832	+0.05%
1982	19,484	−0.95%
1990	18,525	−0.63%
1999	17,522	−0.62%
2007	17,257	−0.19%
2012	15,983	−1.52%
2017	16,345	+0.45%
2023	17,274	+0.93%
Source: INSEE

=== Distribution of age groups ===
The age distribution of the population of the town is a younger then the average for the department.

Population by age of Annonay, 2023 (%)

80+	7.9
65–79	16.9
55–64	13.2
40–54	18
25–39	15.5
15–24	12
0–14	16.3

Total: 99.8

male

female

Source: INSEE

Population by age of Ardèche, 2023 (%)

90+	7.6
75–89	18.9
60–74	14.6
45–59	19.2
30–44	14.9
15–29	9.1
0–14	15.7

Total: 100

male

female

Source: INSEE

== Economy ==
Annonay has a strong industrial tradition, originally powered by the water flowing through the deep gorges around the town. In the 19th century, it was connected to the Paris-Lyon Railway and was famed for the best paper in France. It also produced glove leather and cotton, woolen, and silk goods. A modern dam was constructed across the Ternay, an affluent of the Deûme northwest of town, which expanded the power available to local factories. By the First World War, the leather industry had become predominant, while the economy expanded to include more raw silk, flour, chemical manures, glue, gelatine, brushes, chocolates, and candles. Although the leather industry has since declined, the Tannerie d'Annonay ("Annonay Tannery") continues the tradition under the Grison brand.

Irisbus (a Renault Vehicles Industries and Fiat Iveco joint venture) builds buses and is the largest single employer with around 2,000 staff with several associated businesses.

The multinational paper company Arjo Wiggins subsidiary Papeteries Canson et Montgolfier SA, which dates back to 1557 owns three of the several paper factories in the town.

Other industries in or close to the town include plastics, textiles, and pharmaceutical companies including Ciba, Aguettant and Tetra Médical.

There are a number of vineyards near the town.

The average salary in the area is 23,300 euro.

== Transport ==
=== Air ===
The nearest airport is Lyon–Saint-Exupéry Airport, which is located 89 km (55 mi) north east of Annonay.

== Culture and heritage ==
=== Civil heritage ===
==== The Montgolfier brothers ====
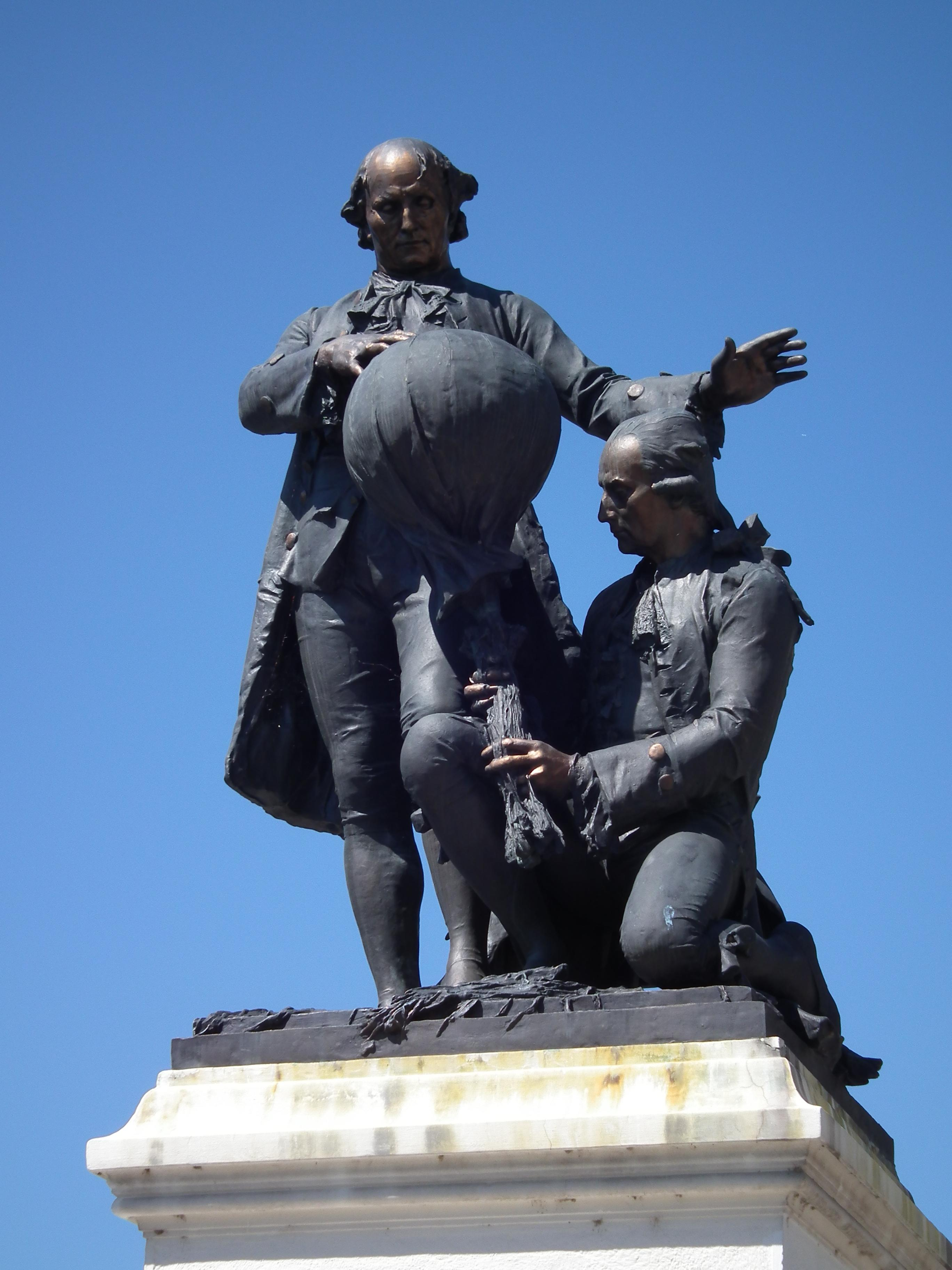
"The Montgolfier brothers"

- A Statue of the brothers Joseph and Etienne de Montgolfier located in the Place de Liberation. A work by the sculptor Henri Cordier, it was inaugurated on 5 June 1888.
- The Pyramid stone obelisk, the work of Étienne-François Imbard located on the Boulevard de la République. Built between 1819 and 1822, it commemorates the first ballooning experience of the Montgolfier brothers.
- The Montgolfier-Canson Paper Mill (18th century) is registered as an historical monument.

==== Marc Seguin ====
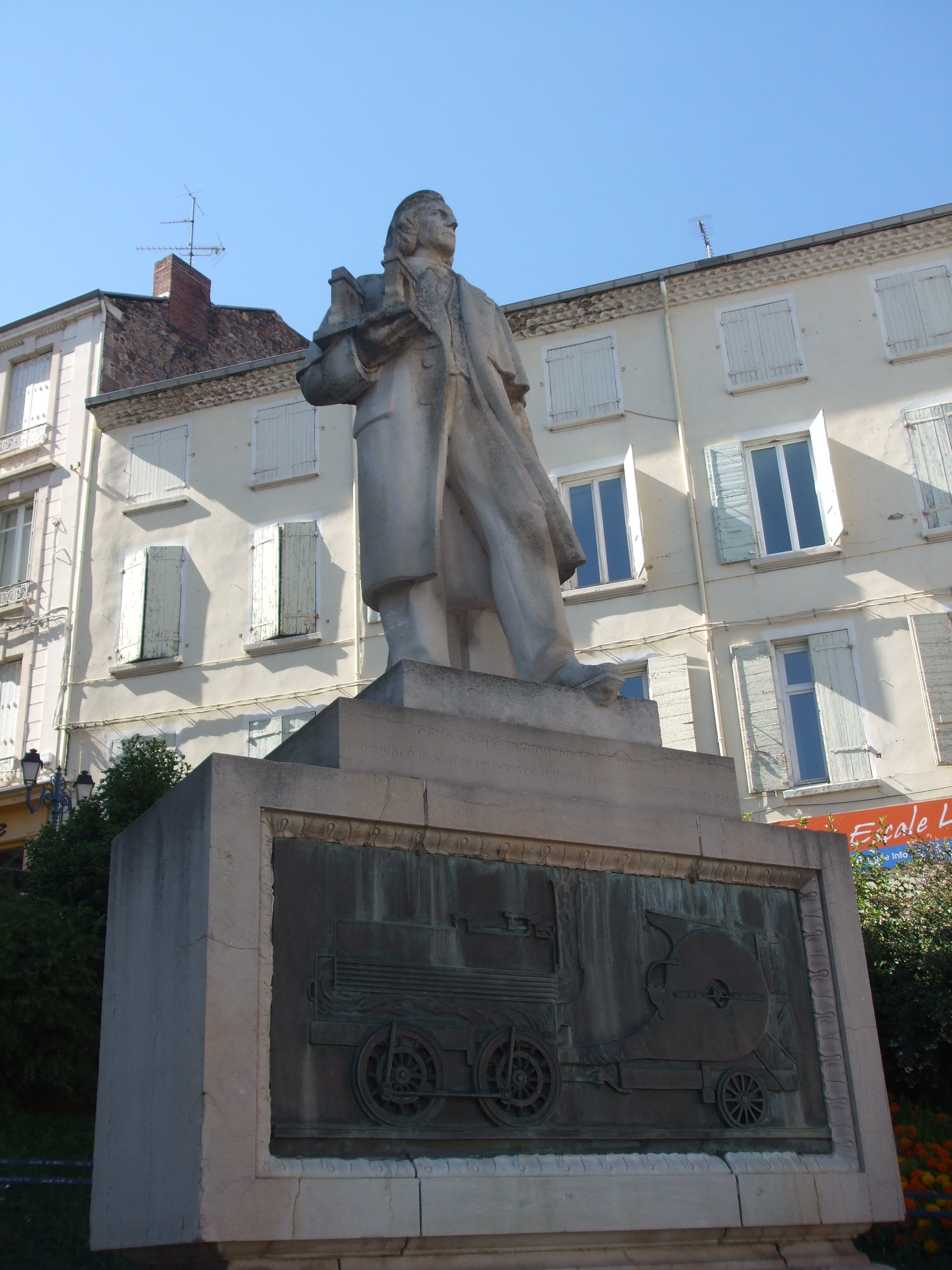
Statue of Marc Seguin

- A Monument to Marc Seguin, Place de la Liberté ( 1923 ). This bronze statue, the work of François Clémencin, was removed by the German army in 1942 then was replaced by a statue by the same sculptor which was inaugurated on 1 June 1947.
- The Domain of Marc Seguin at Varagnes (19th century) is registered as a historical monument.

==== Boissy d'Anglas ====
- A Statue of François-Antoine de Boissy d'Anglas located at the Champ de Mars. The work of the sculptor Pierre Hébert, it was inaugurated on 5 October 1862. The base is decorated with a bas-relief bronze (also the work of Pierre Hébert) representing the meeting on 1 Prairial Year III of the National Convention.
- A Painting: Boissy d'Anglas at the National Convention, 1 Prairial Year III, the work of Auguste Jean-Baptiste Vinchon, displayed in the wedding hall of the Town Hall.

==== Fountains ====
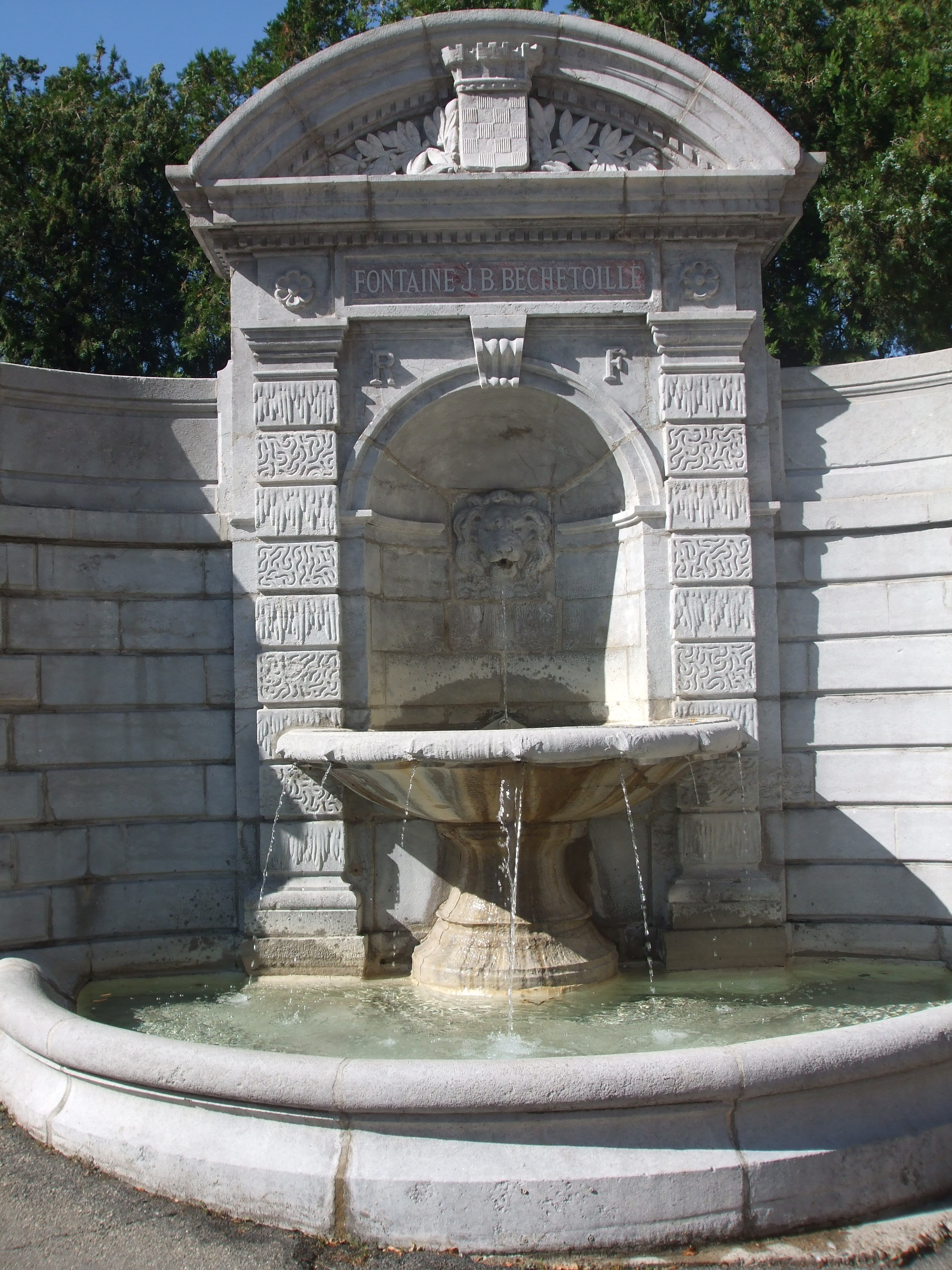
Jean-Baptiste Béchetoille fountain

- The Jean-Baptiste Béchetoille fountain (1900). The work of the architect Millefaud.
- The Fountain in the Place Grenette (1726).
- The Fountain in the Place de la Liberté opened in 1923.

==== Other sites of interest ====
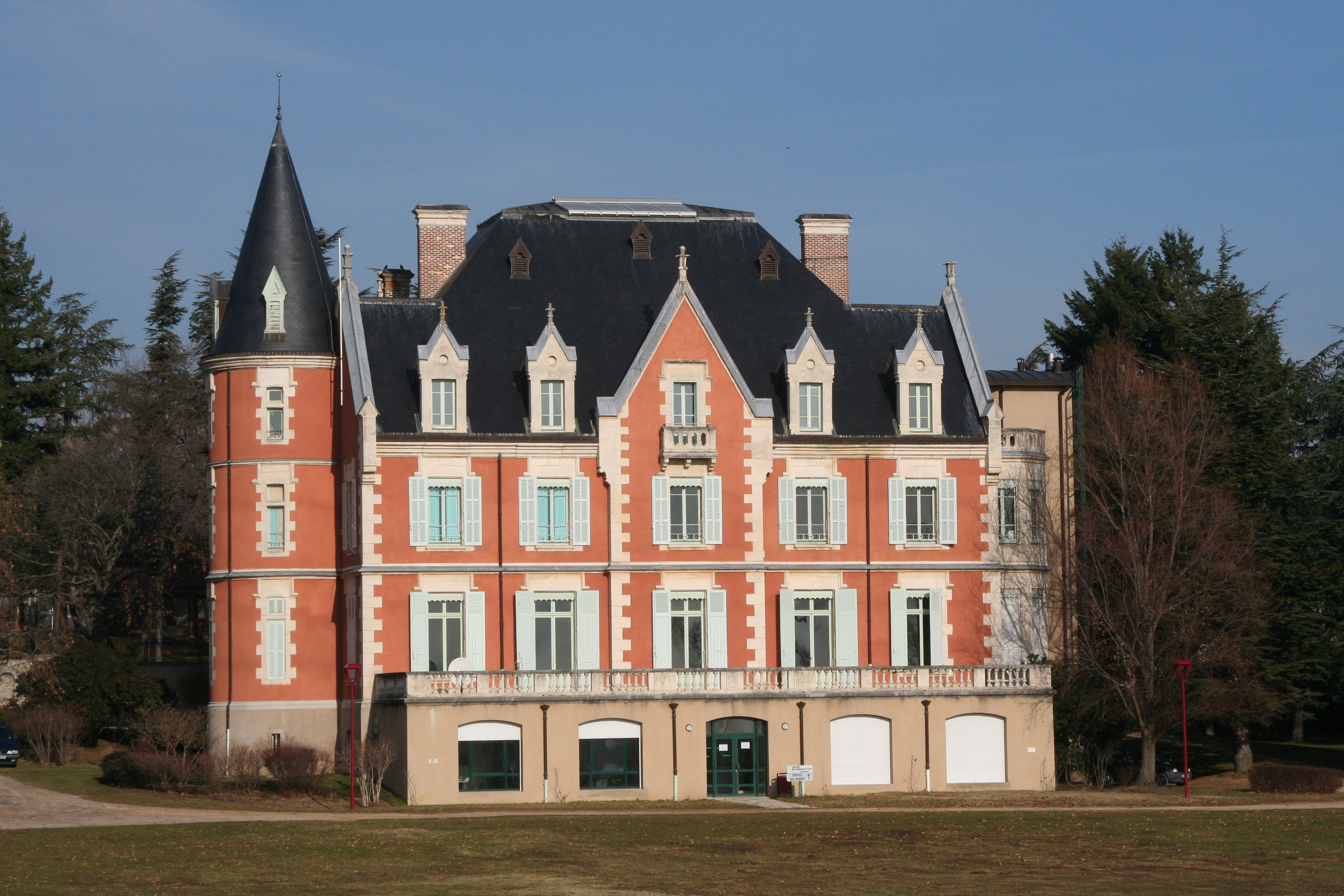
Château of Déomas.

- The City Hall of neoclassical inspiration (1835), rebuilt twice after fires (1870 and 1926).
- The Fortified house of Nicolas du Peloux in Rue de la Postern (Governor in 1577).
- Bourgeois mansions in Rue de Trachin from the 17th and 18th centuries.
- The Valgelas Bridge (14th century), a former city gate.
- The La Vanaude House at 33 Avenue Marc-Seguin (1930) is registered as an historical monument. It is the work of the architects Hugues Gosselin and Maurice Frappa.
- The César Filhol Museum in Rue Bechetoille (1700), formerly the royal bailiwick house. The museum contains two items that are registered as historical objects:
  - A Group Sculpture: Virgin of Pity (16th century)
  - A Statue: Christ (17th century) possibly by Veyrines.
- The Place Mayol (16th century) with a door of glazing beads.
- The Château of Déomas (1876) illustration of the "Sun Belt of Annonay".
- Substantial remains of the railway line between Firminy, Bourg-Argental, and Saint-Rambert-d'Albon:
  - Vidalon Tunnel, a passage on a ledge above the Deûme (covered in vegetation in 2013);
  - Retaining walls with characteristic stone-setting of the "Station district" (in the Place de la Gare in Annonay); Sacré-Cœur tunnel;
  - the Vissenty cutting.

=== Religious heritage ===
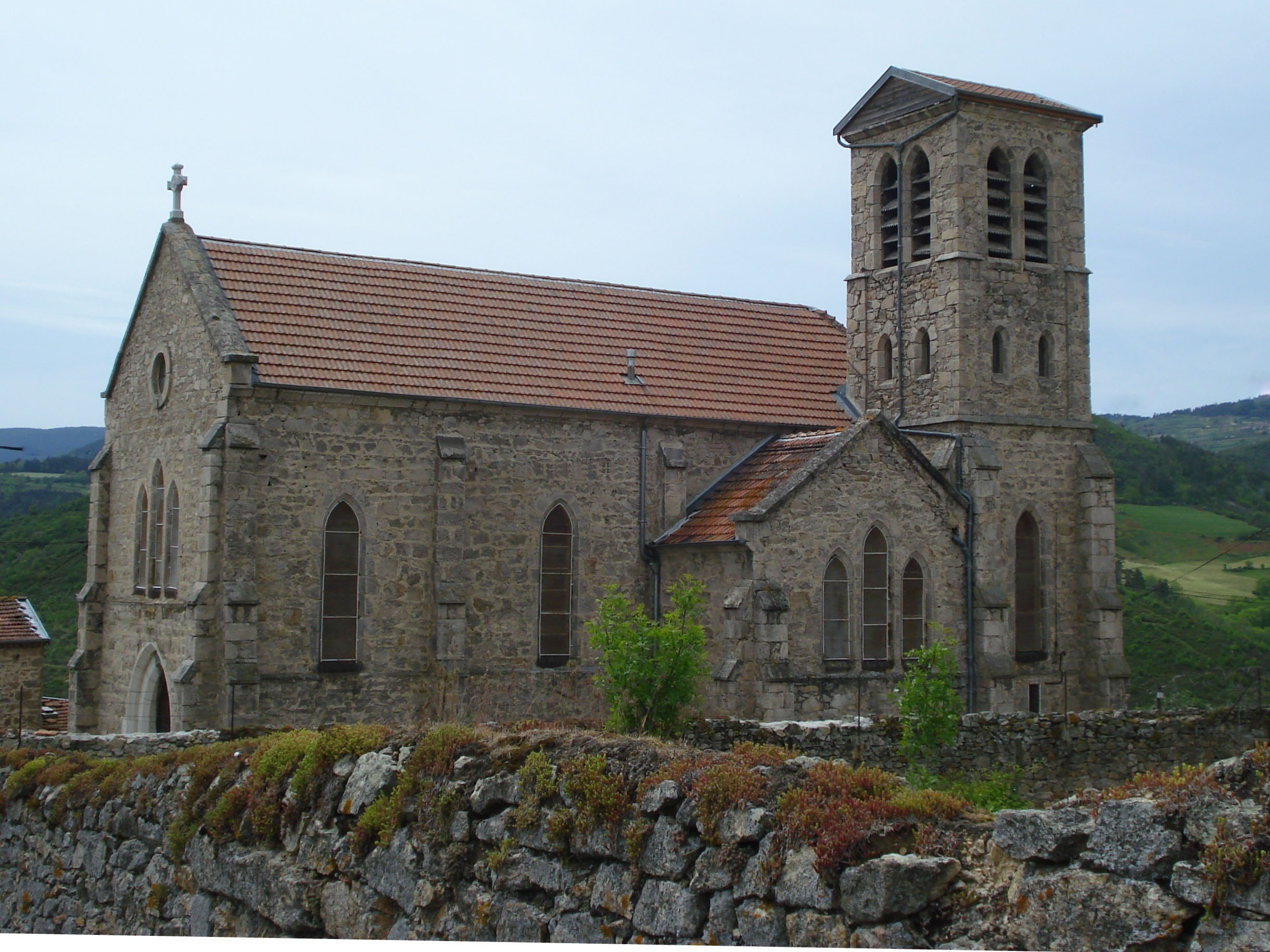
Church in the hamlet of Toissieu

- The Church Our Lady of the Assumption, in the neo-Byzantine Roman style, built between 1904 and 1912. Its bell tower contains a Carillon of five bells with a weight more than 2,100 kg (4,630 lb). It replaced a church of the same patronage located on the Place de la Liberté. The work of the architects Rey, Allengry, and Joly. Its interior decoration (paste paintings) is inspired by the Litanies of the Blessed Virgin, the Litany of Loreto, the Bible, hagiography, and the history of Annonay. Consecrated in 1954, it contains many items that are registered as historical objects:
  - 2 Statues: Adoring Angels (18th century)
  - A Statue: Virgin and child (18th century)
  - A Gallery Organ (1880) signed Cavaillé-Coll.
  - A Choir Organ (1848)
  - 2 Statues: Acolyte Angels (17th century)
  - 2 Statues: Cherubs (17th century)
  - A Bust-Reliquary: Saint John of the Cross (17th century)
  - A Bust-Reliquary: Saint Peter of Alcantara (17th century)
- The Church of Saint Francis of Assisi, in neo-Gothic style (1863–1866).
- The Church of Saint Joseph of Cance, in neo-Gothic style (1870–1872).
- The Church of the Holy Family of Perrières, in modern style (1957–1958).
- The Church of Saint Maurice of Toissieu, in neo-Gothic style (1876–1878).
- The Chapel of the Evangelical Free Church, Boulevard de la République (1900).
- The Temple of the Reformed Church, Rue Franki Kramer, portal from the 18th century.
- Orient House, Muslim cultural and religious center (2008–2013).
- The Chapel of the Hospital, dating from the 17th century. The chapel contains many items that are registered as historical objects:
  - A Sideboard (19th century)
  - 2 Apothecary Jars (19th century)
  - A Venetian Wall lamp mirror (18th century)
  - A Chest of Drawers with diamond corners (18th century)
  - A Painting: Christ on the Cross (17th century)
  - A Painting: The Martyrdom of Saint Sebastian (17th century)
  - A Painting with gold frame: Pope Clement VI (18th century)
  - A Painting with gold frame: Saint Jerome (17th century)
  - A Painting with gold frame: Adoration of the Trinity (17th century)
  - 24 Apothecary Jars (19th century)
  - A Mortar and pestle (1654)
  - A Mortar and pestle with chopping block (13th century)
- The Chapel of the Convent of Saint Mary (1633) is registered as an historical monument. The convent was built on the foundations of a castle called Malatour in 1630 with the Chapel built later in 1633. The chapel contains several items that are registered as historical objects:
  - A Triptyche: 3 paintings of the life of Saint Francis Regis (1888)
  - A Retable (17th century)
  - A framed Painting: Raphael Sara and Tobie (17th century)
  - Wood panelling and Paintings (17th century)

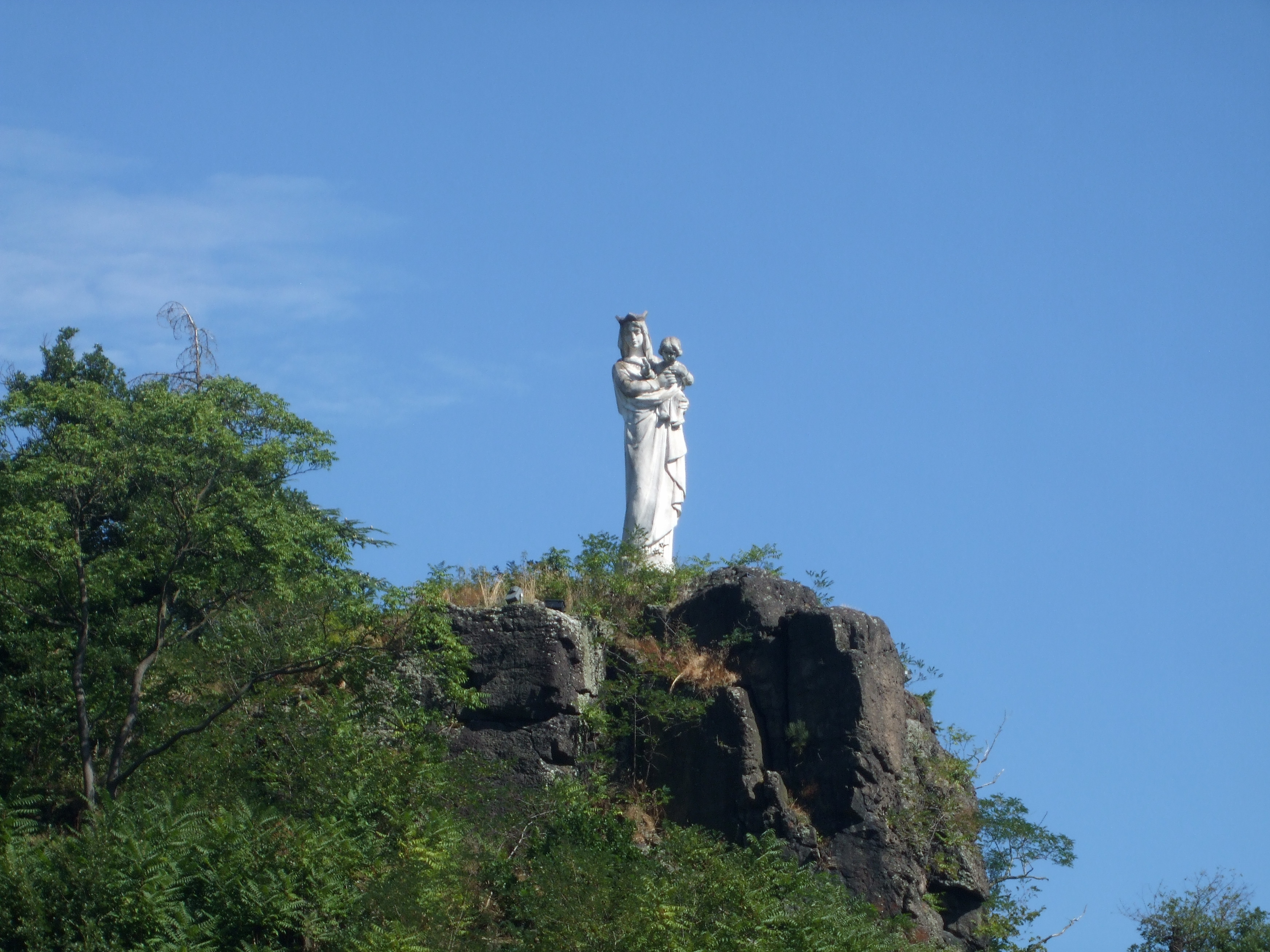
Madonna on the Saint-Denis rocks

- The Vierge des Fouines Statue (Nosy Virgin Statue) or Our Lady of Faith Statue placed on the rocks of Saint-Denis. 5.22 metres tall and the work of Bachini from Lyon. It was blessed on 26 September 1943.
- The Chapel of Trachin or Trachi is in Gothic style with an octagonal bell tower, with remains of a priory dating from 1320. The chapel contains several items that are registered as historical objects:
  - A Decorative ceiling painting (19th century)
  - A Bust of Saint François-de-Sales (17th century)
  - A Painting: the Nativity of the Virgin (18th century)
  - A Painting: Saints Jacques and Philippe (1658)
  - A Statue: Virgin and child (18th century)
- The Chapel of Vidalon-les-Annonay contains a Gallery Organ (1818) that is registered as an historical object.
- The former Chapel of Saint-Clair in Rue Sadi Carnot (14th century) is registered as an historical monument. It was built in Gothic style from 1348 to 1356.
- The Cemetery chapel at Toissieu.

=== Military Heritage ===
- The War Memorial (1914–1918, 1939–1945, and subsequent wars). Designed by architect Maurice Luquet, the statues The pensive soldier and The Stricken Woman were sculpted by Paul Landowski. It was inaugurated on 25 June 1922.
- The Monument of Mobiles (1907) at the cemetery. Designed by architect Theodore Joly and sculptor Aimé Millet.
- An Old door from the castle dating from the 12th century.
- The Soubises Vaults, remnants of the walls with a covered path around (12th–13th centuries).
- The Tower of Martyrs, from the 12th century, the remains of the ramparts of the city, this tower is located above the Deume. It is said that the condemned were thrown to their death in the shallow river. It is also believed that the name may come from the Martins ford which it defended.

=== Cultural heritage ===
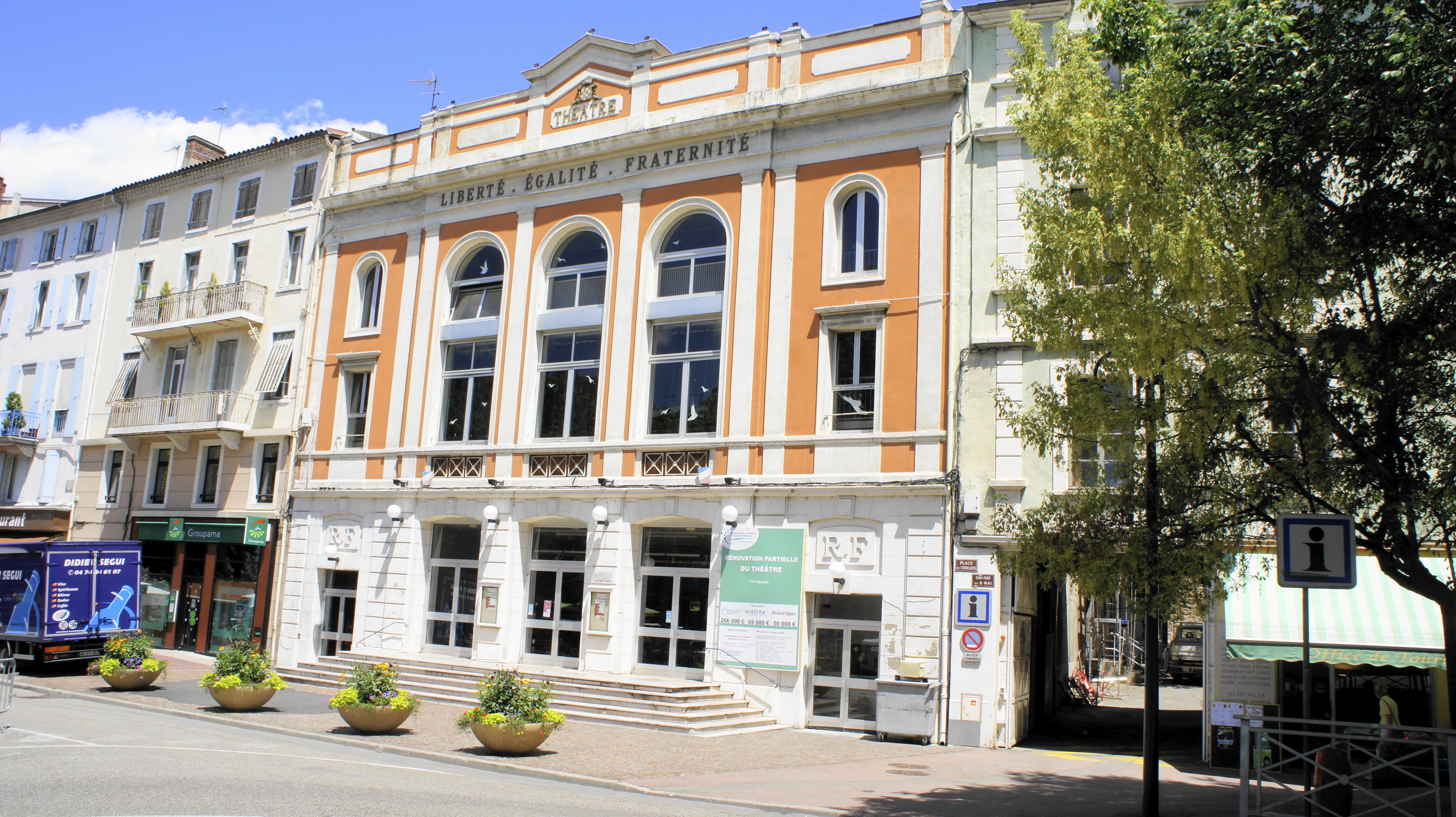
Facade of the Bassin d'Annonay theatre

- The "Italian" Theatre (1887), in the Place des Cordeliers, built on the site of the chapel of the former Franciscan convent.

== Notable people ==
- François Antoine de Boissy d'Anglas (1756–1826), writer, lawyer and politician
- Pierre Bertrand (1280–1349), cardinal, theologian, and canonis
- Joseph-Michel (1740–1810) and Jacques-Étienne Montgolfier (1745–1799), aviation pioneers, balloonists and paper manufacturers
- André Joseph Abrial (1750–1826), politician and Minister of Justice
- The Monneron brothers, founders of the Monneron Bank (1791–1792): Paul Mérault Monneron, Chief Engineer of the La Perouse expedition, Joseph François Augustin Monneron, Pierre Antoine Monneron, Louis Monneron, and Charles Claude Ange Monneron.
- Marc Seguin (1786–1875), engineer, inventor of the wire-cable suspension bridge and the fire-tube boiler
- Auguste Bravais (1811–1863), physicist
- François Joseph Clozel (1860–1918), governor of French West Africa
- Joseph Canteloube (1879–1957), composer, musicologist and author
- Maurice Grimaud (1913–2009), police chief of Paris during the May 68
- Fred (1924–2019) and René Mella (1926–2019), tenors of Les Compagnons de la chanson
- Roger Dumas (1932–2016) actor
- Olivier Dussopt (born 1978), politician
- Clément Grenier (born 1991), footballer

== Culture ==
- Archives: Parish and Civil Records, genealogical analysis, municipal Proceedings
- Museum of the Canson & Montgolfier paper-makers: traces the history of the cottage industry of paper. It is the only museum to present a large working paper machine.
- Vivarois Municipal Museum César Filhol: presents local ethnology, collections, and traces the history of local inventions by the Montgolfiers and Seguins.
- Occitan culture still holds a significant place
- Jean-Pierre Mocky used the town as the setting for his film Litan (1982).
- The 2003 part-British funded movie L'homme du train (The Man on the Train) was filmed in Annonay.

== Culinary specialities ==
- Angel wings (Bugnes)
- Pantins
- Pogne of Annonay

== Local press ==
The regional newspaper Le Dauphiné Libéré is available in Annonay. It also hosts the headquarters of the weekly Le Reveil du Vivarais. Another weekly L'Hebdo de l'Ardèche also covers the territory. Since the early 2000s a free monthly made its appearance, L'Indispensable is distributed among traders in the Annonay basin. It informs readers about cultural events taking place around the region.

== Festivals ==
Each year

- In February:
  - The Premier International Festival of Film
- In June:
  - The Festival of Hot air Ballooning (1st weekend).
  - The Festi'roc 07, a Christian modern music festival, it is organized by the Catholic parishes of the Annonay Basin.
- In November:
  - The Love of good food of Ardèche and Upper Vivarais, (3rd weekend). This is organized by the association of the same name. During a weekend, the Place des Cordeliers becomes a showcase of Ardèche products. Sixty exhibitors and many activities punctuate this event.
- The Championship of France for Hot air Ballooning

== Gallery ==
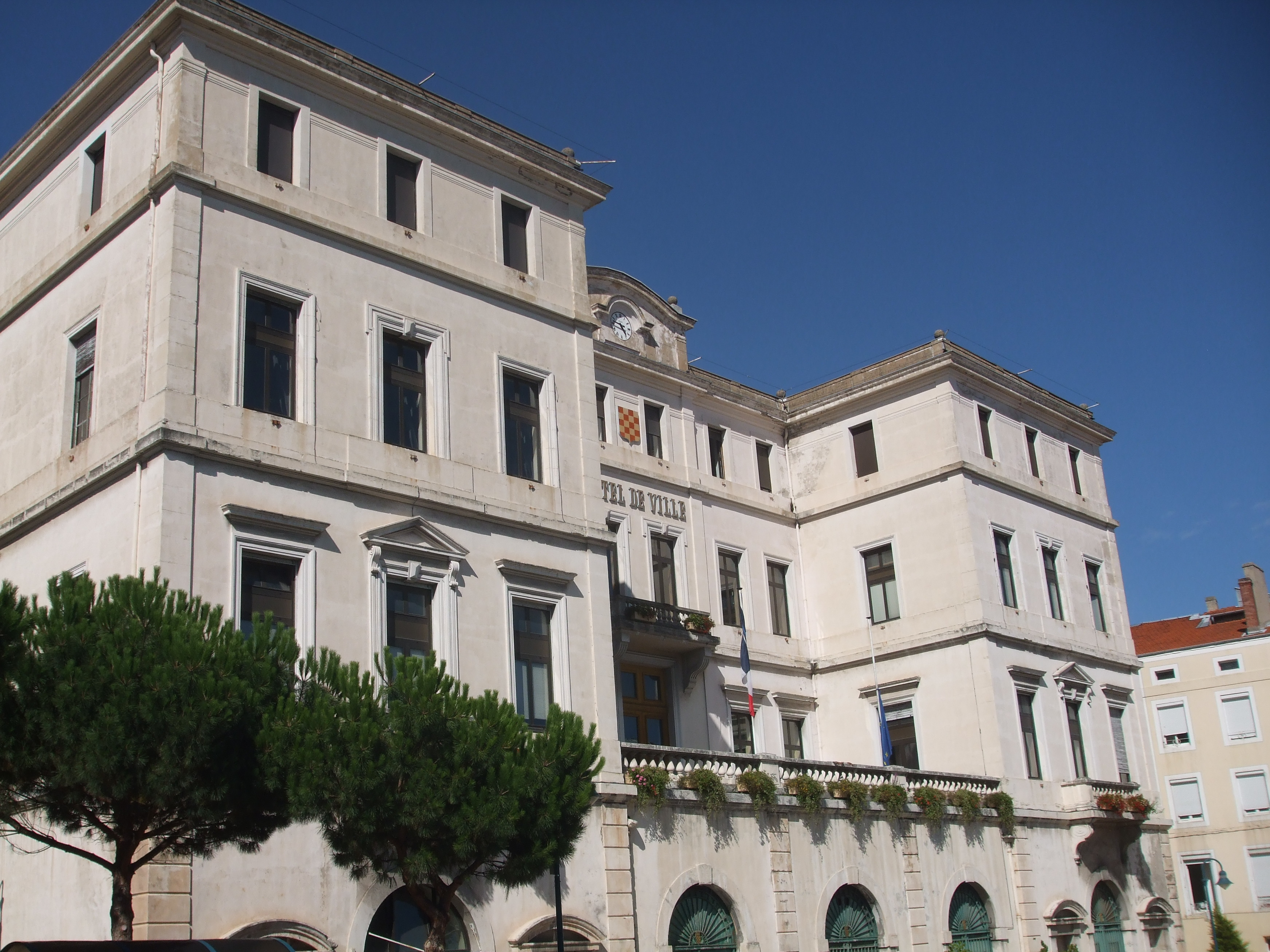
City hall

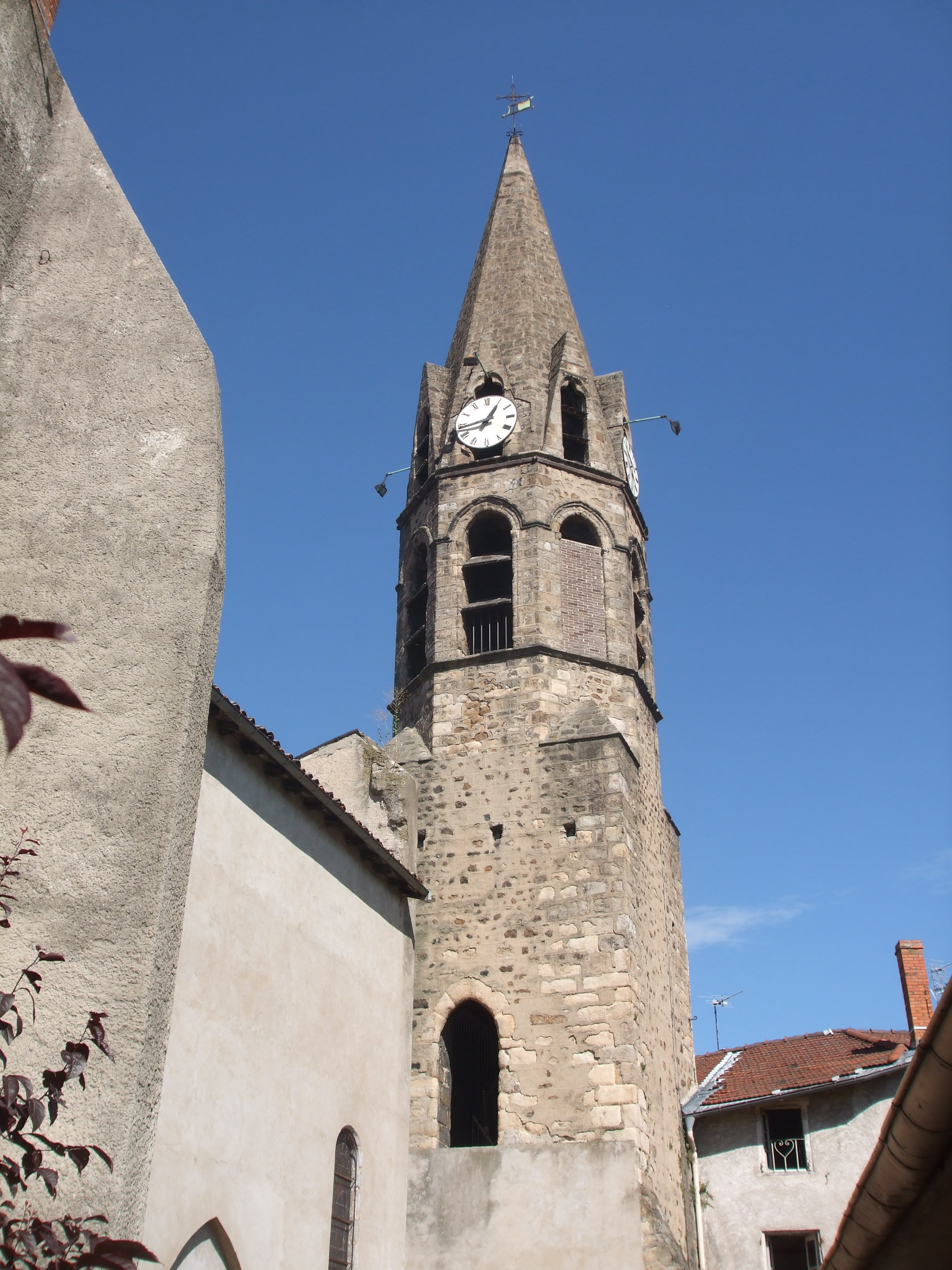
Bell Tower of the Chapel of Trachin

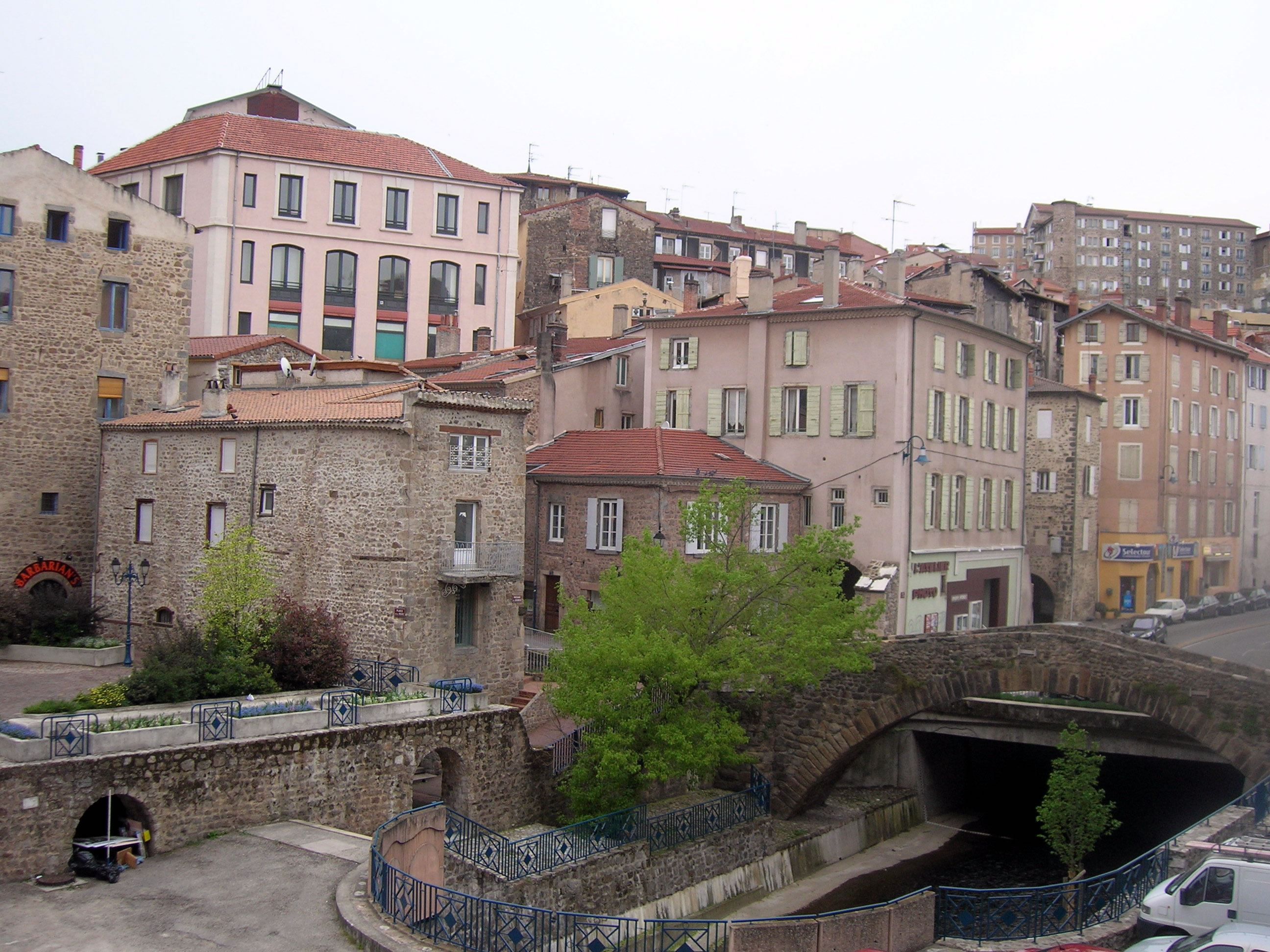
The Valgelas Bridge near the Soubises Vaults and the Place de la Mure

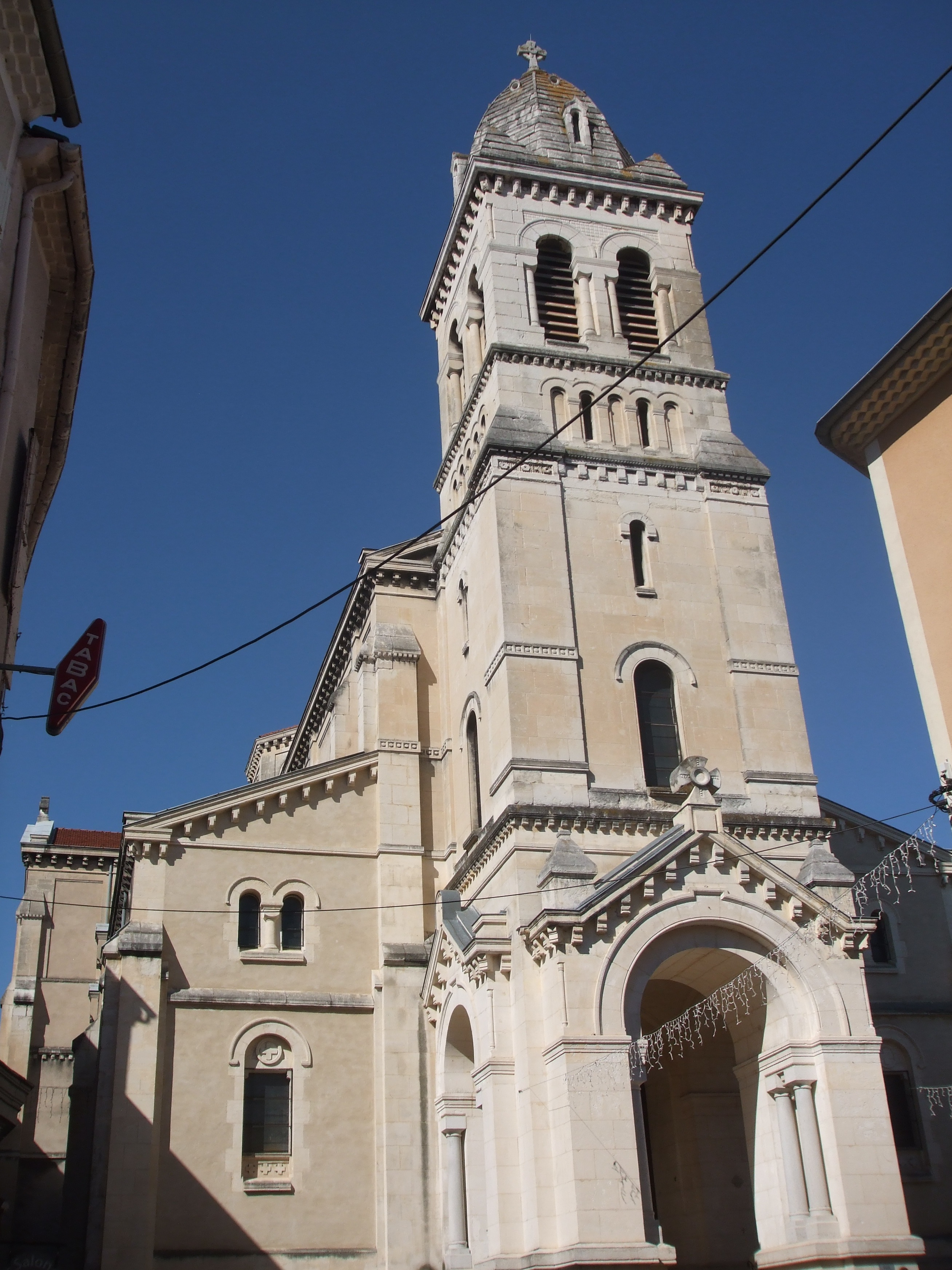
Church of Our Lady

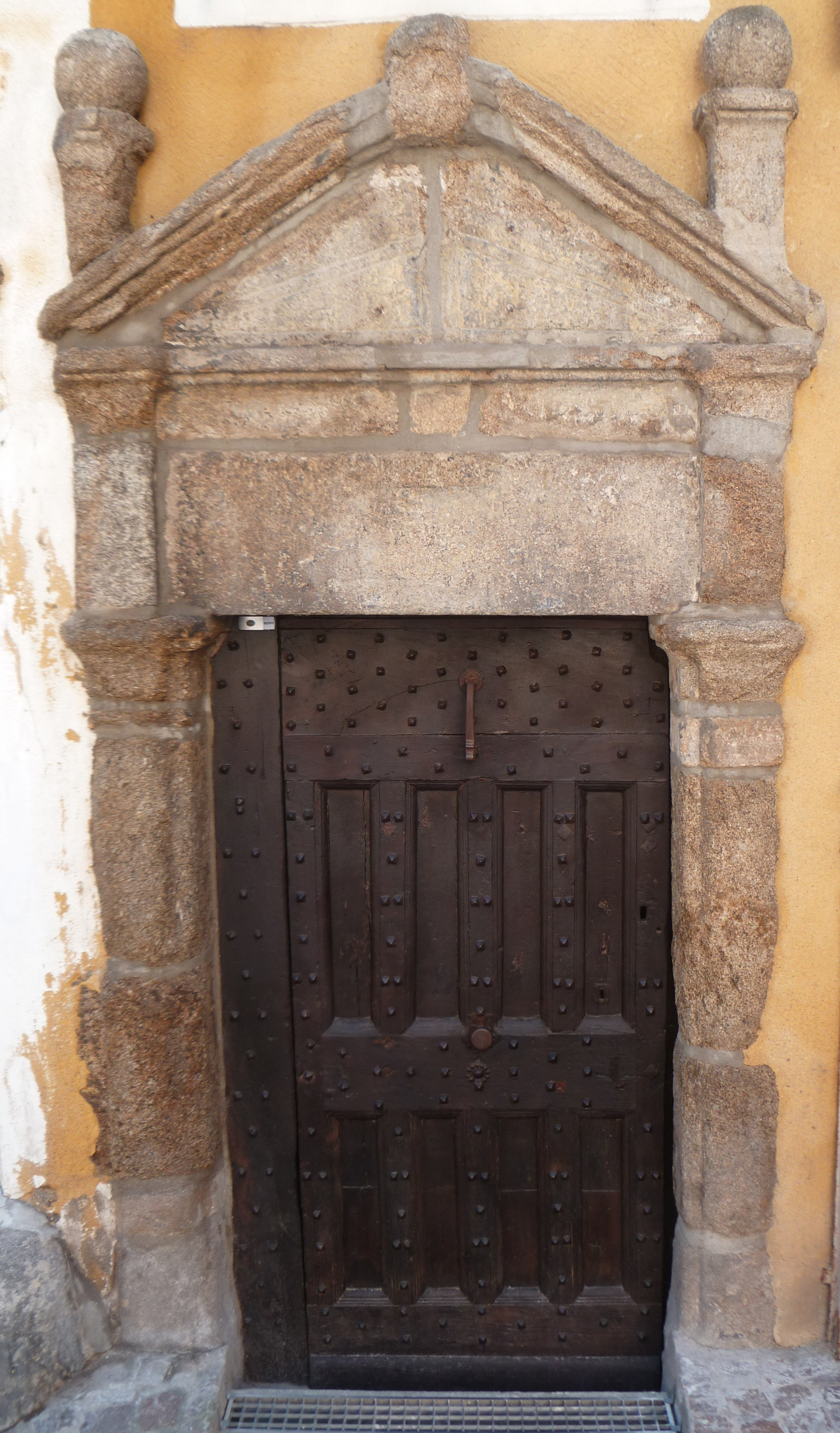
Old door in the Place Grenette (16th century)

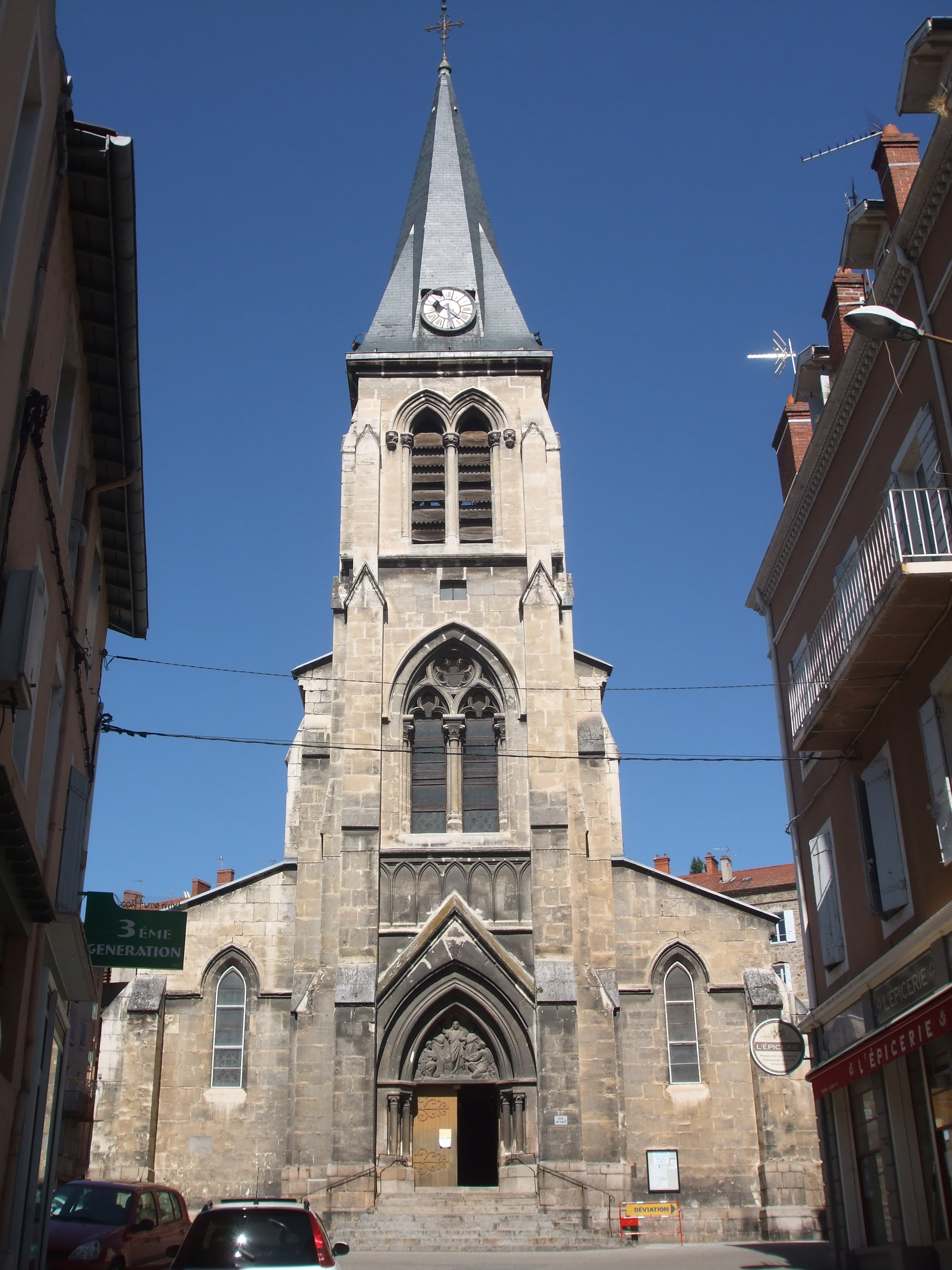
Church of Saint Francis

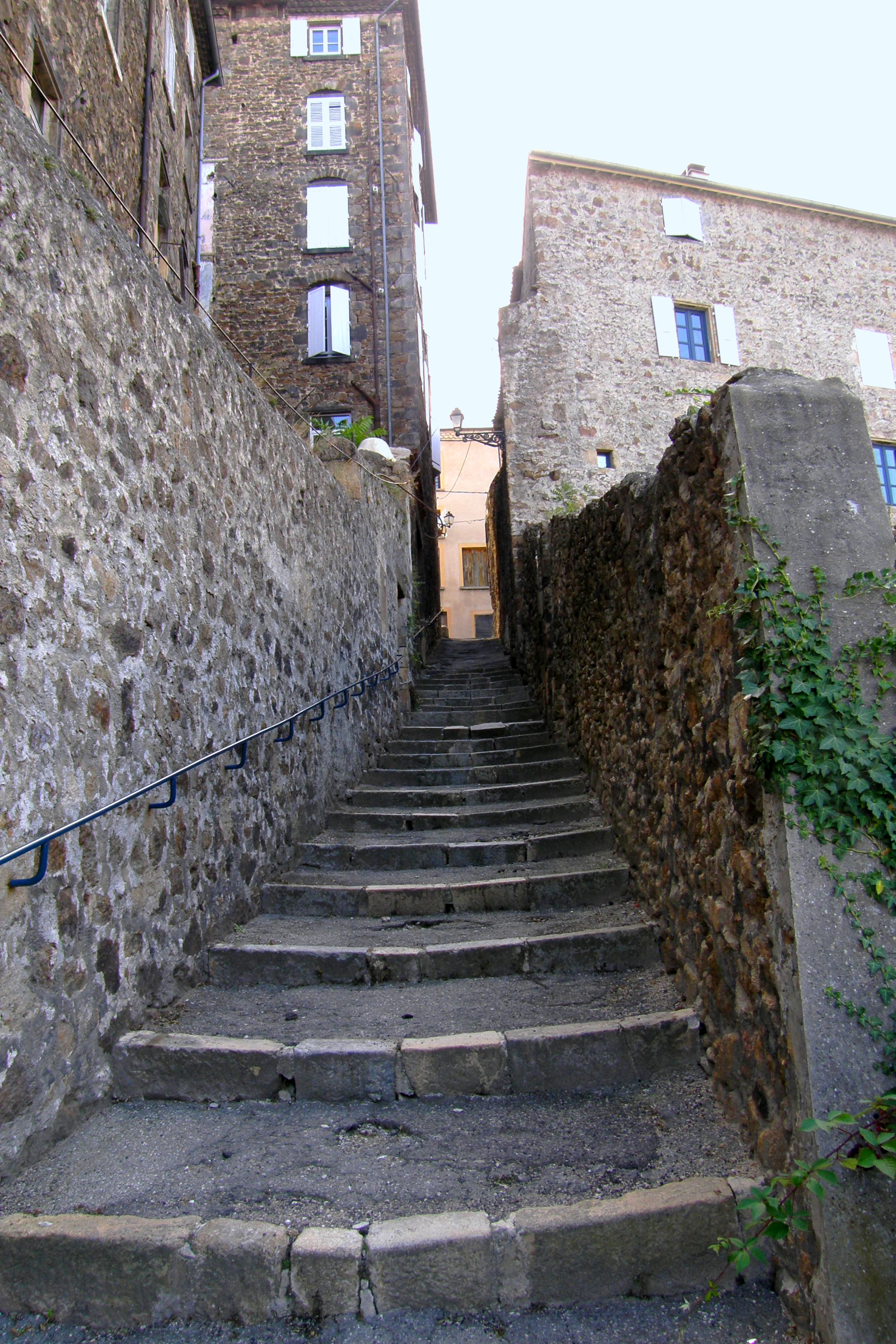
Chemin des Terres

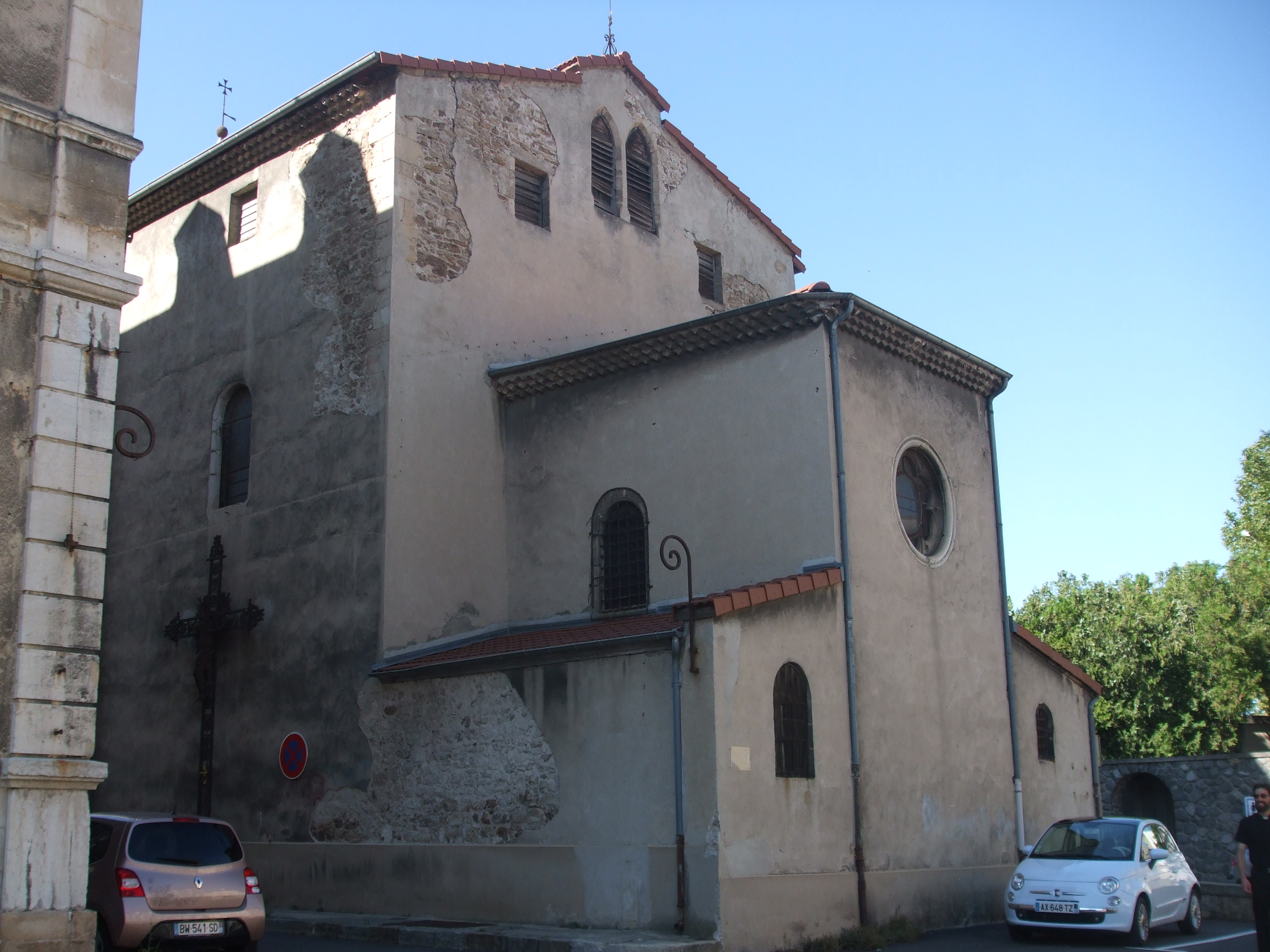
Chapel of the hospital (18th century)

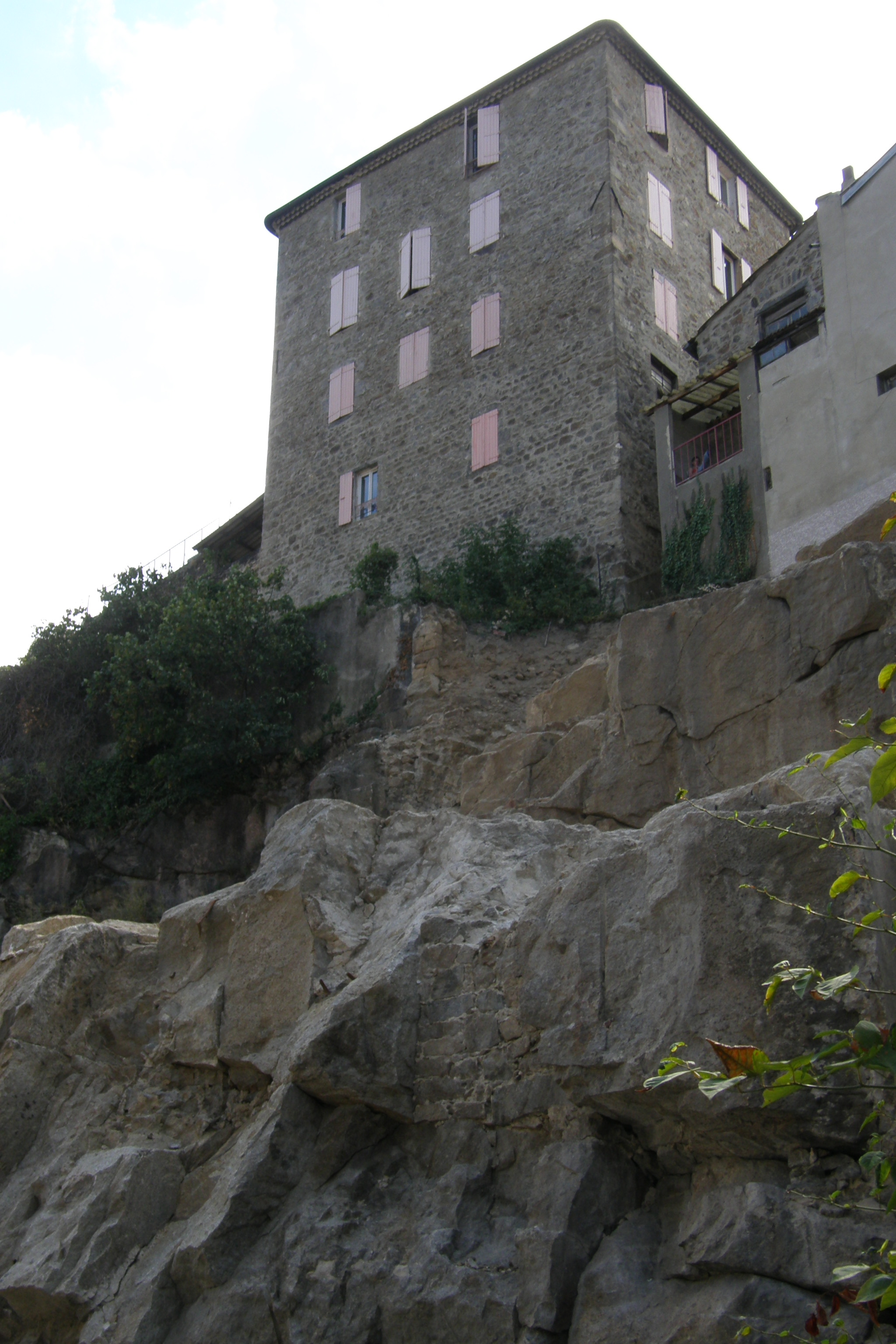
"Sainte-Barbe" House

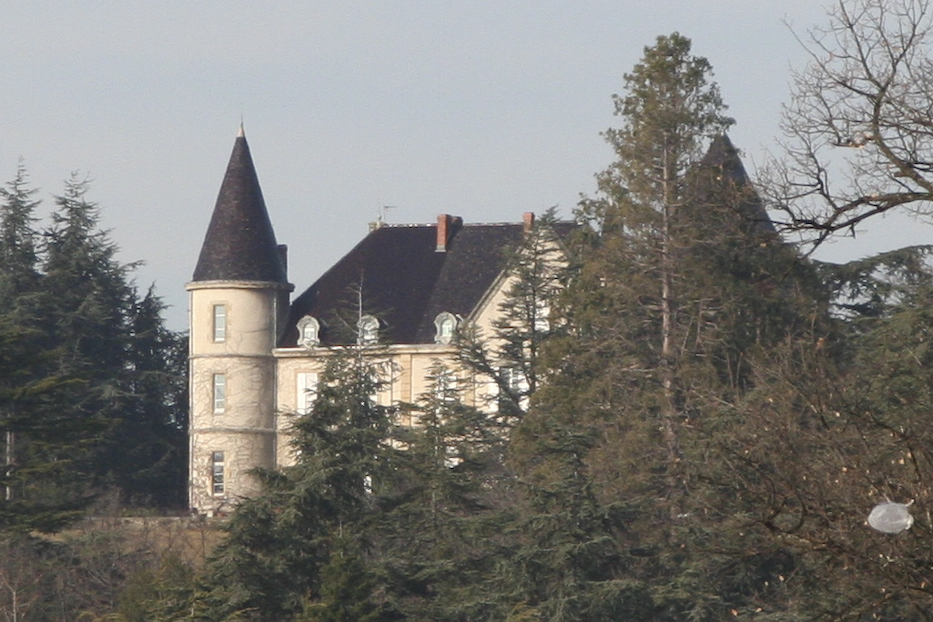
An overview of Mirecouly Castle, illustration of the "Sun belt"

== Historical bibliography ==
(in French)

- François Chomel, Annonay pas à pas, pierre à pierre, Édition du Vivarais, Annonay, 1995, 250 p.
- Pierre Fanget, Annonay ma ville, Annonay, 1971.
- Abbé Filhol, Histoire religieuse et civile d'Annonay et du Haut–Vivarais depuis l'origine de cette ville jusqu'à nos jours, Tomes 1, 2, 3 et 4, Moussy ainé, 1882.
- Emmanuelle Faure, Claude Osset, Annonay, Mémoire en images, Éditions Alan Sutton, Saint-Cyr-sur-Loire, 127 pages, 2004.
- Emmanuelle Faure, Bernard Faure, Claude Osset, Annonay en Fêtes, 1860–2000, Jean Pierre Huguet Editeur, Saint-Julien-Molin-Molette, 2002, 283 p.
- La Gazette d'Annonay, Hebdomadaire local paraissant entre 1889 et 1944.
- Antoine Grimaud, Annonay, la vie municipale de 1870 à 1920, Imprimerie Hervé, Annonay, 1926, 540 p.
- Gaston Grimaud, Mon vieil Annonay, Decombe frères, Annonay, 1948, 48 p.
- Le Journal d'Annonay, Hebdomadaire local paraissant entre 1865 et 1944.
- Abbé Léorat Picansel, Annonay pendant la Terreur, Tomes 1 et 2, Amis du Fonds Vivarois, 1988.
- Rémy Bernard, Histoire d'Annonay et sa région, Horvath, Roanne, 1981, 149 p.
- Le Réveil du Vivarais et de la vallée du Rhône, Hebdomadaire local paraissant depuis 1944.

== See also ==
- Communes of the Ardèche department
- History
  - Parlement of Toulouse
  - Languedoc
  - Estates of Languedoc
  - Vivarais
  - Pays d'états
