= Paul Mérault Monneron =

Paul Mérault Monneron or de Monneron (23 February 1748, Annonay, Ardèche – May 1788, Vanikoro) was an engineer officer in the French armed forces and from 1785 to 1788 a member of Lapérouse's expedition.

== Family ==
His eldest brother Charles Claude Ange Monneron was député to the Estates General of 1789, for the Sénéchaussée of Annonay, his brothers Louis Monneron (1742–1805) and Pierre Antoine Monneron (1747–1801) were respectively députés of the National Constituent Assembly for the West Indies and Mauritius. Another brother, Joseph François Augustin Monneron (1756–1826) was député for Paris at the Legislative Assembly and retired from it in 1792, before becoming Director General of the Caisse des Comptes Courants and going bankrupt in 1798.

== Life ==
Entering the École du génie de Mézières and received as an engineer on 1 January 1770, he was first employed in France, at Briançon then Saint-Omer.

=== Participation in Lapérouse's expedition ===
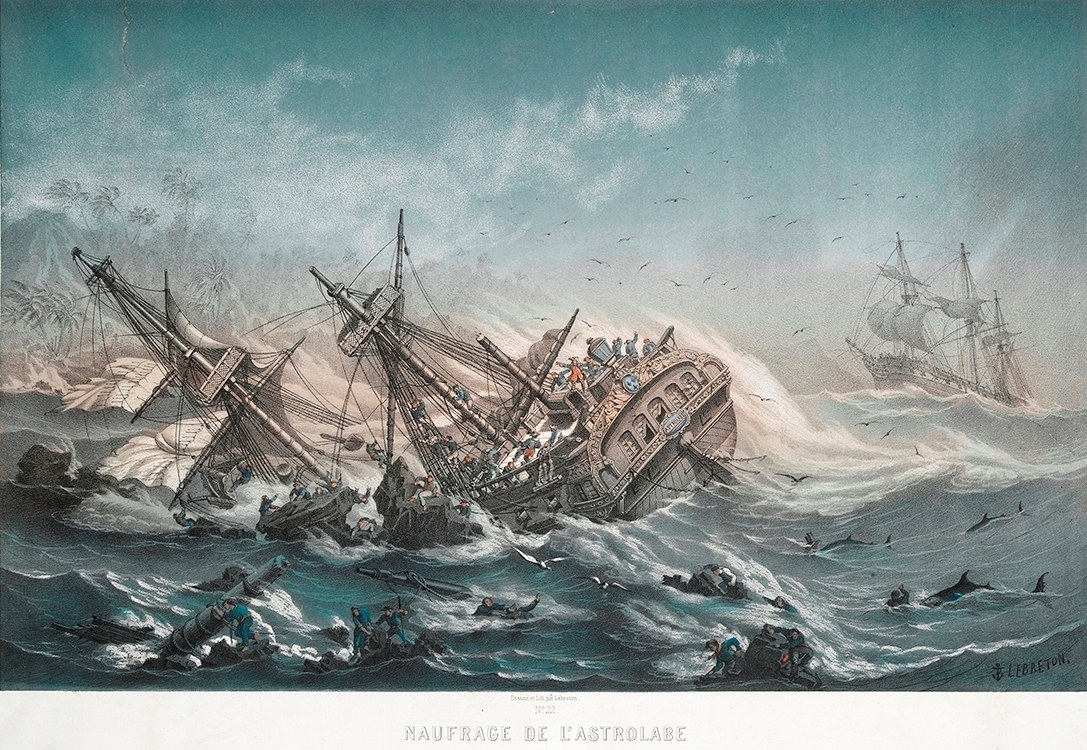
The shipwreck of the Astrolabe, Vanikoro, 1788

Lapérouse proposed Monneron to Fleurieu as the expedition's chief engineer, for "such a character joined to knowledge is that which convened in him".

Moneron Island, discovered by the expedition west of Sakhalin Island, was named after him.

He died in the shipwreck of the Astrolabe at Vanikoro in 1788.

== See also ==
- European and American voyages of scientific exploration

== Sources ==
- His genealogy on geneanet samlap

== Bibliography ==
- L'expédition de Lapérouse 1785–1788 Réplique Française aux voyages de Cook – C.Gaziello Paris 1984
