= André Joseph Abrial =

French politician

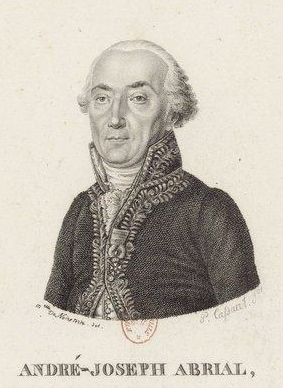
André Joseph Abrial

André-Joseph, comte Abrial (19 March 1750 – 13 November 1828) was a French jurist and politician who served as Keeper of the Seals and Minister of Justice from 1799 to 1802.

Born in Annonay, Abrial trained as a lawyer, though he suffered from a stutter which made his practice difficult. After the Coup of 18 Brumaire, Napoleon appointed him Keeper of the Seals and Minister of Justice, telling him "It is not me, it is the public voice that nominates you." As minister, he reorganized the judicial system, took part in the development and implementation of the Napoleonic Code, in France and abroad. He was appointed to the Sénat conservateur in 1802.

== Biography ==
He was born on March 19, 1750, in Annonay. He was the Only child of Jean Pierre Abrial, a master surgeon, and Marie Christine Murol, whose family held an honorable position in society.

Several members of the Abrial family held important public offices under the consular and imperial governments.One of his close relatives was appointed government Trial court of first instance in Le Puy (May 18, 1800) and another (May 24, 1800) to the court in Lavaur, Tarn; a third, Barthélémy Abrial, Vicar general of the diocese of Le Puy, was sworn in as such on May 14, 1802, in accordance with the Concordat of 1801.

== Honors and awards ==
- Grand Officer of the Order of Legion of Honour (1804)
- Grand Cross of the Order of the Reunion (1813)
