= Joseph François Augustin Monneron =

French politician and banker

Joseph François Augustin Monneron (24 December 1756, Annonay, Ardèche – 13 August 1826, New Orleans) was a French banker and politician, as well as an active merchant in New Orleans seeking to reestablish French influence there after the Louisiana Purchase. He was deputy for Paris to the Legislative Assembly in 1791 until retiring from it in 1792. His brothers Louis Monneron (1742–1805) and Pierre Antoine Monneron (1747–1801) were deputies to the Estates General of 1789 for the East Indies and Mauritius respectively. Other brothers were the deputy Charles Claude Ange Monneron and the engineer Paul Mérault Monneron.
