= Charles Claude Ange Monneron =

French politician (1735–1799)

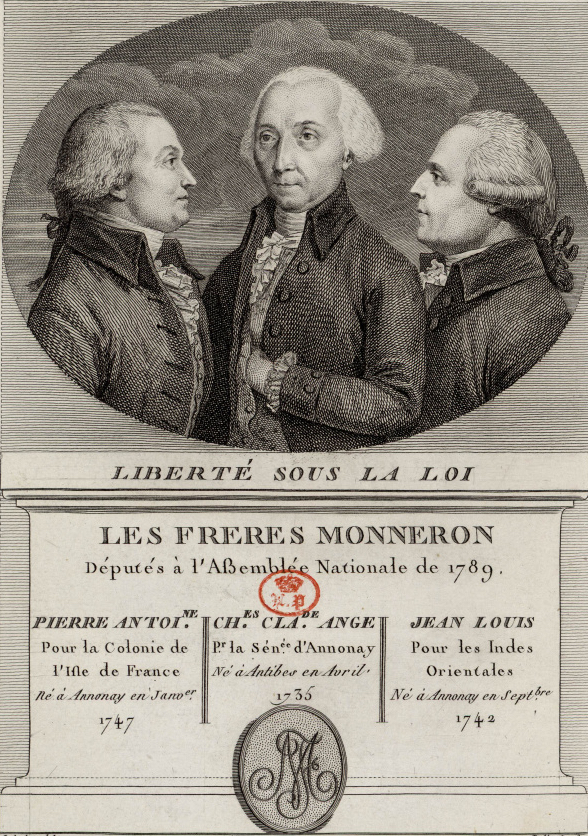
The Monneron brothers. Left to right : Pierre-Antoine (1747–1811), Charles-Claude-Ange (1735–1804), Jean-Louis (1742–1805).

Charles Claude Ange Monneron (5 April 1735, in Antibes, Alpes-Maritimes – 30 May 1799, in Annonay) was a French businessman, banker and politician. He held the position of intendant général of Pondichéry (making a fortune with the French East India Company).

Additionally, he served as a député to the Estates General of 1789 and then to the National Constituent Assembly.

== Family ==
His brother Paul Mérault Monneron was an engineer, and his other brothers Louis Monneron (1742–1805) and Pierre Antoine Monneron (1747–1801) were respectively députés of the National Constituent Assembly for the East Indies and Mauritius. Another brother, Joseph François Augustin Monneron (1756–1826) was député for Paris at the Legislative Assembly and retired from it in 1792, before becoming Director General of the Caisse des Comptes Courants.
