= Louis Monneron =

French politician (1742–1805)

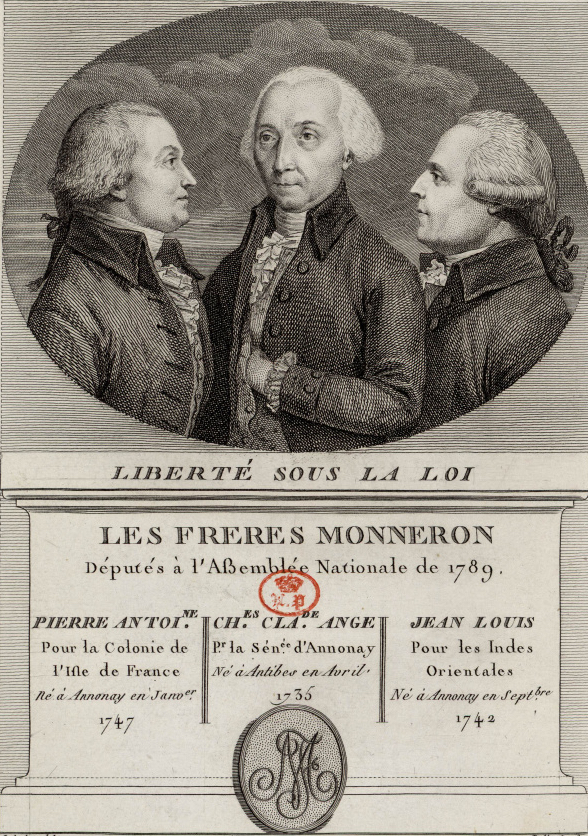
The Monneron brothers. Left to right : Pierre-Antoine (1747–1811), Charles-Claude-Ange (1735–1804), Jean-Louis (1742–1805).

Jean Louis Monneron (12 September 1742, Annonay, Ardèche – 30 November 1805, Senegal), known as Monneron des Mortiers or Mortars Monneron, was a French businessman, arms supplier and politician. He supplied arms to Mauritius, becoming so rich he could advance large sums to the Spanish government. He was a member of the Amis Réunis de Pondichéry (1771) and député of the National Constituent Assembly for the East Indies.

== Family ==
One brother, Pierre Antoine Monneron (1747–1801), was deputy to the National Constituent Assembly for Mauritius, whilst another - Joseph François Augustin Monneron (1756–1826) - was deputy for Paris to the Legislative Assembly, later becoming director general of the Caisse des Comptes Courants. Two other brothers were the engineer Paul Mérault Monneron and the deputy Charles Claude Ange Monneron.
