= Villevocance =

- Commune
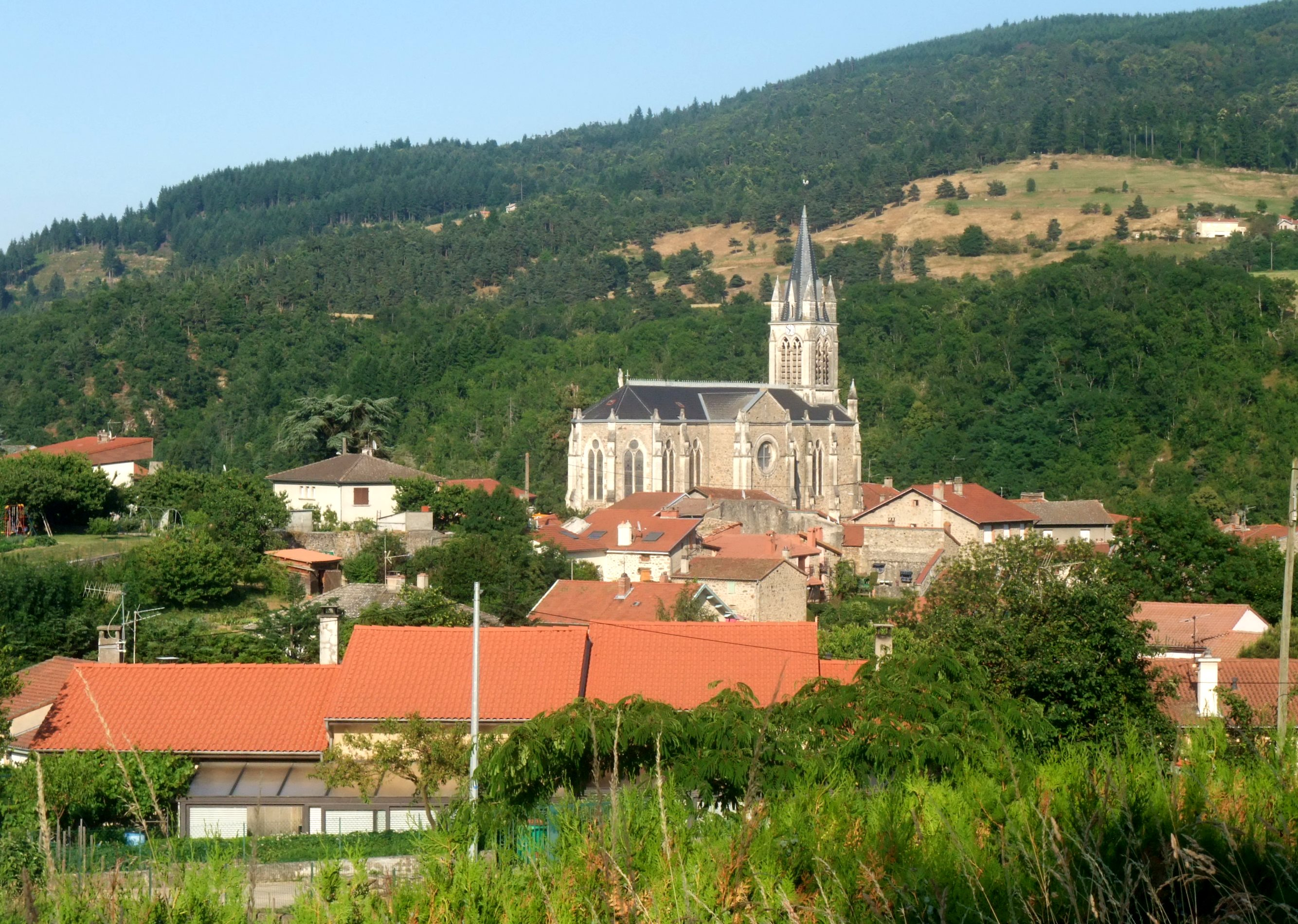
- The church and surrounding buildings in Villevocance
- Location of Villevocance
- Location within France Location within Auvergne-Rhône-Alpes
- Coordinates: 45°13′32″N 4°35′20″E
- Country: France
- Region: Auvergne-Rhône-Alpes
- Department: Ardèche
- Arrondissement: Tournon-sur-Rhône
- Canton: Annonay-2
- Intercommunality: Annonay Rhône Agglo

Government
  - Mayor (2020–2026): Denis Honore
- Area^{1}: 9.38 km^{2} (3.62 sq mi)
- Elevation: 427 m (1,401 ft)
- Highest elevation: 912 m (2,992 ft)
- Lowest elevation: 380 m (1,250 ft)
- Population (2023): 1,165
  - Density: 124/km^{2} (322/sq mi)
- Time zone: UTC+01:00 (CET)
  - Summer (DST): UTC+02:00 (CEST)
- INSEE/Postal code: 07342 /07690
- ^{1} French Land Register data, which excludes lakes, ponds, glaciers > 1 km^{2} (0.386 sq mi or 247 acres) and river estuaries.

Villevocance (French pronunciation: [vilvɔkɑ̃s]; Occitan: Vilavaucança) is a commune in the Ardèche department in southern France.

== Population ==
Historical population
Year	Pop.	±% p.a.
1968	600	—
1975	665	+1.48%
1982	908	+4.55%
1990	1,026	+1.54%
1999	1,089	+0.66%
2007	1,159	+0.78%
2012	1,248	+1.49%
2017	1,171	−1.27%
2023	1,165	−0.09%
Source: INSEE

== See also ==
- Communes of the Ardèche department
