= Pierre Antoine Monneron =

French merchant, banker, writer and politician

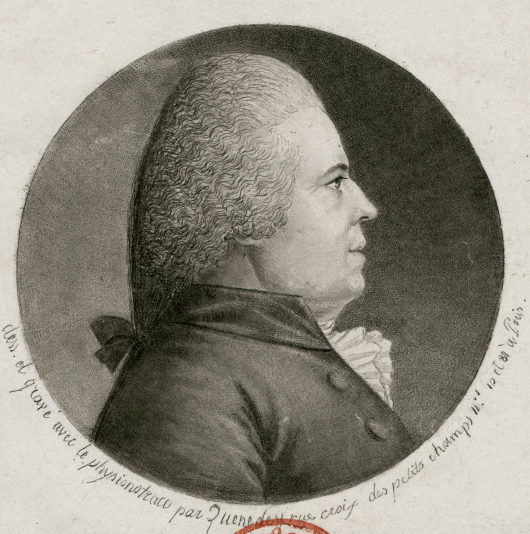

Deputy to the French National Convention for Mauritius
- In office 1791

Personal details
- Born: January 16, 1747 Annonay, Montpellier, France
- Died: June 8, 1801 (aged 54) Pamplemousse, Mauritius

Pierre Antoine Monneron (16 January 1747 – 8 June 1801) was a French merchant, banker, writer and politician.

Monneron was born on 16 January 1747 in Annonay, Ardèche. He was deputy to the French National Convention for Mauritius. On 13 May 1791, he spoke at the National Assembly as a representative of Mauritius on behalf of the rights of people of colour.

His brothers, Joseph François Augustin Monneron and Louis Monneron, were also active in French national and colonial politics of the time, whilst his brother Charles Claude Ange Monneron was an engineer and explorer.

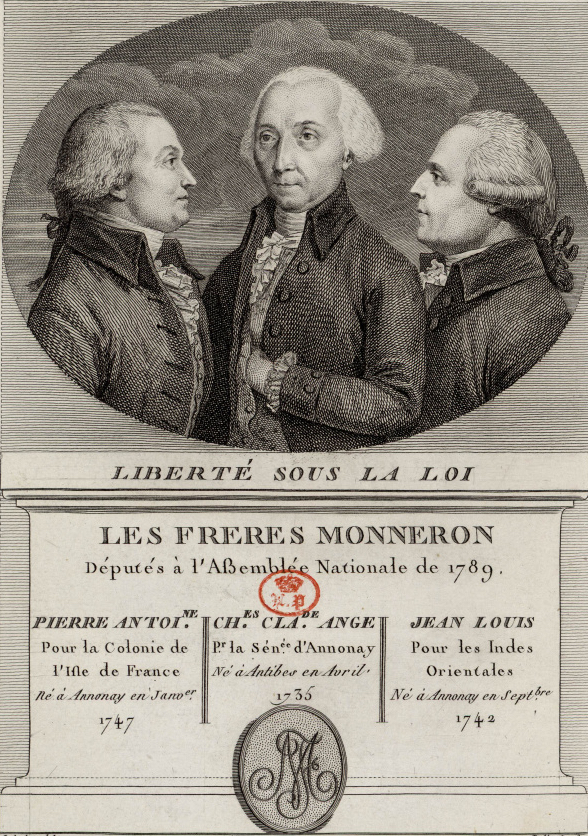
The Monneron brothers. Left to right: Pierre-Antoine, Charles-Claude-Ange, Jean-Louis.

Pierre Monneron died on 8 June 1801 in Pamplemousses, Mauritius, aged 54.
