= Baby God =

- Official poster
- Directed by: Hannah Olson
- Produced by: Hannah Olson
- Cinematography: Justin Zweifach
- Edited by: Toby Shimin
- Music by: Will Epstein
- Production companies: HBO Documentary Films; Loki Films; Gap Tooth Films
- Distributed by: HBO
- Release dates: June 23, 2020 (Nantucket); December 2, 2020 (United States)
- Running time: 78 minutes
- Country: United States
- Language: English

Baby God is a 2020 American documentary film, directed and produced by Hannah Olson, which follows Quincy Fortier, a doctor who used his own sperm to inseminate fertility patients. Heidi Ewing and Rachel Grady were executive producers under their Loki Films banner.

It had its world premiere at the Nantucket Film Festival on June 23, 2020, and was released on December 2, 2020, by HBO.

== Synopsis ==
Quincy Fortier, in a fertility fraud scheme begun in the 1960s, for more than 30 years secretly used his own sperm to inseminate his fertility patients, without their knowledge or consent. Decades later, his biological children discover Fortier is their father and search for answers.

== Production ==
Olson discovered the story after hearing about a doctor using his own sperm to inseminate his fertility patients, and brought it to Heidi Ewing and Rachel Grady who agreed to produce the film, and brought it to HBO Documentary Films who agreed to produce and distribute. Olson felt the story was relevant in the context of Me Too movement and felt it was time to reframe the US fertility industry to a public health concern.

== Release ==
The film was set to have its world premiere at South by Southwest in March 2020, however, the festival was cancelled due to the COVID-19 pandemic. The film had its world premiere at the Nantucket Film Festival on June 23, 2020. It also screened at DOC NYC on November 11, 2020. It was released on December 2, 2020.

== Reception ==
=== Critical reception ===
Baby God holds a 79% approval rating on the review aggregator website Rotten Tomatoes, based on 14 reviews, with an average of 7.2/10. The site's critical consensus reads, "Baby God is unavoidably nauseating as it unearths a heinous legacy, but Hannah Olson's sensitive study of the victims gives this documentary a worthwhile poignancy."

== See also ==
- Almost Family
- Bernard Norman Barwin
- Donald Cline
- Cecil Jacobson
- I Want It All Now!
- List of people with the most children
- Our Father (2022 film)
