= Laurie Levenson =

American lawyer (born 1956)

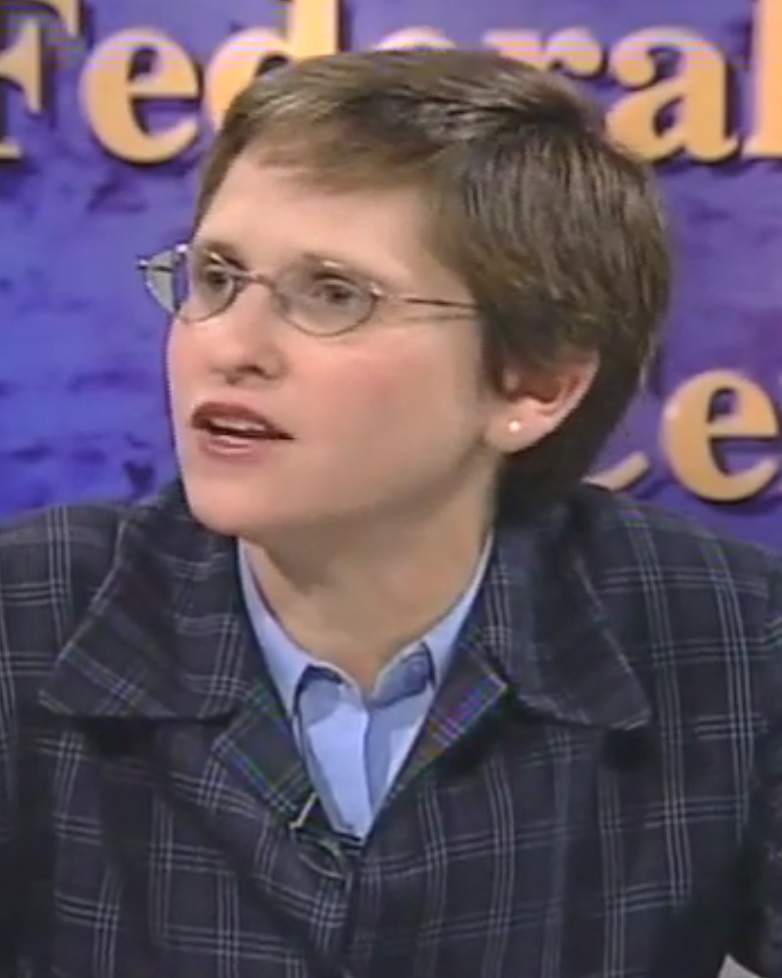
- Born: Laurie Lou Levenson; December 7, 1956 (age 69); Los Angeles County, California, U.S.
- Education: UCLA School of Law (JD); Stanford University (BA)
- Scientific career
- Fields: Law
- Workplaces: Loyola Law School

Laurie Lou Levenson (born December 7, 1956) is a professor of law, William M. Rains Fellow, the David W. Burcham Chair in Ethical Advocacy, and Director of the Center for Legal Advocacy at Loyola Law School of Loyola Marymount University in Los Angeles. She teaches evidence, criminal law, criminal procedure, ethics, anti-terrorism, and white collar crime. She served as Loyola's Associate Dean for Academic Affairs from 1996 to 1999. In addition to her teaching responsibilities, she is the Director of the Loyola Center for Ethical Advocacy. She received the 2003 Professor of the Year awards from both Loyola Law School and the Federal Judicial Center.

== Education ==
Levenson was born on December 7, 1956, and is a native of Los Angeles. She graduated with a B.A. from Stanford University in 1977, and a Juris Doctor (J.D.) from UCLA School of Law in 1980, where she was the chief article editor of the UCLA Law Review.

== Career ==
Levenson clerked for Judge James Hunter III on the United States Court of Appeals for the Third Circuit. Following that, she served as an assistant United States Attorney for the Central District of California, where she rose to the position of assistant division chief.

While a federal prosecutor, she tried a wide variety of federal criminal cases, including violent crimes, narcotics offenses, white collar crimes, and immigration and public corruption cases. She served as Chief of the Training Section and Chief of the Criminal Appellate Section of the U.S. Attorney's Office. In 1988, she received the Attorney General's Director's Award for Superior Performance. She also received commendations from the FBI, IRS, U.S. Postal Service, and DEA.

She joined the Loyola Law School faculty in 1989. She lectures regularly throughout the country and internationally for the Federal Judicial Center, National Judicial College, international bar associations, bar review courses, community groups and legal societies. She also testifies before the Senate Judiciary Committee and the California Legislature regarding SB 490 (Death Penalty).

She has served as a volunteer counsel for the "Webster Commission" and as a Special Master for the Los Angeles Superior Court and United States District Court. She has served as a member of the Los Angeles County Bar Association Judicial Appointments Committee and Judiciary Committee. She serves on the board of directors for Bet Tzedek Legal Services - The House of Justice.

Along with Erwin Chemerinsky, she has argued that a "meaningful public trial in the 1990s requires that it be broadcast because few people realistically can attend court proceedings."

=== Publications and television commentary ===
Levenson has written books on California criminal law and is a frequent television commentator on criminal legal issues, first coming to fame as a frequent commentator for CBS in the O. J. Simpson trial. She has written about the ethics of being a television commentator.

She has been a legal commentator for CBS, CNN, ABC, NBC and NPR. She has commented on a wide range of high-publicity cases, including the O. J. Simpson murder trial, the Rodney King beating trial, the Menendez murder trials, the Michael Jackson molestation case, the Scott Peterson murder trial, the Bernard Madoff investigation, the Clinton impeachment, the Robert Blake murder trial, the trial of Illinois Governor Rod Blagojevich, the prosecution of Anna Nicole Smith’s physicians, UCI Medical Scandal, the Michelle Carter murder trial, and the prosecution of Dr. Conrad Murray.

She was also the legal advisor for the 2001 movie Legally Blonde.
