= List of medical abbreviations: Z =

Abbreviation	Meaning
ZD	zinc deficiency
ZDV	zidovudine
ZES	Zollinger–Ellison syndrome
ZIFT	zygote intrafallopian transfer
ZMC	Zygomatico-Maxillary Complex
Zn	zinc
