= Criminal conspiracy =

Agreement between two or more people to commit a crime at some time in the future

In criminal law, a conspiracy is an agreement between two or more people to commit a crime at some time in the future. Criminal law in some countries or for some conspiracies may require that at least one overt act be undertaken in furtherance of that agreement to constitute an offense. There is no limit to the number participating in the conspiracy, and in most countries the plan itself is the crime, so there is no requirement that any steps have been taken to put the plan into effect (compare attempts which require proximity to the full offense).

For the purposes of concurrence, the actus reus is a continuing one and parties may join the plot later and incur joint liability and conspiracy can be charged where the co-conspirators have been acquitted or cannot be traced. Finally, repentance by one or more parties does not affect liability (unless, in some cases, it occurs before the parties have committed overt acts) but may reduce their sentence.

An unindicted co-conspirator, or unindicted conspirator, is a person or entity that is alleged in an indictment to have engaged in conspiracy but who is not charged in the same indictment. Prosecutors choose to name persons as unindicted co-conspirators for a variety of reasons including grants of immunity, pragmatic considerations, and evidentiary concerns.

== England and Wales ==
=== Common law offence ===
At common law, the crime of conspiracy was capable of infinite growth, able to accommodate any new situation and to criminalize it if the level of threat to society was sufficiently great. The courts were therefore acting in the role of the legislature to create new offences and, following the Law Commission Report No. 76 on Conspiracy and Criminal Law Reform, the Criminal Law Act 1977 produced a statutory offence and abolished all the common law varieties of conspiracy, except two: that of conspiracy to defraud, and that of conspiracy to corrupt public morals or to outrage public decency.

==== Conspiracy to defraud ====
Section 5(2) of the Criminal Law Act 1977 preserved the common law offence of conspiracy to defraud. Conspiracy to defraud was defined in Scott v Commissioner of Police of the Metropolis per Viscount Dilhorne:

"to defraud" ordinarily means ... to deprive a person dishonestly of something which is his or of something to which he is or would or might but for the perpetration of the fraud be entitled.

... an agreement by two or more [persons] by dishonesty to deprive a person of something which is his or to which he is or would be or might be entitled [or] an agreement by two or more by dishonesty to injure some proprietary right of his suffices to constitute the offence.

==== Conspiracy to corrupt public morals or to outrage public decency ====
Section 5(3) Criminal Law Act 1977 preserved the common law offence of conspiracy to corrupt public morals or of conspiracy to outrage public decency. These are offences under the common law of England and Wales.

Section 5(1) of the Criminal Law Act 1977 does not affect the common law offence of conspiracy if, and in so far as, it can be committed by entering into an agreement to engage in conduct which tends to corrupt public morals, or which outrages public decency, but which does not amount to or involve the commission of an offence if carried out by a single person otherwise than in pursuance of an agreement. One authority maintains that conspiracy to "corrupt public morals" has no definitive case law, that it is unknown whether or not it is a substantive offence, and that it is unlikely that conspirators will be prosecuted for this offence.

These two offences cover situations where, for example, a publisher encourages immoral behaviour through explicit content in a magazine or periodical, as in the 1970 case of Knuller (Publishing, Printing and Promotions) Ltd v Director of Public Prosecutions, which ultimately was decided in 1973 by the House of Lords. In the 1991 case of R v Rowley, the defendant left notes in public places over a period of three weeks offering money and presents to boys with the intention of luring them for immoral purposes, but there was nothing lewd, obscene or disgusting in the notes, nor were they printed by a news magazine at the behest of Rowley, which would have invoked the element of conspiracy. The judge ruled that the jury was entitled to look at the purpose behind the notes in deciding whether they were lewd or disgusting. On appeal against conviction, it was held that an act outraging public decency required a deliberate act which was in itself lewd, obscene or disgusting, so Rowley's motive in leaving the notes was irrelevant and, since there was nothing in the notes themselves capable of outraging public decency, the conviction was quashed.

=== Statutory offence ===
This offence was created as a result of the Law Commission's recommendations in their Report, Conspiracy and Criminal Law Reform, 1976, Law Com No 76. This was part of the commission's programme of codification of the criminal law. The eventual aim was to abolish all the remaining common law offences and replace them, where appropriate, with offences precisely defined by statute. The common law offences were seen as unacceptably vague and open to development by the courts in ways which might offend the principle of certainty. There was an additional problem that it could be a criminal conspiracy at common law to engage in conduct which was not in itself a criminal offence: see Law Com No 76, para 1.7. This was a major mischief at which the 1977 Act was aimed, although it retained the convenient concept of a common law conspiracy to defraud: see Law Com No 76, paras 1.9 and 1.16. Henceforward, according to the Law Commission, it would only be an offence to agree to engage in a course of conduct which was itself a criminal offence.

Section 1(1) of the Criminal Law Act 1977 provides:

if a person agrees with any other person or persons that a course of conduct shall be pursued which, if the agreement is carried out in accordance with their intentions, either –

- (a) will necessarily amount to or involve the commission of any offence or offences by one or more of the parties to the agreement, or
- (b) would do so but for the existence of facts which render the commission of the offence or any of the offences impossible, [added by S.5 Criminal Attempts Act 1981]

he is guilty of conspiracy to commit the offence or offences in question.

Section 1A (inserted by the Criminal Justice (Terrorism and Conspiracy) Act 1998, s. 5) bans conspiracies part of which occurred in England and Wales to commit an act or the happening of some other event outside the United Kingdom which constitutes an offence under the law in force in that country or territory. Many conditions apply including that prosecutions need consent from the Attorney General for England and Wales.

==== Exceptions ====
- Under section 2(1) the intended victim of the offence cannot be guilty of conspiracy.
- Under section 2(2) there can be no conspiracy where the only other person(s) to the agreement are:
  1. a spouse or civil partner;
  2. a person under the age of criminal responsibility; or
  3. an intended victim of that offence.

==== Mens rea ====
There must be an agreement between two or more persons. The mens rea of conspiracy is a separate issue from the mens rea required of the substantive crime. Lord Bridge in R v Anderson, quoted in R v Hussain, said:

[A]n essential ingredient in the crime of conspiring to commit a specific offence or offences under section 1(1) of the Act of 1977 is that the accused should agree that a course of conduct be pursued which he knows must involve the commission by one or more of the parties to the agreement of that offence or those offences.

Lord Bridge in R v Anderson also said:

But, beyond the mere fact of agreement, the necessary mens rea of the crime is, in my opinion, established if, and only if, it is shown that the accused, when he entered into the agreement, intended to play some part in the agreed course of conduct in furtherance of the criminal purpose which the agreed course of action was intended to achieve. Nothing less will suffice; nothing more is required.

It is not therefore necessary for any action to be taken in furtherance of the criminal purpose in order for a conspiracy offence to have been committed. This distinguishes a conspiracy from an attempt (which necessarily does involve a person doing an act): see Criminal Attempts Act 1981.

==== Things said or done by one conspirator ====
Adrian Keane in The Modern Law of Evidence, quoted approvingly by Lord Steyn in R v Hayter, wrote:

In two exceptional situations, a confession may be admitted not only as evidence against its maker but also as evidence against a co-accused implicated thereby. The first is where the co-accused by his words or conduct accepts the truth of the statement so as to make all or part of it a confession statement of his own. The second exception, which is perhaps best understood in terms of implied agency, applies in the case of conspiracy: statements (or acts) of one conspirator which the jury is satisfied were said (or done) in the execution or furtherance of the common design are admissible in evidence against another conspirator, even though he was not present at the time, to prove the nature and scope of the conspiracy, provided that there is some independent evidence to show the existence of the conspiracy and that the other conspirator was a party to it.

=== History ===
According to Edward Coke, conspiracy was originally a statutory remedy against false accusation and prosecution by "a consultation and agreement between two or more to appeal or indict an innocent man falsely and maliciously of felony, whom they cause to be indicted and appealed; and afterward the party is lawfully acquitted". In Poulterer's Case, 77 Eng. Rep. 813 (K.B. 1611), the court reasoned that the thrust of the crime was the confederating of two or more, and dropped the requirement that an actual indictment of an innocent take place, whereby precedent was set that conspiracy only need involve an attempted crime, and that the agreement was the act, which enabled subsequent holdings against an agreement to commit any crime, not just that originally proscribed.

==== Conspiracy to trespass ====
In Kamara v Director of Public Prosecutions, nine students, who were nationals of Sierra Leone, appealed their convictions for conspiracy to trespass, and unlawful assembly. These persons, together with others who did not appeal, conspired to occupy the London premises of the High Commissioner for Sierra Leone in order to publicize grievances against the government of that country. Upon their arrival at the commission, they threatened the caretaker with an imitation firearm and locked him in a reception room with ten other members of the staff. The students then held a press conference on the telephone, but the caretaker was able to contact the police, who arrived, released the prisoners, and arrested the accused. In this case the Court felt that the public interest was clearly involved because of the statutory duty of the British Government to protect diplomatic premises. Lauton J delivered the judgment of the Court of Appeal dismissing the appeal from conviction.

==== Conspiracy to corrupt public morals and conspiracy to outrage public decency ====
These offences were at one time tied up with prostitution and homosexual behaviour. After the Second World War, due to the fame of several convicts, the Wolfenden report was commissioned by government, and was published in 1957. Thereupon came the publication of several books, both pro and contra the report. Of these books we can isolate two representatives: Lord Devlin wrote in favour of societal norms, or morals, while H. L. A. Hart wrote that the state could ill regulate private conduct. In May 1965, Devlin is reported to have conceded defeat.

The Street Offences Act 1959 prohibited England's prostitutes from soliciting in the streets. One Shaw published a booklet containing prostitutes' names and addresses; each woman listed had paid Shaw for her advertisement. A 1962 majority in the House of Lords not only found the appellant guilty of a statutory offence (living on the earnings of prostitution), but also of the "common law misdemeanour of conspiracy to corrupt public morals".

In the case of Knuller (Publishing, Printing and Promotions) Ltd v DPP, which was decided in 1973 in the House of Lords, the appellants were directors of a company which published a fortnightly magazine. On an inside page under a column headed "Males" advertisements were inserted inviting readers to meet the advertisers for the purpose of homosexual practices. The appellants were convicted on counts of

1. conspiracy to corrupt public morals, and
2. conspiracy to outrage public decency.

The appeal on count 1 was dismissed, while the appeal on count 2 was allowed because in the present case there had been a misdirection in relation to the meaning of "decency" and the offence of "outrage". The list of cases consulted in the ratio decidendi is lengthy, and the case of Shaw v DPP is a topic of furious discussion.

==== Conspiracy to effect a public mischief ====
In Withers v Director of Public Prosecutions, which reached the House of Lords in 1974, it was unanimously held that conspiracy to effect a public mischief was not a separate and distinct class of criminal conspiracy. This overruled earlier decisions to the contrary effect. The Law Commission published a consultation paper on this subject in 1975.

==== Conspiracy to murder ====
The offence of conspiracy to murder was created in statutory law by section 4 of the Offences Against the Person Act 1861.

== Northern Ireland ==
=== Common law offence ===
Article 13(1) of the Criminal Attempts and Conspiracy (Northern Ireland) Order 1983 (S.I. 1983/1120 (N.I. 13)) does not affect the common law offence of conspiracy so far as it relates to conspiracy to defraud.

=== Statutory offence ===
Part IV of the Criminal Attempts and Conspiracy (Northern Ireland) Order 1983 (S.I. 1983/1120 (N.I. 13)) explains the offence of conspiracy.

== United States ==
Conspiracy has been defined in the United States as an agreement of two or more people to commit a crime, or to accomplish a legal end through illegal actions. Conspiracy law usually does not require proof of specific intent by the defendants to injure any specific person to establish an illegal agreement. Instead, usually the law requires only that the conspirators have agreed to engage in a certain illegal act; however, the application of conspiracy laws requires a tacit agreement among members of a group to commit a crime. Such laws allow the government to charge a defendant regardless of whether the planned criminal act has been committed or the possibility of the crime being carried out successfully. In most U.S. jurisdictions, for a person to be convicted of conspiracy, not only must he or she agree to commit a crime, but at least one of the conspirators must commit an overt act (the actus reus) in furtherance of the crime. In United States v. Shabani, the U.S. Supreme Court ruled that this "overt act" element is not required under the federal drug conspiracy statute, 21 U.S.C. section 846. The conspirators can be guilty even if they do not know the identity of the other members of the conspiracy.

California criminal law is somewhat representative of other jurisdictions. A punishable conspiracy exists when at least two people form an agreement to commit a crime, and at least one of them does some act in furtherance to committing the crime. Each person is punishable in the same manner and to the same extent as is provided for the punishment of the crime itself. One example of this is the Han twins murder conspiracy case, where one twin sister attempted to hire two youths to have her twin sister killed. One important feature of a conspiracy charge is that it relieves prosecutors of the need to prove the particular roles of conspirators. If two persons plot to kill another (and this can be proven), and the victim is indeed killed as a result of the actions of either conspirator, it is not necessary to prove with specificity which of the conspirators actually pulled the trigger. It is also an option for prosecutors, when bringing conspiracy charges, to decline to indict all members of the conspiracy (though the existence of all members may be mentioned in an indictment). Such unindicted co-conspirators are commonly found when the identities or whereabouts of members of a conspiracy are unknown, or when the prosecution is concerned only with a particular individual among the conspirators. This is common when the target of the indictment is an elected official or an organized crime leader, and the co-conspirators are persons of little or no public importance. More famously, President Richard Nixon was named as an unindicted co-conspirator by the Watergate special prosecutor in an event leading up to his eventual resignation.

=== Conspiracy against the United States ===
Conspiracy against the United States, or conspiracy to defraud the United States, is a federal offense in the United States under 18 U.S.C. § 371. The crime is that of two or more persons who conspire to commit an offense against the United States, or to defraud the United States.

=== Conspiracy against rights ===
The United States has a federal statute dealing with conspiracies to deprive a citizen of rights secured by the U.S. Constitution.

=== Unindicted co-conspirators ===
The United States Attorneys' Manual generally recommends against naming unindicted co-conspirators, although their use is not generally prohibited by law or policy. Some commentators have raised due-process concerns over the use of unindicted co-conspirators. Although there have been few cases on the subject, the Fifth Circuit Court of Appeals addressed these concerns in 1975 United States v. Briggs.

==== President Richard Nixon ====
Unindicted co-conspirator was familiarized in 1974 when then President Richard Nixon was named as an unindicted co-conspirator in indictments stemming from the Watergate Investigation. Nixon was not indicted, because of concerns about whether the U.S. Constitution allowed the indictment of a sitting President (executive privilege).

==== President Donald Trump ====
Unindicted co-conspirator made a resurgence in the public discourse when U.S. President Donald Trump was allegedly named as an unindicted co-conspirator in the conviction of Trump's lawyer Michael Cohen for lying to Congress, tax evasion, uttering fraudulent documents, and campaign finance offenses. Although Trump was not named explicitly, with the term "Un-indicted co-conspirator number 1" used instead, Cohen subsequently testified in Congress that "Un-indicted co-conspirator number 1" referred to Donald Trump.

=== Mueller investigation ===
Special counsel Robert Mueller used "coordination" and "conspiracy" in a synonymous fashion as he looked for evidence of agreed coordination, not just a mutual understanding ("two parties taking actions that were informed by or responsive to the other's actions or interests"). Mueller expressly explained why he was not interested in proving mere collusion, which he, for the purposes of his investigation, determined was not the same as "conspiracy". There had to be "coordination", which implies a conscious "agreement". In discussing conspiracy vs. collusion, Mueller wrote:

To establish whether a crime was committed by members of the Trump campaign with regard to Russian interference, investigators "applied the framework of conspiracy law", and not the concept of "collusion", because collusion "is not a specific offense or theory of liability found in the United States Code, nor is it a term of art in federal criminal law". They also investigated if members of the Trump campaign "coordinated" with Russia, using the definition of "coordination" as having "an agreement — tacit or express — between the Trump campaign and the Russian government on election interference". Investigators further elaborated that merely having "two parties taking actions that were informed by or responsive to the other's actions or interests" was not enough to establish coordination.

The report writes that the investigation "identified numerous links between the Russian government and the Trump campaign", found that Russia "perceived it would benefit from a Trump presidency" and that the 2016 Trump presidential campaign "expected it would benefit electorally" from Russian hacking efforts. However, ultimately "the investigation did not establish that members of the Trump campaign conspired or coordinated with the Russian government in its election interference activities". The evidence was not necessarily complete due to encrypted, deleted, or unsaved communications as well as false, incomplete, or declined testimony.

== International law ==
Conspiracy law was used at the Nuremberg Trials for members of the Nazi leadership charged with participating in a "conspiracy or common plan" to commit international crimes. This was controversial because conspiracy was not a part of the European civil law tradition. Nonetheless, the crime of conspiracy continued in international criminal justice, and was incorporated into the international criminal laws against genocide. Of the Big Five, only the French Republic exclusively subscribed to the civil law; the USSR subscribed to the socialist law, the U.S. and the U.K. followed the common law; and the Republic of China did not have a cause of action at this particular proceeding. In addition, both the civil and the customary law were upheld. The jurisdiction of the International Military Tribunal was unique and extraordinary at its time, being a court convened under the law of nations and the laws and customs of war. It was the first of its sort in human history, and found several defendants not guilty.

== See also ==
- Civil conspiracy
- List of political conspiracies
- Paranoia

== Bibliography ==
- Fichtelberg, Aaron (2006). "Conspiracy and International Criminal Justice". Criminal Law Forum. 17 (2): 149–176. doi:10.1007/s10609-006-9013-6.
