= Fertility fraud =

Non-consensual fertility treatments

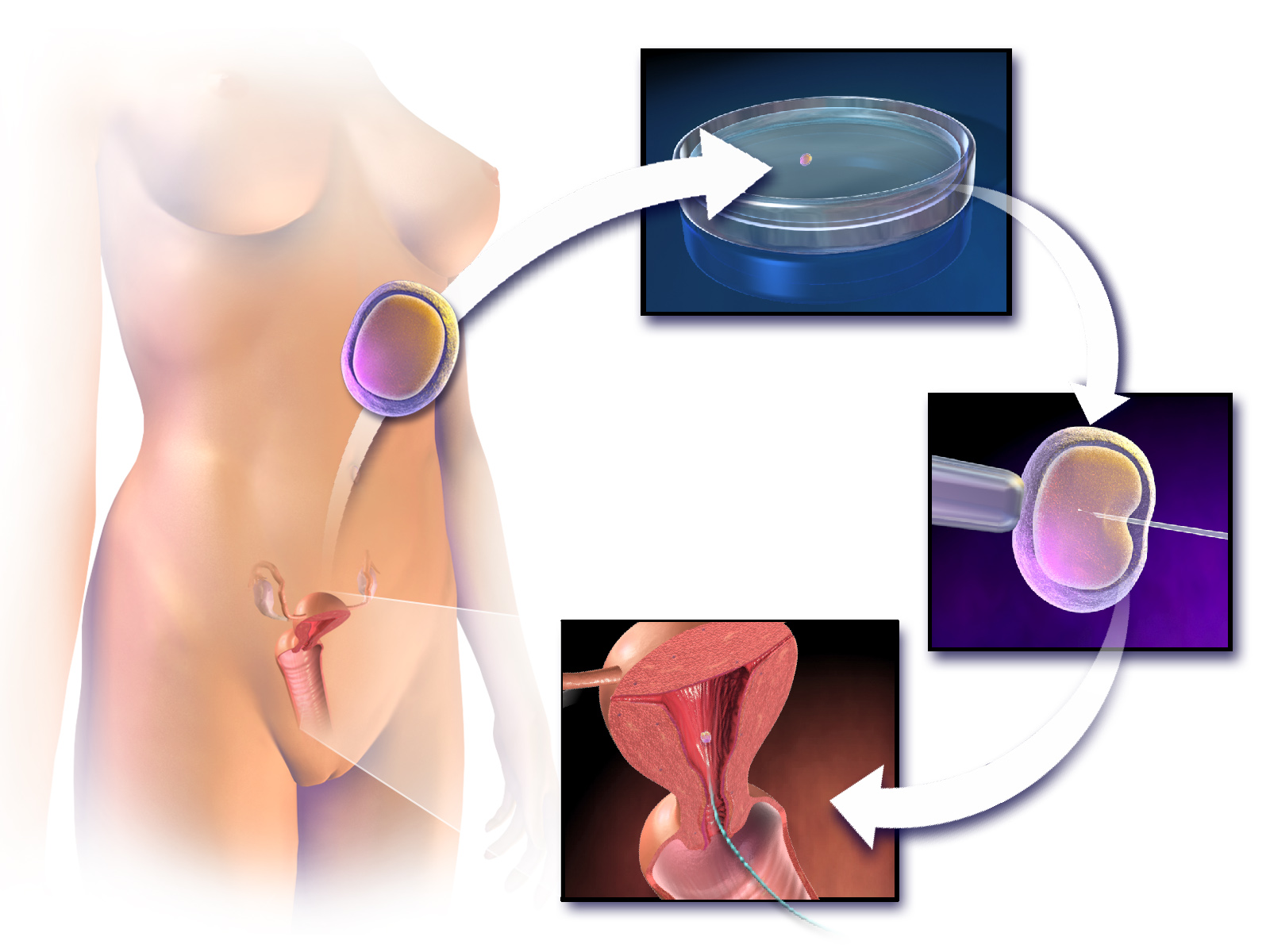
Diagram showing steps involved in intracytoplasmic sperm injection. Insemination fraud could occur in the third step.

Fertility fraud is the failure on the part of a fertility doctor to obtain consent from a patient before inseminating her with his own sperm. This normally occurs in the context of people using assisted reproductive technology (ART) to address fertility issues.

The term is also used in cases where donor eggs are used without consent and more broadly, in instances where doctors and other medical professionals exploit opportunities that arise when people use assisted reproductive technology to address fertility issues. This may give rise to a number of different types of fraud involving insurance, unnecessary procedures, theft of eggs, and other issues related to fertility treatment.

== Types ==
The main sense of fertility fraud is non-consensual insemination of a patient by her doctor, but there are other types as well.

=== Egg theft ===
The first "test tube baby" was facilitated by Robert Edwards in 1978, and he allegedly used eggs without the consent of the women involved.

One of the earliest cases involving egg theft occurred in 1987 in Garden Grove, California, in a clinic run by doctor Ricardo Asch, and his partners doctors Sergio Stone and Jose Balmaceda. Asch took eggs from women undergoing diagnostic procedures and used them in fertility procedures in other women. Asch and his two partners were accused of taking eggs and embryos from patients without their consent, using them to cause pregnancies in other women, and defrauding insurance companies. The eggs of at least 20 women were used, and at least fifteen live births resulted. Thirty-five patients filed legal actions against Asch. An estimated 67 women were victims of egg or embryo theft. Asch and Balmaceda left the country and avoided trial. Stone faced trial in the case and was sentenced to three years probation for mail fraud. He was fined $50,000 by the judge in the case, required to repay more than $14,000 in restitution to insurance companies, and had to wear an electronic monitoring device.

In the "Egg Affair" in Israel in 2000, police investigated two doctors who were accused of intentionally creating extra eggs in patients needing fertility procedures, and then without their patients' knowledge harvesting and selling the eggs to other fertility patients.

In Italy in 2016, famed Italian gynecologist Severino Antinori, known as the "grandmothers' obstetrician" because of his reputation for helping women over 60 to bear children, was arrested on suspicion of stealing eggs by removing them from a patient's ovaries without her consent under the guise of performing a procedure on her to remove an ovarian cyst. Antinori had recently hired a Spanish nurse at his clinic, and then diagnosed her with an ovarian cyst for the sole purpose of harvesting her eggs without her knowledge. Antinori was arrested at a Rome airport, charged with aggravated robbery and causing personal injury, and placed under house arrest.

=== Insemination fraud ===
Diagram of injection of a spermatozoon into a human egg cell

There have been numerous cases of a healthcare provider fraudulently substituting their own sperm for donor sperm, resulting in pregnancy and birth.

- Quincy Fortier, a fertility specialist in Las Vegas, Nevada, in the early 1960s, impregnated female patients with his own sperm leading to 26 children during his 40-year practice. He died in 2006, aged 94 and the story was uncovered only in 2018 when a woman used a home DNA test to celebrate her retirement. The HBO documentary Baby God aired in 2020 was based on the story of Fortier and his decades-long fertility fraud scheme.
- Cecil Jacobson, a fertility doctor in the 1980s in Virginia, was originally found to be the biological father of at least seven of his patients' children, including one patient who was supposed to have been inseminated with sperm provided by her husband. DNA tests have since linked Jacobson to at least 15 such children, and it has been suspected that he fathered as many as 75 children by impregnating patients with his own sperm.
- In 2018, a woman in Washington State filed suit in U.S. District Court in Idaho against Gerald Mortimer, who was her mother's fertility doctor when her parents resided in Idaho Falls. After having difficulty becoming pregnant, her mother sought help from Mortimer and eventually became pregnant in 1980. The connection to Mortimer was hidden for 37 years until it was finally revealed when the now adult daughter used a DNA kit which returned the connection to Mortimer as her biological father, who had used his own sperm rather than an anonymous donor as agreed.
- Donald Cline used his own sperm in his fertility practice in Indianapolis between 1974 and 1987 to covertly father at least 94 offspring. This came to light in 2014, when home DNA test kits were proliferating, and led to the discovery of Cline having used his own sperm to fertilize his patients' eggs. Because there was no law concerning the practice in Indiana, he was charged with obstruction of justice, false advertising, and immoral conduct, and lost his license to practice medicine. Cline pleaded guilty to two Level 6 felony counts of obstruction of justice and received a one-year suspended sentence. The first law in the United States came into effect in 2019 in the state of Indiana as a result of this case. As of May 2022, Cline has paid over $1.35 million to settle three lawsuits, with three more pending. Similar cases were found in other states.
- John Boyd Coates III, a Vermont fertility doctor, has had two lawsuits filed against him and has been charged with using his own sperm in cases going back 40 years. His license has since been revoked and a $5.25 million judgment in damages was awarded to the first plaintiff.
- Jos Beek, a gynecologist in the Netherlands, conceived 21 children and potentially dozens more using his own sperm after prospective parents turned to him for fertility treatment, an investigation has discovered. He worked at Elisabeth hospital in Leiderdorp, now part of Alrijne hospital, between 1973 and 1998. He died in 2019.
- In September 2020, a San Diego woman sued Dr. Phillip M. Milgram for having used his own sperm to inseminate her three decades earlier, instead of anonymous donor sperm. The deception was discovered when her adult son found that Milgram was his biological father after using a home DNA test kit from 23andMe.
- In November 2020, a northern California woman sued her former fertility doctor Michael Kiken for having falsely inseminated her with his own sperm forty years prior. She bore two children, but only learned in 2019 from a DNA test kit that her daughter had received as a gift showed that her former fertility doctor is her children's biological father. In addition, her children may have inherited a genetic disease passed on by Kiken.
- Jan Karbaat, a fertility doctor in the Netherlands, fathered 90 confirmed children and may have as many as 200 children. He died in 2017.
- In 2021, Norman Barwin, an Ottawa fertility doctor, paid out a settlement of $13.375 million to his seventeen children conceived in his clinic in Canada in the 1980s. A total of 244 former patients and their children, including the seventeen conceived using his own sperm, are among the claimants.
- In April 2022, a Colorado jury awarded $8.75 million to the families of a dozen women who became pregnant while being treated for infertility using artificial insemination techniques by doctor Paul Brennan Jones of Grand Junction who used his own sperm while the women were his patients in the 1980s. The jury found Jones liable for negligence, fraud, and other claims.
- Fertility doctor Burton Caldwell created at least 22 children using his own sperm. Two of his offspring, both the result of insemination fraud, dated in high school, which is the first verified case of accidental half-siblings incest occurring as a consequence of insemination fraud. It has long been theorized that a large number of people with unrecognized very close genetic relationships living in the same community could result in accidental incest.

=== Other ===
There are many other types of fertility fraud, and they may take place at various stages of the process:

- Competing for patients via misleading information about success rates, either in advertising or during personal interviews
- Performing an assisted reproductive technology procedure not covered by insurance, and then billing for a different procedure
- Performing unnecessary or futile procedures on patients who are misinformed or poorly informed
- False claims of pregnancy, followed by assertions of fetal death
- Misuse of sperm, eggs, and embryos, in particular, a health care person substituting their own sperm for donor sperm
- Inadequate screening of donors
- Embezzlement from sperm banks, theft of human eggs ("egg-snatching") or embryos, or use of eggs without consent

== Legal status ==
State penalizes some form of fertility fraud An active bill is pending

Hundreds of children have been fathered by non-consensual insemination worldwide by their physicians, including in the United States, Canada, and the Netherlands, but without specific laws outlawing it, the legal consequences are unclear. Sometimes other laws related to fertility fraud are used against the physician, such as mail, travel, or wire fraud, while others face civil suits. Some physicians have faced ethics charges by the governing bodies of their profession and lost their license to practice medicine.

=== United States ===
In the United States, medical students in the 1960s and 1970s donated sperm, and later while trying to develop their practice as a physician, may have gone on to use their own sperm in order to establish a track record of success. There were no laws on the books at the time prohibiting such activity.

Activists have pushed for legislation that would make fertility fraud a crime, and as of February 2022, seven U.S. states have passed laws, and seven others were considering it.

== Scope ==
In the United States, over fifty fertility doctors have been accused of fraud in connection with donating sperm according to a February 2022 news report.

== Media adaptations ==
In 2020, Somethin' Else and Sony Music Entertainment released a podcast telling the story of Jan Karbaat and his children called "The Immaculate Deception".

In 2020, HBO released the documentary Baby God chronicling the life of Quincy Fortier.

In 2021, The Dutch three-part miniseries Seeds of Deceit tells the story of Dutch fertility doctor Jan Karbaat, who inseminated his patients with his own sperm.

In 2022, Netflix released the documentary Our Father by Jason Blum in the true crime genre about the Donald Cline case in the 1970s and 1980s, to mixed reviews.

== See also ==
- Bertold Wiesner – Austrian-born physiologist (1901–1972)
- Diethylstilbestrol – Chemical compound
- DNA paternity testing – DNA matching techniques to identify someone's father
- DNA profiling – Technique used to identify individuals via DNA characteristics
- Egg donation – Method of assisted reproduction
- Genealogical DNA test – DNA-based genetic test
- Human cloning – Creation of a genetically identical copy of a human
- Human fertilization – Union of a human egg and sperm
- Infertility – Inability to reproduce
- Intracytoplasmic sperm injection – In vitro fertilization procedure
- In vitro fertilization – Assisted reproductive technology procedure
- Jonathan Jacob Meijer – Dutch serial sperm donor (born 1981)
- Medical ethics – System of moral principles of the practice of medicine
- Non-paternity event – Situation where the biological father is not who it was presumed to be
- Paternity fraud – Deliberate misidentification of a child's biological father
- Religious response to ART – Challenges for traditional communities
- Reproductive rights – Legal rights and freedoms relating to reproduction and reproductive health
- Sperm bank – Facility that allocates human semen
- Sperm donation – Method of assisted reproduction
- Sperm theft – Causing a pregnancy using semen obtained by force or deception
- Stealthing – Removing a condom without partner's consent

== Works cited ==
- Boffey, Daniel (2022-02-02). "Netherlands fertility doctor used own sperm to father 21 children". The Guardian.
- Case, Angela; Meckles, Jennifer; Vanderveen, Chris (27 April 2022). "Jury awards $8.75 million in case of doctor who used own sperm to impregnate patients". 9News.
- Ariana Eunjung Cha (22 November 2018). "Fertility fraud: People conceived through errors, misdeeds in the industry are pressing for justice". Washington Post.
- Daniels, Robert (11 May 2022). "Our Father". RogerEbert.com. Chaz Ebert.
- Deseret News (11 May 1998). "Fertility doctor gets 3 years for role in egg-theft scandal". Salt Lake City: Robin Ritch.
- Dyer, Owen (2022-04-05). "US fertility doctor must pay $5m damages for using own sperm in IVF". BMJ. 377: o895. doi:10.1136/bmj.o895. ISSN 1756-1833. PMID 35383093. S2CID 247955881.
- Fox, Dov; Cohen, I. Glenn; Adashi, Eli Y. (November 2019). "Fertility Fraud, Legal Firsts, and Medical Ethics". Obstetrics & Gynecology. 134 (5): 918–920. doi:10.1097/AOG.0000000000003516. PMID 31599835. S2CID 204028910.
- Horton, Adrian (2 December 2020). "Baby God: how DNA testing uncovered a shocking web of fertility fraud". The Guardian.
- Huard, Christine (16 September 2020). "San Diego Woman Sues Doctor for Alleged Artificial Insemination With Own Sperm". Times of San Diego.
- Keays, Alan J. (2022-03-28). "Former fertility doctor takes stand, admits using own sperm to impregnate woman". VTDigger.
- Kirchgaessner, Stephanie (15 May 2016). "Controversial Italian fertility doctor accused of stealing patient's egg". The Guardian.
- Klein, Amy (16 September 2020), "Whose Sperm Is This? - Tel Aviv Review of Books", Tel Aviv Review of Books
- Lemmens, Trudo; Jennifer Bergman; Kanksha Mahadevia Ghimire; Maryam Shahid (20 December 2020). Medical Law in Canada (2 ed.). Kluwer Law International B.V. ISBN 9789403529615. OCLC 1231653350.
- MacKinnon, Angus; AGF (15 May 2016). "Italian fertility doctor under arrest for eggs 'theft'". ABS-CBN.
- Marquis, Julie (16 November 1995). "Fertility Clinic Doctor Denies Charges on TV : Embryos: Asch says U.S. society is obsessed with genes, and he expresses doubts that accusers were all his patients at UCI". LA Times.
- Morris, Nicky (12 May 2022). "Our Father viewers all saying the same thing about chilling Netflix documentary". Hello!.
- Mroz, Jacqueline (28 February 2022). "When an Ancestry Search Reveals Fertility Fraud". New York Times.
- "Doctor Is Found Guilty in Fertility Case". The New York Times. 1992-03-05. p. 14.
- Payne, Elizabeth (2 November 2021). "Settlement against disgraced Ottawa fertility doctor Norman Barwin gets court approval". Ottawa Citizen.
- Romo, Vanessa (4 April 2018). "DNA Test Reveals Fertility Doctor Used His Own Sperm To Impregnate Patient". NPR.
- Salinger, Lawrence M., ed. (14 June 2013). Encyclopedia of White-Collar and Corporate Crime, Volume 1 (2 ed.). SAGE Publications. pp. 332–. ISBN 978-1-4522-7616-8. OCLC 1043479471.
- Sforza, Teri (25 January 2011). "Should UC go after fertility fraud doctor's assets?". Orange County Register.
- Thorne, Will (4 March 2021). "Docuseries 'Seeds of Deceit' Unravels Twisted Tale of Fertility Doctor Who Used His Own Sperm". Variety.
- Weiner, Rachel (19 November 2020). "Woman sues after learning 'anonymous' sperm donor was her own fertility doctor". Washington Post.
- Weisberg, D. Kelly (2 February 2020). Modern Family Law: Cases and Materials (7 ed.). Wolters Kluwer Law & Business. pp. 771–. ISBN 978-1-5438-0459-1. OCLC 1140372724.
- Yoshino, Kimi (20 January 2006). "UC Irvine Fertility Scandal Isn't Over". Los Angeles Times. ISSN 0458-3035.
- Zhang, Sarah (7 May 2019). "A Decades-Old Doctor's Secret Leads to New Fertility-Fraud Law". The Atlantic.
