= Bernard Norman Barwin =

Canadian general practitioner and medical professor

- Citizenship: Canadian
- Occupations: physician, medical professor
- Years active: 1965-2019
- Known for: He was appointed to the Order of Canada in 1997, but resigned the award in 2013 after admitting to professional misconduct.

Bernard Norman Barwin is a Canadian physician and medical professor. He was appointed to the Order of Canada in 1997, but resigned the award in 2013 after admitting to professional misconduct.

== Early life and education ==
Barwin was born in South Africa to parents of Russian and Lithuanian background. He is also of Ashkenazi Jewish descent. Barwin and his wife left South Africa after he completed his first degree in 1962, in opposition to the Sharpeville massacre. He completed his medical training in Belfast, Northern Ireland.

== Career ==
Barwin was director of the High Risk Pregnancy Clinic and co-director of the Ottawa General Hospital's fertility clinic. He left in 1984 because he was not a certified gynaecologist in Canada. He would then establish his own clinic, though still licensed as a general physician.

He was the Associate Professor of Obstetrics and Gynaecology at the University of Ottawa. He was also one of the founding members of Fertility Self-Help Group (ISSG), which later became the Infertility Awareness Association of Canada. He also founded Canadians for Choice and has been President since 2004. In addition, he was the President of the Canadian Fertility Society, the Planned Parenthood Federation of Canada and Planned Parenthood Ottawa.

In 1997, Barwin was appointed to the Order of Canada for having a "profound impact on both the biological and psycho-social aspects of women's reproductive health." In 2009, he was awarded the Honorary degree of Doctor of Laws from Carleton University.

== Sperm Cuckoldry ==
In 1995, Loree-Ann Huard and Wanda Cowton sued Barwin for allegedly using the wrong sperm donor. The couple and Barwin settled out of court in 1998. In 2010, two former patients of Barwin brought lawsuits against him alleging that he had inseminated them with the wrong sperm.

In January 2013, Barwin admitted to professional misconduct in regards to four women who were artificially inseminated with the wrong sperm. A panel of the College of Physicians and Surgeons of Ontario found Barwin guilty of one of three counts of professional misconduct. They issued an official reprimand, revoked his license practice for two months, and ordered him to cover the $3,650 cost of the disciplinary proceedings. A review of the incidents could find no "evident" reasons for the error. He resigned from his appointment to the Order of Canada and it was formally removed later that year.

On 1 November 2016, former patients of Barwin brought a class action against Barwin on behalf of his former patients and the children that Barwin helped conceive at his clinic, the Broadview Fertility Clinic. The statement of claim alleged that Barwin used his own sperm when inseminating his patients.

His medical licence was revoked by the College of Physicians and Surgeons of Ontario in 2019.

On 1 November 2021, a judge approved a $13 million dollar settlement against Barwin.

== See also ==
- Baby God
- Donald Cline
- Fertility fraud
- Cecil Jacobson
- List of people with the most children
- Our Father (2022 film)
