= Puah Institute =

- Founded: 1990
- Founder: R' Menachem Burstein
- Purpose: Fertility medicine, Gynecology, Jewish law, Education
- Location: Jerusalem, Israel
- Region served: Global
- Method: Free fertility consultations for couples
- Website: puahonline.org

The PUAH Institute (Hebrew: מכון פועה Machon Puah) is an Israel-based, international organization that works with Jewish couples with fertility problems. PUAH was founded in 1990 at the request of Rabbi Mordechai Eliyahu to bridge the gap between fertility treatment and Jewish law.

The institute offers counseling services and technical support for couples engaging with infertility.

== Background ==
In vitro fertilisation and related treatments at their outset in the 1980s were viewed with great skepticism by the religious communities.

Within the Orthodox Jewish community, the concept was debated. In general, traditional Judaism views medical intervention positively. Regarding ART, the positive view of medicine is challenged by the Jewish religious legal system (halakha) which has numerous laws regarding modesty, sexuality and verifiable lineage.

Rabbi Menachem Burstein was requested by Rabbi Mordechai Eliyahu to create a framework to assist couples in navigating the medical options while remaining within halakha.

== Services ==
The institute receives daily calls and services many couples each year. Advisers are mostly available by phone and email - rarely in person.

== Counseling Services ==
Puah works with couples both by reviewing medical records and advising as to specific doctors and by finding solutions to problems of Jewish law raised by treatment procedures. Common problems in ART and halacha include sperm sampling and banking, fertility treatments on Shabbat and surrogacy.

== Supervision Services ==

Due to fear of both human error and intentional deception (as in the case of Cecil Jacobson) the majority of orthodox rabbis have ruled that Jewish law requires an outside supervisor present to monitor the procedure and storage of the genetic material. An orthodox man or women must oversee all aspects of the in vitro fertilization (IVF) process, including sample washing, centrifugation, freezing and loading of pipettes.

If the clinic can spare it, the lab will have a dedicated incubator or storage tanks for the Puah-supervised couples. That particular incubator, unlike those containing the reproductive material of non-supervised couples, is locked with a latch and key. The Puah supervisor is the only person with a key.

An alternative is a stainless steel case with dime sized holes in it, known as a Puanite box. The material is placed inside the container, which is then locked with a plastic or metal tie embossed seal with the supervising organization's insignia and placed on one of the incubator shelves. The case can only be opened by snipping the tie.

Puah Institute provides these supervision services in Israel, Europe, Australia, South Africa, South America, the United States and Canada.

== Educational Programs ==
The interplay between traditional Jewish law and modern medicine has created many challenges for the Jewish community. Over the past 30 years many people and organizations have worked to bridge this gap. Puah's educational department works to educate medical professionals to better understand the religious lifestyle and restrictions of the Orthodox Jewish patient and to educate Rabbis to understand the medical challenges and options confronting their congregants.

In January 2010, Puah launched JewishFertility.org, an educational website giving information about the practical applications and interactions of Jewish law and fertility medicine. The web site is presented as a guide for couples experiencing infertility issues.

Professional expertise is also available to the general public through a wide variety of lectures worldwide, training courses and educational news releases. An annual conference is held in Jerusalem each year aimed at the broad public with attendance of over 1500.

== See also ==
- A T.I.M.E.
- Bonei Olam
- Religious response to ART
