= Assisted reproductive technology =

Methods to achieve pregnancy by artificial or partially artificial means

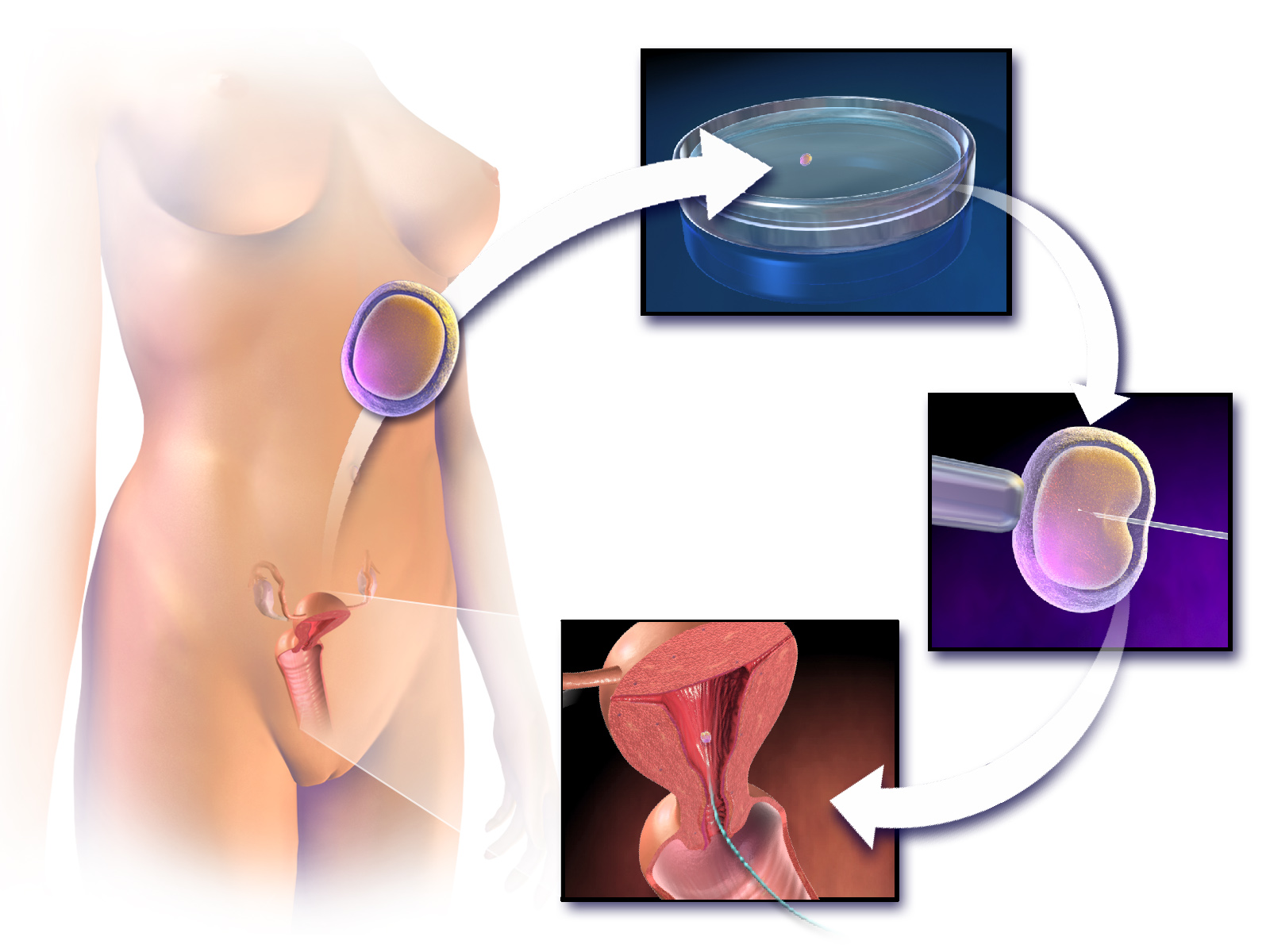
- Illustration depicting intracytoplasmic sperm injection (ICSI), an example of assisted reproductive technology
- Other names: ART
- MeSH: D027724

Assisted reproductive technology (ART) includes medical procedures used primarily to address infertility. This subject involves procedures such as in vitro fertilization (IVF), intracytoplasmic sperm injection (ICSI), and cryopreservation of gametes and embryos, and the use of fertility medication. When used to address infertility, ART may also be referred to as fertility treatment. ART primarily belongs to the field of reproductive endocrinology and infertility. Some forms of ART may be used by fertile couples for genetic purposes (see preimplantation genetic diagnosis). ART may also be used in surrogacy arrangements, although not all surrogacy arrangements involve ART.

== Procedures ==
=== General ===
With ART, the process of sexual intercourse is bypassed and fertilization of the oocyte occurs in the laboratory environment (i.e., in vitro fertilization).

In the US, the Centers for Disease Control and Prevention (CDC) defines ART to include "all fertility treatments in which both eggs and sperm are handled. In general, ART procedures involve surgically removing eggs from a woman's ovaries, combining them with sperm in the laboratory, and returning them to the woman's body or donating them to another woman." According to CDC, "they do not include treatments in which only sperm are handled (i.e., intrauterine—or artificial—insemination) or procedures in which a woman takes medicine only to stimulate egg production without the intention of having eggs retrieved."

In Europe, ART also excludes artificial insemination and includes only procedures where oocytes are handled.

The World Health Organization (WHO) also defines ART this way.

=== Ovulation induction ===
Ovulation induction is usually used in the sense of stimulation of the development of ovarian follicles by fertility medication to reverse anovulation or oligoovulation. These medications are given by injection for 8 to 14 days. A health care provider closely monitors the development of the eggs using transvaginal ultrasound and blood tests to assess follicle growth and estrogen production by the ovaries. When follicles have reached an adequate size and the eggs are mature enough, an injection of the hormone hCG initiates the ovulation process. Egg retrieval should occur 36 hours before ovulation.

=== In vitro fertilization ===
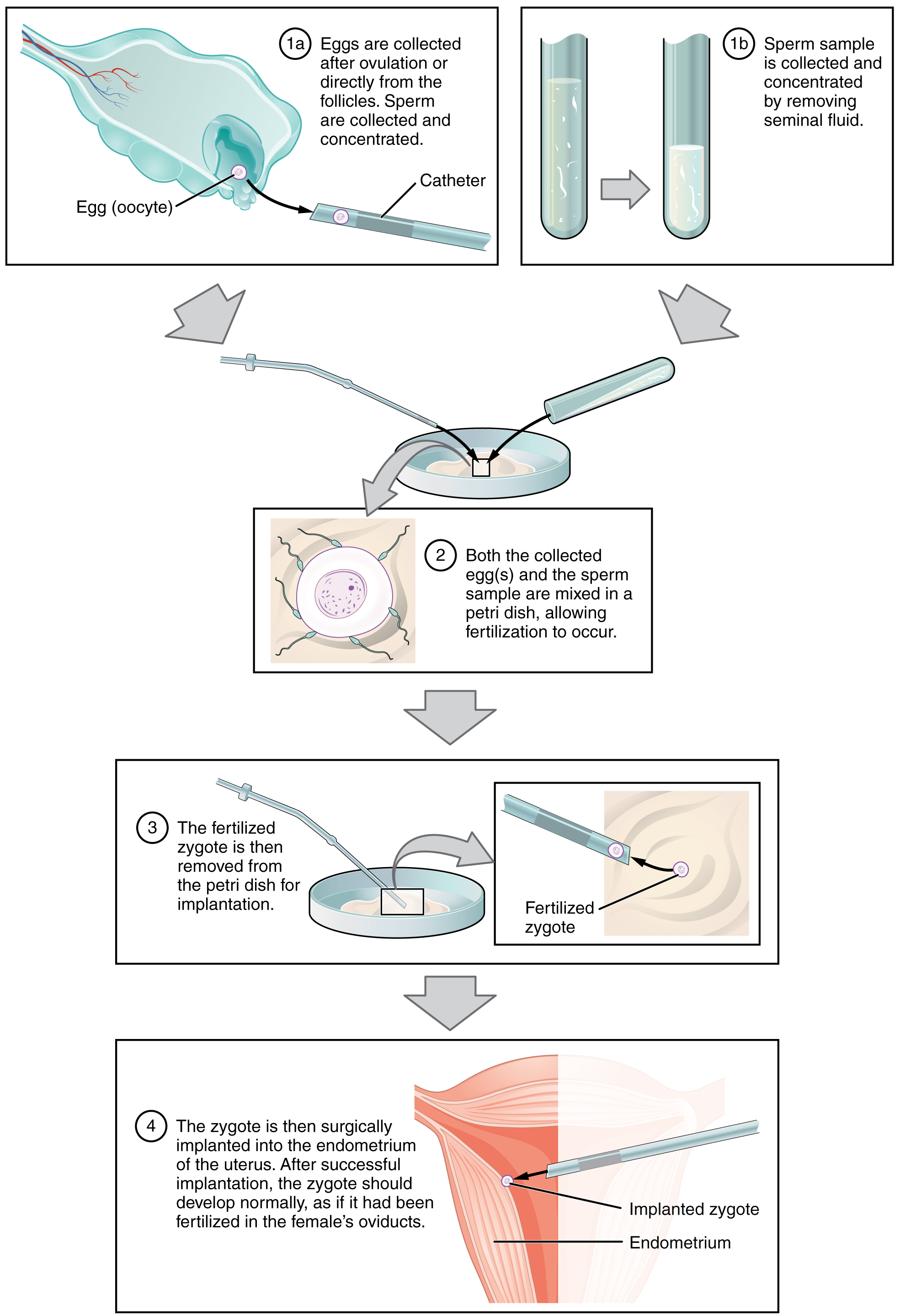
Steps of IVF Treatment

In vitro fertilization is the technique of letting fertilization of the male and female gametes (sperm and egg) occur outside the female body.

Techniques usually used in in vitro fertilization include:

- Transvaginal ovum retrieval (OVR) is the process whereby a small needle is inserted through the back of the vagina and guided via ultrasound into the ovarian follicles to collect the fluid that contains the eggs.
- Embryo transfer is the step in the process whereby one or several embryos are placed into the uterus of the female with the intent to establish a pregnancy.

Less commonly used techniques in in vitro fertilization are:

- Assisted zona hatching (AZH) is performed shortly before the embryo is transferred to the uterus. A small opening is made in the outer layer surrounding the egg in order to help the embryo hatch out and aid in the implantation process of the growing embryo.
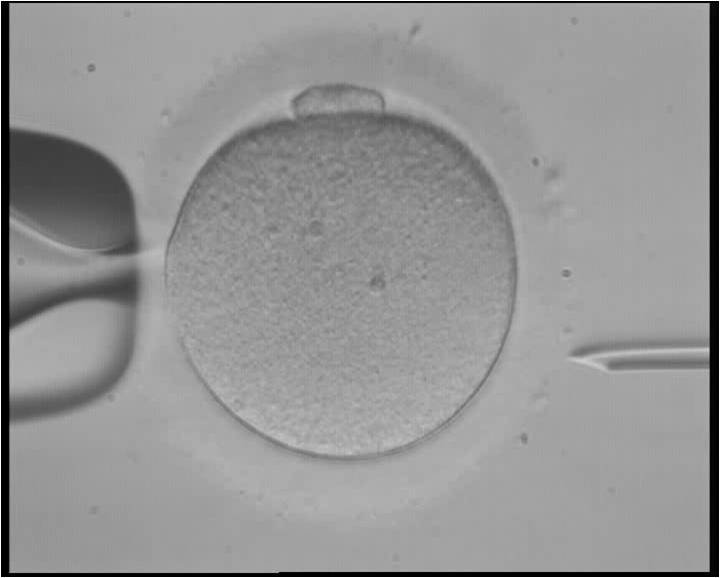
- Intracytoplasmic sperm injection (ICSI)
  Intracytoplasmic sperm injection (ICSI) is beneficial in the case of male factor infertility where sperm counts are very low or failed fertilization occurred with previous IVF attempt(s). The ICSI procedure involves a single sperm carefully injected into the center of an egg using a microneedle. With ICSI, only one sperm per egg is needed. Without ICSI, you need between 50,000 and 100,000. This method is also sometimes employed when donor sperm is used.
- Autologous endometrial coculture is a possible treatment for patients who have failed previous IVF attempts or who have poor embryo quality. The patient's fertilized eggs are placed on top of a layer of cells from the patient's own uterine lining, creating a more natural environment for embryo development.
- In zygote intrafallopian transfer (ZIFT), egg cells are removed from the woman's ovaries and fertilized in the laboratory; the resulting zygote is then placed into the fallopian tube.
- Cytoplasmic transfer is the technique in which the contents of a fertile egg from a donor are injected into the infertile egg of the patient along with the sperm.
- Egg donors are resources for women with no eggs due to surgery, chemotherapy, or genetic causes; or with poor egg quality, previously unsuccessful IVF cycles, or advanced maternal age. In the egg donor process, eggs are retrieved from a donor's ovaries, fertilized in the laboratory with the sperm from the recipient's partner, and the resulting healthy embryos are returned to the recipient's uterus.
- Sperm donation may provide the source for the sperm used in IVF procedures where the male partner produces no sperm or has an inheritable disease, or where the woman being treated has no male partner.
- Preimplantation genetic diagnosis (PGD) involves the use of genetic screening mechanisms such as fluorescent in-situ hybridization (FISH) or comparative genomic hybridization (CGH) to help identify genetically abnormal embryos and improve healthy outcomes.
- Embryo splitting can be used for twinning to increase the number of available embryos.

=== Pre-implantation genetic diagnosis ===
A pre-implantation genetic diagnosis procedure may be conducted on embryos before implantation (as a form of embryo profiling), and sometimes even of oocytes before fertilization. PGD is considered similar to prenatal diagnosis. PGD is an adjunct to ART procedures and requires in vitro fertilization to obtain oocytes or embryos for evaluation. Embryos are generally obtained through blastomere or blastocyst biopsy. The latter technique has proved to be less deleterious for the embryo; it is advisable to perform the biopsy around day 5 or 6 of development. Sex selection is the attempt to control the sex of offspring to achieve a desired sex in case of X chromosome-linked diseases. It can be accomplished in several ways, both pre- and post-implantation of an embryo, as well as at birth. Pre-implantation techniques include PGD, but also sperm sorting.

=== Others ===
Other assisted reproduction techniques include:

- Mitochondrial replacement therapy (MRT, sometimes called mitochondrial donation) is the replacement of mitochondria in one or more cells to prevent or ameliorate disease. MRT originated as a special form of IVF in which some or all of the future baby's mitochondrial DNA comes from a third party. This technique is used in cases when mothers carry genes for mitochondrial diseases. The therapy is approved for use in the United Kingdom.
- In gamete intrafallopian transfer (GIFT), a mixture of sperm and eggs is placed directly into a woman's fallopian tubes using laparoscopy following a transvaginal ovum retrieval.
- Reproductive surgery, treating e.g. fallopian tube obstruction and vas deferens obstruction, or reversing a vasectomy by a reverse vasectomy. In surgical sperm retrieval (SSR), the reproductive urologist obtains sperm from the vas deferens, epididymis, or directly from the testis in a short outpatient procedure.
- By cryopreservation, eggs, sperm, and reproductive tissue can be preserved for later IVF.

== Risks ==
The most common treatment-related complication of ART is multiple pregnancies, which carry higher risks of adverse outcomes, including preterm birth and low birth weight. Best practices for IVF have been revised to discourage the transfer of multiple embryos in favor of elective single embryo transfer (eSET) policies. This has led to reductions in the global incidence of both multiple pregnancies and pre-term births resulting from IVF. ART also carries a risk for heterotopic pregnancy (simultaneous intrauterine and extrauterine pregnancy).

Those using artificial reproductive technology are at an increased risk for medical complications that can affect both the mother and baby, including hypertension, gestational diabetes mellitus, pre-eclampsia, placental disorders, pre-term delivery, and caesarean delivery. Evidence suggests that women who conceive using ART often have preexisting underlying risk factors that increase their likelihood of developing cardiovascular diseases and vascular complications (acute kidney injury, arrhythmia, ischemic stroke, and venous thromboembolism). Medical complications are associated with significant economic and clinical impacts for both maternal and neonatal health services.

The vast majority of IVF-conceived infants are free from birth defects. However, a meta-analysis of studies from multiple countries indicates that children conceived via assisted reproductive technology do have a slightly higher risk of birth defects (1.22 times) compared to children born after natural pregnancy. Cardiovascular defects were the most strongly associated type of birth defect. Orofacial, central nervous system, urogenital and musculoskeletal defects were also more likely to occur.

The reasons for increased risk of birth defects are unclear. There may be risks associated with ICSI and IVF-ET operating procedures. There may also be contributing underlying factors among patients, such as parental age, obesity, parental fertility, gamete quality, or exposure to environmental pollution.

Several meta-analyses have indicated that children born as a result of IVF are roughly twice as likely to have cerebral palsy than those conceived naturally. When the occurrence of multiple births is taken into account, and single-pregnancy outcomes are compared, the increased risk of cerebral palsy decreases but is still present.

De novo mutations (DNMs) are spontaneous genetic alterations that occur in the germline or during early embryonic development. The frequency of de novo mutations increases progressively with the age of parents at the time of conception, with an increase of approximately 1.35 to 1.5 DNMs for each additional year of paternal age and a smaller increase of 0.24 to 0.42 for each additional year of maternal age. Sperm DNA damage may therefore be a key factor affecting the development of early embryos. Oocytes are capable of efficient DNA repair, while sperm lack this ability. Studies of the possible effects of assisted reproductive technology on the frequency of de novo mutations have yielded conflicting results. Some studies report negative effects of ART while others find no effects. The impact of ART on the likelihood of DNMs may be less important than those due to parental aging and environmental factors.

Pregnancies involving oocyte donation or sperm donation may have lower risks. Genetic screening is normally performed to exclude donors with chromosome abnormalities, and the age of donors is often restricted.

A 2025 meta-analysis did not find evidence to link assisted reproductive technology (ART) with childhood cancer. A landmark paper by Jacques Balayla et al. reported that infants born after ART have similar neurodevelopment to infants born after natural conception.

Studies show that women and men who are being treated for infertility tend to experience increases in stress and sexual dysfunction as well as reductions in relationship satisfaction. Studies do not indicate an increased risk of postpartum depression (PPD) among women who become pregnant after using ART. Some studies actually report a lower risk of PPD and lower levels of depression and anxiety among women during pregnancy.

LGBTQ people can face additional barriers and risks during their use of assisted reproductive technology.

== Usage ==
As a result of the 1992 Fertility Clinic Success Rate and Certification Act, the CDC is required to publish the annual ART success rates at U.S. fertility clinics. Assisted reproductive technology procedures performed in the U.S. has over than doubled over the last 10 years, with 140,000 procedures in 2006, resulting in 55,000 births.

In Australia, 3.1% of births in the late 2000's are a result of ART.

The most common reasons for discontinuation of fertility treatment have been estimated to be: postponement of treatment (39%), physical and psychological burden (19%), psychological burden (14%), physical burden (6.32%), relational and personal problems (17%), personal reasons (9%), relational problems (9%), treatment rejection (13%) and organizational (12%) and clinic (8%) problems.

== By country ==
=== United States ===
Many Americans do not have insurance coverage for fertility investigations and treatments. Many states are starting to mandate coverage, and the rate of use is 278% higher in states with complete coverage.

Some health insurance companies cover the diagnosis of infertility, but once diagnosed, they frequently will not cover any treatment costs.

Approximate treatment/diagnosis costs in the United States, with inflation, as of 2025 (US$):

- Initial workup: hysteroscopy, hysterosalpingogram, blood tests ~$3,300
- Sonohysterogram (SHG) ~ $990–$1,600
- Clomiphene citrate cycle ~ $330–$820
- IVF cycle ~ $16,500–$49,500
- Use of a surrogate mother to carry the child, dependent on arrangements

Another way to look at costs is to determine the expected cost of establishing a pregnancy. Thus, if a clomiphene treatment has a chance to establish a pregnancy in 8% of cycles and costs $820, the expected cost is $9,900 to establish a pregnancy, compared to an IVF cycle (cycle fecundity 40%) with a corresponding expected cost of $49,500 ($19,800 × 40%).

For the community as a whole, the cost of IVF on average pays back by 700% by tax from future employment by the conceived human being.

=== European Union ===
Number of assisted reproductive technology cycles in Europe between 1997 and 2014

In Europe, 157,500 children were born using assisted reproductive technology in 2015, according to the European Society of Human Reproduction and Embryology (ESHRE). But there are major differences in legislation across the Old Continent. A European directive fixes standards concerning the use of human tissue and cells, but all ethical and legal questions on ART remain the prerogative of EU member states.

Conditions of assisted reproductive technology in different European countries: ART authorized for lesbian couples ART authorized for single women ART authorized for single women and lesbian couples ART prohibited for single women and lesbian couples

Across Europe, the legal criteria for availability vary somewhat. In 11 countries all women may benefit; in 8 others only heterosexual couples are concerned; in 7 only single women; and in 2 (Austria and Germany) only lesbian couples. Spain was the first European country to open ART to all women, in 1977, the year the first sperm bank was opened there. In France, the right to ART has been accorded to all women since 2019. In the last 15 years, legislation has evolved quickly. For example, Portugal made ART available in 2006 with conditions very similar to those in France, before amending the law in 2016 to allow lesbian couples and single women to benefit. Italy clarified its uncertain legal situation in 2004 by adopting Europe's strictest laws: ART is only available to heterosexual couples, married or otherwise, and sperm donation is prohibited.

Today, 21 countries provide partial public funding for ART treatment. The seven others, which do not, are Ireland, Cyprus, Estonia, Latvia, Luxembourg, Malta, and Romania. Such subsidies are subject to conditions, however. In Belgium, a fixed payment of €1,073 is made for each IVF cycle process. The woman must be aged under 43 and may not carry out more than six cycles of ART. There is also a limit on the number of transferable embryos, which varies according to age and the number of cycles completed. In France, ART is subsidized in full by national health insurance for women up to age 43, with limits of 4 attempts at IVF and 6 at artificial insemination. Germany tightened its conditions for public funding in 2004, which caused a sharp drop in the number of ART cycles carried out, from more than 102,000 in 2003 to fewer than 57,000 the following year. Since then, the figure has remained stable.

17 countries limit access to ART according to the age of the woman. 10 countries have established an upper age limit, varying from 40 (Finland, Netherlands) to 50 (including Spain, Greece, and Estonia). Since 1994, France has been one of several countries (including Germany, Spain, and the UK) that use the somewhat vague notion of "natural age of procreation". In 2017, the steering council of France's Agency of Biomedicine established an age limit of 43 for women using ART. 10 countries have no age limit for ART. These include Austria, Hungary, Italy and Poland.

Most European countries allow donations of gametes by third parties. But the situations vary depending on whether sperm or eggs are concerned. Sperm donations are authorized in 20 EU member states; in 11 of them, anonymity is allowed. Egg donations are possible in 17 states, including 8 under anonymous conditions. On 12 April, the Council of Europe adopted a recommendation which encourages an end to anonymity. In the UK, anonymous sperm donations ended in 2005, and children have access to the identity of the donor when they reach adulthood. In France, the principle of anonymous donations of sperm or embryos is maintained in the law of bioethics of 2011, but a new bill under discussion may change the situation.

=== United Kingdom ===
In the United Kingdom, all patients have the right to preliminary testing, provided free of charge by the National Health Service (NHS). However, treatment is not widely available on the NHS, and there can be long waiting lists. Many patients, therefore, pay for immediate treatment within the NHS or seek help from private clinics.

In 2013, the National Institute for Health and Care Excellence (NICE) published new guidelines about who should have access to IVF treatment on the NHS in England and Wales.

The guidelines say women aged between 40 and 42 should be offered one cycle of IVF on the NHS if they have never had IVF treatment before, have no evidence of low ovarian reserve (this is when eggs in the ovary are low in number, or low in quality), and have been informed of the additional implications of IVF and pregnancy at this age. However, if tests show IVF is the only treatment likely to help them get pregnant, women should be referred for IVF straight away.

This policy is often modified by local Clinical Commissioning Groups, in a fairly blatant breach of the NHS Constitution for England, which provides that patients have the right to drugs and treatments that have been recommended by NICE for use in the NHS. For example, the Cheshire, Merseyside and West Lancashire Clinical Commissioning Group insists on additional conditions:

- The person undergoing treatment must have commenced treatment before her 40th birthday;
- The person undergoing treatment must have a BMI of between 19 and 29;
- Neither partner must have any living children from either the current or previous relationships. This includes adopted as well as biological children; and,
- Sub-fertility must not be the direct result of a sterilisation procedure in either partner (this does not include conditions where sterilisation occurs as a result of another medical problem). Couples who have undertaken a reversal of their sterilisation procedure are not eligible for treatment.

=== Canada ===
Some treatments are covered by OHIP (public health insurance) in Ontario, and others are not. Women with bilaterally blocked fallopian tubes and are under the age of 40 have treatment covered, but are still required to pay test fees (around CA$3,000–4,000). Coverage varies in other provinces. Most other patients are required to pay for treatments themselves.

=== Germany ===
On 27 January 2009, the Federal Constitutional Court ruled that it is unconstitutional, that the health insurance companies have to bear only 50% of the cost for IVF. On 2 March 2012, the Federal Council has approved a draft law of some federal states, which provides that the federal government provides a subsidy of 25% to the cost. Thus, the share of costs borne for the pair would drop to just 25%. Since July 2017, assisted reproductive technology is also allowed for married lesbian couples, as German parliament allowed same-sex marriages in Germany.

=== France ===
In July 2020, the French Parliament allowed assisted reproductive technology also for lesbian couples and single women.

=== Cuba ===
Cuban sources mention that assisted reproduction is completely legal and free in the country.

=== India ===
The Government of India has notified the Surrogacy (Regulation) Act 2021 and the Assisted Reproductive Technology (Regulation) Act 2021 to regulate the practice of ART. Before that, the National Guidelines for Accreditation, Supervision and Regulation of ART Clinics in India, published by the Ministry for Health and Family Welfare, Government of India in 2005, governed the field. Indian law recognises the right of a single woman, who is a major, to have children through ART.

=== Switzerland ===
In Switzerland, since July 1, 2022, same-sex marriage has provided children of lesbian couples, one of whom is infertile, with the emotional and financial support of both parents. However, the difference in treatment based on sex, this enshrines, could be further exacerbated by access to assisted reproductive technologies (ART) for single individuals. Reconsidering the framework for ART, previously reserved for couples, would also represent an additional financial burden for municipalities, as child support payments prevent the financial burden of single-parent families from being transferred to public authorities. Indeed, genetic tests conducted in paternity cases are not solely intended to allow the child to learn the identity of his biological father, but primarily serve to justify the child support payments that a reluctant father will have to make. (Note: In Switzerland, when adding up direct and indirect expenses, the cost of a child for his or her family amounts to almost one million Swiss francs.)

In September 2025, the Federal Council announced its intention to amend family law to adapt it to the situation of parents who have used ART abroad. The ban on egg donation and surrogacy in Switzerland generates problematic reproductive tourism, as many intended parents circumvent the law by going abroad. In practice, for the child's own well-being, the child is rarely removed from its intended parents. According to Samia Hurst, it would be possible to guarantee the rights of surrogate mothers by increasing the number of parents a child can have through the adoption of a three-parent model that includes two intended parents and the mother. (Note: In Switzerland, a more restrictive approach to access to surrogacy, egg donation, and sperm donation could be considered, with reimbursement by the Swiss health insurance system (LAMal) limited to cases of infertility due to medical problems, such as disorders of sexual differentiation. Thus, individuals with complete androgen insensitivity syndrome, a congenital condition involving the absence of a uterus and the inability to produce gametes (sperm or eggs), could either benefit from egg donation and surrogacy if they are in a relationship with an individual producing male reproductive cells, or allow their partner to have access to sperm donation if they are engaged in a relationship with an individual capable to become pregnant (a cisgender woman or a transgender man).)

== Society and culture ==
=== Ethics ===
In theory, ART can solve almost all reproductive problems, except for severe pathology or the absence of a uterus (or womb), using specific gamete or embryo donation techniques. However, this does not mean that all women can be treated with assisted reproductive techniques, or that all women who are treated will achieve pregnancy.

The increasing use of ART by older individuals, facilitated by techniques such as elective oocyte cryopreservation (commonly known as "social freezing"), raises significant socio-ethical questions. While often framed as a tool for enhancing reproductive autonomy by allowing individuals to delay childbearing for personal or professional reasons, this practice is subject to ethical debate. Proponents argue it empowers women by providing greater biological control. However, critics warn it may medicalize a social problem—the difficulty of balancing career and family—and create pressure for women to use this technology. Furthermore, it presents a potential ethical challenge regarding the welfare of the future child, as some studies suggest that children of significantly older parents may face unique psychosocial challenges, including a higher probability of losing parents at a younger age. This has sparked complex debates in clinical ethics about the balance between reproductive rights and the potential interests of the child.

Some couples may find it difficult to stop treatment despite very bad prognoses, resulting in futile therapies. This has the potential to give ART providers a difficult decision of whether to continue or refuse treatment.

Cultural and religious views may influence people's views on infertility and can increase distress and conflict. When working with individuals and communities, awareness of cultural and religious values and needs can help to make interfility services more accessible.

=== Fictional representation ===
Films and other fiction depicting emotional struggles of assisted reproductive technology have had an upswing in the latter part of the 2000s, although the techniques have been available for decades. As ART becomes more utilized, the number of people who can relate to it by personal experience in one way or another is growing.

For specific examples, refer to the fiction sections in individual subarticles, e.g. surrogacy, sperm donation and fertility clinic.

In addition, reproduction and pregnancy in speculative fiction has been present for many decades.

== Historical facts ==
25 July 1978, Louise Brown was born; this was the first successful birth of a child after IVF treatment. The procedure took place at Dr Kershaw's Cottage Hospital (now Dr Kershaw's Hospice) in Royton, Oldham, England. Patrick Steptoe (gynaecologist) and Robert Edwards (physiologist) worked together to develop the IVF technique. Steptoe described a new method of egg extraction and Edwards were carrying out a way to fertilise eggs in the lab. Robert G. Edwards was awarded the Nobel Prize in Physiology or Medicine in 2010, but not Steptoe because the Nobel Prize is not awarded posthumously.

The first successful birth by ICSI (intracytoplasmic sperm injection) took place on 14 January 1992. The technique was developed by Gianpiero D. Palermo at the Vrije Universiteit Brussel, in the Center for Reproductive Medicine in Brussels. Actually, the discovery was made by mistake when a spermatozoid was put into the cytoplasm.

== See also ==
- Artificial uterus
- Artificial insemination
- Fertility fraud
- Human cloning
- Ova bank
- Posthumous birth
- Sperm bank
- Sperm donation
- Spontaneous conception, the unassisted conception of a subsequent child after prior use of assisted reproductive technology
- Egg donation
- Ralph L. Brinster
- Religious response to ART
- Repository for Germinal Choice
