= American Planning Association =

Professional organization representing the field of urban planning in the United States

- Abbreviation: APA
- Formation: 1978; 48 years ago
- Merger of: American Institute of Planners; American Society of Planning Officials
- Type: Non-profit 501(c)(3) educational organization
- Purpose: To provide leadership in the development of vital communities
- Headquarters: 205 N. Michigan Ave., Suite 1200, Chicago, Illinois, U.S.
- President: Kurt E. Christiansen, FAICP
- Past President: Cynthia Bowen, FAICP
- Board of directors: Kurt E Christiansen, FAICP, President; Cynthia Bowen, FAICP, Past President; Deborah Lawlor, FAICP, AICP President; Courtenay Mercer, AICP, Director Region I; Rodger Lentz, AICP, Director Region II; Wendy Shabay, AICP, Director Region III; Wendy Moeller, FAICP, Director Region IV; Leo Asuncion Jr., AICP, Director Region V; Kristen Asp, AICP, Director Region VI; Kara Drane, AICP, Director At Large; Lauren Driscoll, AICP, Director At Large; Marjorie Press, Director At Large, Focused; Fleming El-Amin, AICP, Director At Large, Focused; Ben Hitchings, FAICP, Advisor to Board, CPC Chair; David Fields, AICP, Advisor to Board, Divisions Chair; Rachael Thompson Panik, Advisor to Board, SRC Chair
- Key people: Joel Albizo (CEO and executive director)
- Subsidiaries: American Institute of Certified Planners (AICP)
- Affiliations: 47 member chapters (2014)
- Website: planning.org

The American Planning Association (APA) is a professional organization representing the field of urban planning in the United States. APA was formed in 1978, when two separate professional planning organizations, the American Institute of Planners and the American Society of Planning Officials, were merged into a single organization. The American Institute of Certified Planners is now the organization's professional branch. Its headquarters is in Chicago, Illinois.

== Functions ==
The main function of the American Planning Association is to serve as a forum for the exchange of ideas between people who work in the field of urban planning. The organization keeps track of the various improvement efforts underway around the country, which may include the improvement or construction of new parks, highways and roads, or residential developments. The organization is also a starting point for people looking for employment.

The association also publishes the Journal of the American Planning Association (JAPA, ISSN 0194-4363). JAPA was founded in 1935 as Planners' Journal, and was from 1943 known as Journal of the American Institute of Planners (ISSN 0002-8991).

== National Planning Conference ==
The American Planning Association holds an annual national conference that attracts planners, local government officials, planning commissioners, advocates and planning students from across the United States, Canada and the world. Each conference hosts several hundred individual sessions with thousands of attendees.

== Chapters ==
The association has 47 state/regional chapters, such as NJAPA, the New Jersey chapter of APA and the Western Central Chapter of the APA. APA members in the United States are required to belong to a local chapter. Many APA Chapters meet regularly, and most are a source for local conferences and education, networking. Each of 47 local chapters publishes a newsletter and maintains a presence on the web and on social media.

== Divisions ==
To manage the various interests of American planners, APA has 21 divisions. APA divisions offer professional networking opportunities for planners. They also produce newsletters and special publications, develop conference sessions, collaborate with related organizations, and contribute to policy work.
