= A T.I.M.E. =

US non-profit organization

- A Torah Infertility Medium of Exchange
- Formation: 1993
- Founder: Rabbi Shaul; Brany Rosen
- Type: Non-profit organization
- Website: www.atime.org

ATIME (A Torah Infertility Medium of Exchange), a New York-based non-profit for is an organization founded to help supporting Jewish couples as they navigate the intricate challenges of fertility, reproductive health, and loss. ATIME offers a range of services that blend practical support, encouragement, and religious sensitivity. By addressing each stage of the journey with empathy and precision, ATIME was created to empower couples to move foward with clarity, strength, and hope.

== History ==
A TIME was established in Brooklyn, New York, in 1993 by Rabbi Shaul and Brany Rosen, a Bobov Chassidic couple as a social support network for Jewish couples experiencing infertility.

Currently, the organization has over 7,700 registered members and branch offices operate in the United States, Canada, England and Israel.

== Services ==
The organization offers services including: social support forums for couples, coordinating resources for financial aid for treatments, educational programs, physician referrals, adoption services, and a pregnancy loss support program. The organization also publishes a quarterly magazine that includes up-to-date information on the latest fertility technologies.

== See also ==
- Bonei Olam
- Religious response to ART
- Puah Institute
