= Religious response to assisted reproductive technology =

Challenges for traditional communities

Religious response to assisted reproductive technology deals with the new challenges for traditional social and religious communities raised by modern assisted reproductive technology. Because many religious communities have strong opinions and religious legislation regarding marriage, sex and reproduction, modern fertility technology has forced religions to respond.

== Sperm collection ==
Both for male factor testing and in order to use sperm for intrauterine insemination or in vitro fertilization the couple must first collect a sperm sample. For many religious groups this creates a challenge due to a prohibition on masturbation.

== Christianity ==
Christian Churches have different views on the use of assisted reproductive technology.

=== Catholicism ===
The Catholic Church opposes certain types of assisted reproductive technology and artificial birth control since they separate the procreative goal of marital sex from the goal of uniting married couples. The Catholic Church permits the use of a small number of reproductive technologies and pregnancy postponement methods like natural family planning, which involves charting ovulation times.

The church allows other forms of reproductive technologies that allow conception to take place from normative sexual intercourse, such as a fertility lubricant, the use of hormonal injections to grow follicles and assist in ovulation, and intrauterine insemination with sperm collected using the approved method of collection during intercourse.

More recently, some Catholic authors have seen the Creighton Model FertilityCare System, a technique based on the search for the restoration of fertility as a way to obtain a natural conception, as a morally licit alternative to other assisted reproduction techniques such as IVF.

==== In vitro fertilization ====
Pope Benedict XVI publicly reemphasized the Catholic Church's opposition to in vitro fertilization, claiming it separates the unitive procreative actions that characterize the sexual embrace. In addition, the church opposes in vitro fertilization because it might cause disposal of embryos; Catholics believe an embryo is an individual with a soul who must be treated as a such. In addition, when it comes to the embryos, cryofreezing them for later use is frowned upon by the Catholic Church because it is considered immoral.

This particular doctrine, often expounded by the magisterium of the Church, is based on the inseparable connection, established by God, which man on his own initiative may not break, between the unitive significance and the procreative significance which are both inherent to the marriage act. The reason is that the fundamental nature of the marriage act, while uniting husband and wife in the closest intimacy, also renders them capable of generating new life—and this as a result of laws written into the actual nature of man and of woman. And if each of these essential qualities, the unitive and the procreative, is preserved, the use of marriage fully retains its sense of true mutual love and its ordination to the supreme responsibility of parenthood to which man is called. We believe that our contemporaries are particularly capable of seeing that this teaching is in harmony with human reason.

According to the Catechism of the Catholic Church,

Techniques involving only the married couple (homologous artificial insemination and fertilization) are perhaps less reprehensible, yet remain morally unacceptable. They dissociate the sexual act from the procreative act. The act which brings the child into existence is no longer an act by which two persons give themselves to one another, but one that "entrusts the life and identity of the embryo into the power of doctors and biologists and establishes the domination of technology over the origin and destiny of the human person. Such a relationship of domination is in itself contrary to the dignity and equality that must be common to parents and children."

The Catholic Church maintains that it is not objectively evil to be infertile, and advocates adoption as an option for such couples who still wish to have children:

The Gospel shows that physical sterility is not an absolute evil. Spouses who still suffer from infertility after exhausting legitimate medical procedures should unite themselves with the Lord's Cross, the source of all spiritual fecundity. They can give expression to their generosity by adopting abandoned children or performing demanding services for others.

==== Gamete intrafallopian transfer ====
Gamete intrafallopian transfer (GIFT) is not technically in vitro fertilisation because with GIFT, fertilisation takes place inside the body, not on a Petri dish. The Catholic Church has no official stance on GIFT and says that couples can make their own decision on whether to use it or reject it, though there is debate among Catholic theologians as to whether it should be considered permissible assistance or an immoral replacement to sex.

=== Lutheranism ===
The Lutheran Council in the United States of America, organized by the Lutheran Church–Missouri Synod and parent bodies of the Evangelical Lutheran Church in America, produced an authoritative document on the issue of in-vitro fertilisation, which "unanimously concluded that in vitro fertilization does not in and of itself violate the will of God as reflected in the Bible, when the wife's egg and husband's sperm are used" (LCUSA n.d.:31).

The Lutheran Churches approve of artificial insemination by a husband (AIH), though representatives from the Lutheran Church-Missouri Synod hold that such IVF is only unobjectionable if the sperm and egg come from husband and wife and all of the fertilized eggs are implanted in the womb of the wife. With regard to artificial insemination by a donor (AID), the Evangelical Lutheran Church in America teaches that it is a "cause for moral concern", while the Lutheran Church–Missouri Synod rejects it.

=== Anglicanism ===
The Episcopal Church approved the use of in vitro fertilisation in its General Convention in 1982; though it approved artificial insemination by a husband (AIH), in the General Convention of 1988 it declared "artificial insemination by donor problematic".

=== Methodism ===
For couples considering in-vitro fertilisation, the United Methodist Church in its Book of Resolutions states:

- We call for rigorous standards of informed consent regarding the procedures, the physical and emotional risks, and the associated ethical issues be applied to all reproductive technologies.
- We urge clinicians and couples to make the determination of how many eggs to fertilize and implant on a case-by-case basis.

With regard to the remaining embryos after in vitro fertilization procedures, the United Methodist Church teaches:

The United Methodist Church supports persons who wish to enhance medical research by donating their early embryos remaining after in vitro fertilization procedures have ended, and urges national governments to pass legislation that would authorize funding for derivation of and medical research on human embryonic stem cells that were generated from in vitro fertilization embryos and remain after fertilization procedures have been concluded, provided that:

1. these early embryos are no longer required for procreation by those donating them and would simply be discarded;
2. those donating early embryos have given their prior informed consent to their use in stem cell research;
3. the embryos were not deliberately created for research purposes; and
4. the embryos were not obtained by sale or purchase.

National health agencies are urged to establish an interdisciplinary oversight body for all research in both the public and private sectors that involves stem cells from human embryos, adult stem cells that have been made pluripotent, parthenotes, sperm cells, or egg cells, and cells that produce sperm or eggs.

=== The Church of Jesus Christ of Latter-day Saints ===
The Church of Jesus Christ of Latter-day Saints policy states:

"The pattern of a husband and wife providing bodies for God's spirit children is divinely appointed (see 2.1.3). When needed, reproductive technology can assist a married woman and man in their righteous desire to have children. This technology includes artificial insemination and in vitro fertilization.
"The Church discourages artificial insemination or in vitro fertilization using sperm from anyone but the husband or an egg from anyone but the wife. However, this is a personal matter that is ultimately left to the judgment and prayerful consideration of a lawfully married man and woman."

== Hinduism ==
Hinduism is generally tolerant of assisted reproductive technology with several people in Hindu mythology who have been born without intercourse including Karna and Five Pandavas. Additionally, infertility is often associated with karma in the Hindu tradition and consequently treated as a pathology to be treated. This has led to general acceptance of medical intervention for addressing infertility amongst Hindus. As such, surrogacy and other scientific methods of assisted reproduction are generally supported within the Hindu community. Nonetheless, Hindu women do not commonly use surrogacy as an option to treat infertility, despite often serving as surrogates for Western commissioning couples. When surrogacy is practiced by Hindus, it is more likely to be used within the family circle as opposed to involving anonymous donors.

== Islam ==
The Islamic community, after the fatwa on assisted reproductive technology by Gad al-Haq of Egypt's Al-Azhar University, largely accepted assisted reproductive technology.

In vitro fertilization and similar technologies are permissible as long as they do not involve any form of third-party donation (of sperm, eggs, embryos, or uteruses). Regarding third-party donation there is a debate between Sunni Islam and Shi'a Islam. Sunnis, following the al-Azhar fatwa, do not allow third-party donations. In 1999, Ali Khamenei, the authority for his followers, issued a fatwa stating that it was permitted to use third-party donors.

The conclusions of Gad al-Haq's assisted reproductive technology fatwa are as follows:

1. Artificial insemination with the husband's semen is allowed, and the resulting child is the legal offspring of the couple.
2. In vitro fertilization of an egg from the wife with the sperm of her husband and the transfer of the fertilized egg back to the uterus of the wife is allowed, provided that the procedure is indicated for a medical reason and is carried out by an expert physician.
3. Since marriage is a contract between the wife and husband during the span of their marriage, no third party should intrude into the marital functions of sex and procreation. This means that a third party donor is not acceptable, whether he or she is providing sperm, eggs, embryos, or a uterus. The use of a third party is tantamount to zina, or adultery.
4. Adoption of a child from an illegitimate form of medically assisted conception is not allowed. The child who results from a forbidden method belongs to the mother who delivered him/her. He or she is considered to be a laqid, or an illegitimate child.
5. If the marriage contract has come to an end because of divorce or death of the husband, medically assisted conception cannot be performed on the ex-wife even if the sperm comes from the former husband.
6. An excess number of embryos can be preserved by cryopreservation. The frozen embryos are the property of the couple alone and may be transferred to the same wife in a successive cycle, but only during the duration of the marriage contract. Embryo donation is prohibited.
7. Selective reduction is only allowed if the prospect of carrying the pregnancy to viability is very small. It is also allowed if the health or life of the mother is in jeopardy.
8. All forms of surrogacy are forbidden.
9. Establishment of sperm banks with "selective" semen threatens the existence of the family and the "race" and should be prevented.
10. The physician is the only qualified person to practice medically assisted conception in all its permitted varieties. If he performs any of the forbidden techniques, he is guilty, his earnings are forbidden, and he must be stopped from his morally illicit practice.

== Judaism ==
Defining Jewish views on assisted reproductive technology based solely on branches of Judaism is problematic since there is substantial overlap in opinions and moral authority.

=== Orthodox Judaism ===
Within the Orthodox Jewish community the concept is debated as there is little precedent in traditional Jewish legal textual sources. Non-legal sources such as medrash and aggadah provide stories that have been used to draw conclusions regarding assisted reproductive technology by modern Jewish legal decisors. In general, traditional Judaism views medical intervention positively. Regarding assisted reproductive technology, the positive view of medicine is challenged by the Jewish religious legal system which has numerous laws regarding modesty and sexuality and a strong emphasis on verifiable lineage.

In Orthodox Judaism, insemination with the husband's sperm is permissible if the wife cannot become pregnant in any other way.

Regarding laws of sexuality, religious challenges include masturbation (which may be regarded as "seed wasting"), laws related to sexual activity and menstruation (niddah) and the specific laws regarding intercourse. Additional issues arise regarding the restrictions of the Sabbath (Shabbat) and Jewish holidays.

An additional major issue is that of establishing paternity and lineage. For a baby conceived naturally, the father's identity is determined by a legal presumption (chazakah) of legitimacy: rov bi'ot achar ha'baal - a woman's sexual relations are assumed to be with her husband. Regarding an in vitro fertilization child, this assumption does not exist and as such Rabbi Eliezer Waldenberg (among others) requires an outside supervisor to positively identify the father. Doctors or laboratory workers present at the time of the fertility treatment are not considered supervisors due to a conflict of interest and their pre-occupation with their work.

As such, supervisory services are required for all treatments involving lab manipulation or cryopreservation of sperm, ovum or embryos.

While a range of views exist, both egg donation and surrogacy are permitted according to many Orthodox decisors, pending religious fertility supervision.

Those interested are recommended to contact their local Orthodox or Hasidic Rabbi, as these laws are obviously complicated, and as is customary.

=== Conservative Judaism ===
The official halachic legal authority for American Conservative Judaism is the Rabbinical Assembly's Committee on Jewish Law and Standards. They vote on proposed responsa. A responsa may be approved by either a majority or a minority vote, and individual Rabbis may rely on even minority-approved responsa for their rulings.

Artificial insemination: AI is not typically allowed because it calls into question a variety of Jewish Laws regarding incest, adultery, and lineage. In fact, there are some Rabbis who work closely with fertilization clinics so that they can supervise all genetic material. The sperm donor is considered the father for purposes of determining the child's tribal status and for issues of ritual consanguinity, therefore, the use of anonymous donors is strongly discouraged. When it comes to adultery, there is the possibility that a man could have made multiple sperm donations. That leaves room for half-siblings to potentially meet and marry which would violate the Jewish incest laws. Lastly, you have the adultery claims. If a woman uses sperm from a man that is not her husband, some consider this to be adultery. Others, however, do not see this as an issue because both members of the couple consent to the use of third party sperm donation.

Egg donation/Surrogacy: Surrogacy and egg donation are permissible and the birth mother, rather than the genetic mother, is considered the mother of the child, therefore conversion may be necessary if a non-Jewish woman acts as a gestational surrogate. A maximum of 3 embryos may be implanted at a time. Freezing and donation of embryos is permitted.

The Conservative movement's position on "family purity" practices, reducing the amount of time after a woman's period during which she is prohibited to have sex, may also work as a pro-fertility measure. As part of its treatment of Tohorat HaMishpahah, the Conservative Assembly in 2006 accepted a position of eliminating the requirement for seven white days after the cessation of menses and establishing this as an optional custom. This is offered as a solution for women dealing with ovulation before mikvah by reducing the number of days with sexual relations being forbidden from an average of 12 to 5. Mid-cycle staining during ovulation, while ordinarily would prevent sexual relations by being considered zavah, is to be considered a result of ancillary circumstances (diet, medical treatment, physical exertion, or illness) and as such the emission is considered permissible, and the woman would not become a zavah. Drug therapies to avoid mid-cycle staining are deemed unnecessary with the risks of the drug side-effects outweighing the prohibition of zavah due to the commandment of hai bahem, ("[you shall] live by them").

=== Other movements ===
Reform Judaism has generally approved artificial insemination by donor, in-vitro fertilization and surrogate motherhood.

== See also ==
- A T.I.M.E.
- Bonei Olam
- Donum Vitae
- Puah Institute

== Bibliography ==
- Inhorn, MC (December 2006). "Making Muslim babies: IVF and gamete donation in Sunni versus Shi'a Islam". Cult Med Psychiatry. 30 (4): 427–50. doi:10.1007/s11013-006-9027-x. PMC 1705533. PMID 17051430. Archived from the original on 2009-06-24.
