= Deborah Lawlor =

British epidemiologist

- Born: Bradford
- Known for: Life course epidemiology, Reproductive health, Perinatal health, Cardio-metabolic health
- Scientific career
- Fields: Epidemiology
- Workplaces: University of Bristol
- Thesis: The epidemiology of coronary heart disease in women: the role of insulin resistance (2003)

Deborah A. Lawlor is a British epidemiologist and professor at the University of Bristol, where she is the deputy director of the Medical Research Council Integrative Epidemiology Unit. She is also a fellow of the Faculty of Public Health and of the Academy of Medical Sciences. Her main areas of research are perinatal, reproductive and cardio-metabolic health. Lawlor was awarded a CBE in the 2017 Queen's Birthday Honours for her services to social and community medicine research.

== Early life and education ==
Lawlor was born in Bradford in a house that was later demolished when the University of Bradford was built on the site. She went to St Edmund Campion comprehensive school, then studied for A-levels at St. Joseph's Catholic College.

Lawlor first trained as a medical doctor and received her MBChB from the University of Bristol in 1986. After practising medicine for several years (in the UK and abroad in Mozambique,) she became increasingly interested in medical research. Her main interests were understanding large scale determinants of health such as the effect of socio-economic inequalities, and she returned to university to study public health. She received a Masters in Public Health from the University of Leeds in 1997, and a MSc in medical statistics from the University of London in 2003. In 2003, she received a PhD in epidemiology from the University of Bristol for a thesis titled "The epidemiology of coronary heart disease in women: the role of insulin resistance".

== Career and research ==
After her PhD, Lawlor joined the Department of Social Medicine at the University of Bristol on a postdoctoral fellowship funded by the Medical Research Council. There she progressed to Professor of Epidemiology. Lawlor is also the Deputy Director of the MRC Integrative Epidemiology Unit as well as holding visiting or honorary positions with the London School of Hygiene and Tropical Medicine, the University of Bradford, King's College London, the University of Adelaide and the Harvard T.H. Chan School of Public Health.

Lawlor's research has focused on reproductive health with a particular focus on the long-term effects of pregnancy on both mother and child outcomes. In particular, her work has focused on the effects of cardio-metabolic diseases including diabetes and cardiovascular disease. She has set up a Reproductive Health theme at the National Institute for Health Research (NIHR) Biomedical Research Centre (BRC) which she leads. Her programme has one strand aiming to improve in-vitro fertilisation (IVF) success by developing an evidence base to accurately predict success and identify causes of failure. Her work has led to the development of a tool for predicting IVF outcomes in couples trying to conceive. Lawlor's theme also explores adverse perinatal, pregnancy and offspring cardio-metabolic outcomes, to enable stratified and effective antenatal care in both IVF and spontaneous conceptions.

Lawlor is also very interested in causal inference techniques in order to better inform interventions. She has published many papers outlining and using the technique of Mendelian randomisation and is an advocate for the combining of multiple methods to allow for the strongest possible causal inference.

Deborah has also published a 'negative CV' including paper and grant rejections. This includes the advice she was given at school to take less demanding Certificate of Secondary Education (CSE) examinations rather than the more demanding 'O' Level examinations, and that she should not consider university and needed to be more 'reasonable' with her expectations.

In 2021, Lawlor became the British Heart Foundation Professor of Cardiovascular Science and Clinical Epidemiology.

== Recognition ==
In 2003, Lawlor was presented with a UK Department of Health Career Scientist Award. Lawlor was elected a Fellow of the Faculty of Public Health by distinction (2006) and a Fellow of the Academy of Medical Sciences (2012). Additionally, Lawlor was named by Thomson Reuters in 2015, 2016, 2017 and 2018 as in the top 1% of scientists who are "the world's most influential scientific minds in her field. In 2017, Lawlor was awarded a Commander of the Most Excellent Order of the British Empire (CBE) in the Queen's Birthday Honours for her services to social and community medicine research.
