= The Babymaker: The Dr. Cecil Jacobson Story =

1994 television film

- VHS cover
- Also known as: Seeds of Deception
- Genre: Drama
- Written by: Phil Penningroth; Sharon Elizabeth Doyle
- Directed by: Arlene Sanford
- Starring: Melissa Gilbert
- Music by: James McVay
- Country of origin: United States
- Original language: English

Production
- Executive producer: Michael Jaffe
- Producer: Michael Jaffe
- Production location: Toronto
- Cinematography: Rodney Charters
- Editor: Bill Goddard
- Running time: 95 minutes
- Production companies: Babymaker Productions; Heartstar Productions (in association with) Jaffe/Braunstein Films

Original release
- Network: CBS
- Release: February 8, 1994

The Babymaker: The Dr. Cecil Jacobson Story (also released as Seeds of Deception) is a 1994 American made-for-television drama film directed by Arlene Sanford. The film is based on the true story of Cecil Jacobson, who used his own sperm to impregnate patients, without informing them. The Babymaker: The Dr. Cecil Jacobson Story premiered on CBS on February 8, 1994. The film was criticized for not giving a clear portrayal of Jacobson, but George Dzundza was praised for his performance.

== Plot ==
The film starts in 1985. Cecil Jacobson is a successful doctor, running his own reproductive genetic center. He is earning the respect of other doctors and is even nicknamed 'The Babymaker'. Nobody knows that he secretly uses his own sperm to impregnate his patients.

One of his patients is Mary Bennett, a woman desperate to have a baby. She is unable to become a mother, however, because her husband Greg underwent a vasectomy. She is directed there by her friend Nita, who also had artificial insemination. Greg isn't enthusiastic about the idea, but Mary convinces him to talk to Dr. Jacobson, explaining it might be their only chance. Greg has trouble accepting that the insemination requires an anonymous donor and admits he isn't ready to be a father. Mary's mother instincts make her decide to still have the insemination and, yet again, Dr. Jacobson uses his own sperm samples. Meanwhile, Mary's friend Sue thinks she is thirteen weeks pregnant, when she suddenly bleeds. She contacts Dr. Jacobson, but he assures her there is nothing wrong and he even shows her the shape of the baby on the ultrasound.

Sue, still thinking that there is something wrong, contacts a second doctor, who reveals that she is not pregnant and that the so-called shape of the baby is actually fecal matter. She discovers that there are several cases of people who have received a false-positive pregnancy test at Dr. Jacobson's facility. She wants to confront him, but her husband pressures her to pretend as if nothing has happened, to see how far Dr. Jacobson will go with the lies. She does inform Mary, however, but she is reluctant to believe her, because she has just had her pregnancy confirmed.

Sue and Bill later confront Dr. Jacobson, and he blames the false results on the equipment. However, he does insist that there is fetal matter in her body, which means that she was indeed pregnant. Sue warns Mary about the doctor, but she refuses to believe her and they are soon estranged. It turns out that Mary was indeed pregnant, and she eventually gives birth to a boy. Five years later, Dr. Jacobson is charged with making people believe that they are pregnant. Mary thinks that they are false charges and blames it on Sue and Bill. A trial ensues and soon rumours are spread that he used his own sperm for inseminations. Mary is determined to find out if he is the donor and soon starts to notice similarities between her son and the doctor.

Greg advises her to leave it behind her, explaining that he doesn't want their son, Jesse, to get involved with the trial. The hatred Mary feels for Dr. Jacobson starts to grow, but Greg forbids her to testify against him. She doesn't listen to him, however, and with the help of Sue, she goes to court in disguise.

After giving an emotional testimony, Dr. Jacobson admits to the charges, but insists he did it for health reasons. He is eventually found guilty on all charges. In the end, Mary and Greg make up and Sue announces that she is pregnant. In the after-titles, it is announced that Dr. Jacobson was sentenced to jail for five years after being found guilty on 46 counts of fraud and 6 of perjury and was recently freed on bail pending appeal, and that Sue gave birth to a healthy boy.

== Cast ==
- Melissa Gilbert as Mary Bennett
- Shanna Reed as Sue Castellano
- George Dzundza as Dr. Cecil Jacobson
- Tom Verica as Greg Bennett
- Tim Progosh as Mr. Black
- Shannon Lawson as Nita
- Geoffrey Bowes as Dr. Mason
- Michael Charles Roman as Jesse Bennett
- R. H. Thomson as Bill Castellano
