= Reproductive surgery =

Using surgery in the field of reproductive medicine

- Specialty: Reproductive medicine

Reproductive Surgeon
Occupation
- Names: Physician; Surgeon
- Occupation type: Specialty
- Activity sectors: Medicine, Surgery

Description
- Education required: Doctor of Medicine (M.D.); Doctor of Osteopathic medicine (D.O.); Bachelor of Medicine, Bachelor of Surgery (M.B.B.S.); Bachelor of Medicine, Bachelor of Surgery (MBChB)
- Fields of employment: Hospitals, Clinics

Reproductive surgery is surgery in the field of reproductive medicine. It can be used for contraception, e.g. in vasectomy, wherein the vasa deferentia of a male are severed, but is also used plentifully in assisted reproductive technology. Reproductive surgery is generally divided into three categories: surgery for infertility, in vitro fertilization, and fertility preservation.

A reproductive surgeon is an obstetrician-gynecologist or urologist who specializes in reproductive surgery.

Reproductive surgeries will be referred to based on biological sex, and terms such male and female will be used to denote to men and women respectively.

== Uses ==
Reproductive surgery aims to address concerns spanning from male and female fertility to gender-affirming care. Uses for reproductive surgery may encompass different abnormalities, dysfunctions, and areas of focus that are unable to be treated solely through medication or nonsurgical treatment. Screening measures may be completed to determine the necessity of surgery. For example, intrauterine pathology may be assessed by utilizing techniques such as hysteroscopy to identify complications for reproductive surgical interventions.

Assisted reproductive technology (ART) supports enhancement of fertility success through processes such as in vitro fertilization (IVF). Screening and reproductive surgery also have a role in identifying and addressing abnormalities, such as notable cysts, prior to initiating IVF. Surgical sperm retrieval is an alternative means of semen collection, where other means are not possible in circumstances like posthumous sperm retrieval or male infertility.

These surgical techniques may also be utilized as a form of permanent contraception referred to as sterilization. A vasectomy or tubal ligation would be examples of this procedure for male and female individuals respectively. Reproductive surgeons can potentially perform a reverse vasectomy to restore male reproductive function following the vasectomy. Individuals may choose to reverse the procedure due to pain experience after the surgery.

People might find themselves wanting to preserve their fertility. Biological material such as sperm or oocyte are capable of being surgically collected and preserved cryogenically. Fertility preservation also provides individuals who are receiving gender-affirming surgeries the option of preserving gametes if having biological children is desired following the procedures and hormonal therapy.

Reproductive surgery is also considered for complications such as endometriosis, polyendocrine metabolic ovarian syndrome (PMOS), ectopic pregnancy, and vas deferens obstruction.

== Trends ==
=== History ===
Albeit an increase in overall use of assisted reproductive technology (ART), surgeries on the fallopian tubes and ovaries have decreased, leading to a rise in insecurity in the field of reproductive surgery. Reproductive surgery in women has largely been complementary to other ART methods such as medication, except for in tubal infertility, where surgery remains the main treatment. Although reproductive surgery has been most relevant for severe symptoms, there has been a strong interest in greater analysis surrounding this topic of research.

Reproductive surgery first began with fertility sparing surgeries, such as uterine myomectomy, and was transitioned later into the addition of surgeries for infertility and the advancement of success rates for fertility. Hysterectomies and myomectomies date back to ancient times, where fascination grew around fertility sparing surgeries, specifically for young women who were able to conceive but were considered to have suspected ailments. However, the lack of knowledge of medicine eventually led to mortality, thereby causing myomectomies to become more uncommon. Overtime, various advancements and extensive research allowed for the discovery of minimally invasive myomectomies, which became popular among women who were capable of bearing children.

Laparoscopy continues to be a common procedure approach as it is minimally invasive and is thought to be associated with a decrease in hospital stay and surgical complications. The development of newer technology and surgical techniques allowed for the increase in success rates for various other surgeries, such as endometriosis and adenomyosis surgeries or adnexal surgeries.

=== The future of reproductive surgery ===
With respect to the future of reproductive surgeries, greater advancements of surgical techniques and equipment are growing in popularity to increase the potential of fertility success rates. For example, vaginal natural orifice transluminal endoscopic surgery (vNOTES) is a new innovative approach that has been used for ovarian torsion, tubal ectopic pregnancy, and ovarian cystectomies. This surgical approach is minimally invasive and has emerged in an effort to reduce pain, risks, and potential for scarring. Another technique that has emerged is radiofrequency ablation (RFA) which has been used for uterine fibroids. It works to necrotize fibroids through the use of laparoscopic and transcervical procedures with two devices, Acessa (Hologic) and Sonata (Gynesonics). However, these two medical devices come with the caveat that fertility may not be preserved in those with uterine leiomyoma. Although not ideal for people who are able to and wanting to bear children, RFA still poses as an alternative successful technique to reducing the volume of fibroids.

A new common interest in alliance with reproductive surgery is the use of regenerative medicine. Although it has not been studied in its entirety, the use of stem cells to restore damaged endometrium has shown promising improvements. Regenerative medicine has been used for premature ovarian failure and will continue to be studied for in vitro fertilization (IVF). With the use of various stem cells, researchers hope to mitigate and treat any future signs of infertility with the use of two specific stem cells, induced pluripotent stem cells (iPSCs) and mesenchymal stem cells (MSC).

== Risks/complications ==
The risks and complications of reproductive surgery depend on patient specific characteristics and the degree of the surgery itself; however, some common complications of general reproductive surgery are hemorrhage, visceral damage, infection, and blot clotting.

In vasectomies, infection and hematomas are the most frequently reported complications of surgery, with the incidence rate of infection being 3-4% and the incidence rate of hematoma ranging around 0-29%. An important note to consider is the fact that the surgical technique of the vasectomy did have an impact on the incident rates of these complications. No-scalpel vasectomy (NSV) is widely recognized due to its low incident rate of complications. Another common complication of vasectomy is post-vasectomy pain syndrome (PVPS). PVPS involves chronic pain that may be persistent or intermittent in one or both of the testicles, and lasting longer than three months after the procedure. While the pathophysiology of PVPS is unknown, various causes include damage to structures of the testis, buildup of pressure from epididymal congestion, and compression of nerves in the testis. The pain in PVPS can manifest in various forms, such as pain and tenderness in the scrotum, pressure or pain after ejaculation, pain with sex, etc. Incidence rates of PVPS are around 1-14%.

In hysterectomies, complications of the procedure include infection, gastrointestinal injury, and venous thromboembolic injury. Similar to vasectomies, one of the most common complications is infection, with the incidence rate being 10.5% for abdominal hysterectomy, 13% for vaginal hysterectomy, and 9% for laparoscopic hysterectomy.

Today, one of the most effective forms of ART is in vitro fertilization (IVF). While it is very effective in those experiencing infertility, there are numerous risks of IVF, such as multiple births, premature delivery, and ovarian hyper-stimulation syndrome. Ovarian hyper-stimulation syndrome is a condition that involves enlargement of the ovaries as the result of the injected fertility drugs causing increased capacity of the blood vessels to allow molecules to go in and out. It can lead to abdominal pain, soreness, and nausea for those experiencing it. The symptoms and severity of ovarian hyper-stimulation syndrome can be classified amongst various grades. Grade 1 involves mild discomfort and abdominal distention, and as the grades increase, severity and symptoms also increase. Grade 4 and grade 5 encompass severe ovarian hyper-stimulation syndrome and involve changes in blood volume and viscosity due to the condition. Those who have a history of heightened response to gonadotropins, history of previous ovarial hyper-stimulation, and/or have a history of polyendocrine metabolic ovarian syndrome (PMOS) are at increased risk of developing this complication.

== Contraindications ==
There are no existing medical guidelines that outline the absolute contraindications to reproductive surgery. However, there are relative contraindications recommended in the current literature. There are several circumstances under which having reproductive surgery is contraindicated. This is because surgery itself may cause extensive tissue damage to the person, the success of the procedure is limited (i.e. the condition is invasive or metastatic), or the surgery's potential risk outweighs the potential benefits. However, each person's situation is different and the possibility of reproductive surgery should be consulted with a healthcare professional.

Uterine atony after fetal extraction, and pre-existing maternal bleeding disorders have been reported as accepted contraindications for cesarean myomectomies in women. Contraindications to reproductive surgery used for tubal surgery and infertility include women ages 43 and older, tubal disease that surgery cannot treat (i.e., surgery cannot be safely performed without hurting the person or the patient has multiple medical conditions that reduces the chance of success), bipolar disease, and abnormal semen analysis.

Many studies examining surgery for endometriosis excluded women who previously received medical or surgical treatment for endometriosis. Women with a pre-operative diagnosis of a deep endometriosis of their bowel or bladder were also excluded from surgery.

For male reproductive surgery for the treatment of varicocele by percutaneous embolization, current literature considers adolescents, allergies to contrast, men with a bilateral grade 3 varicocele, and men with primary infertility as relative contraindications to surgery.
