= Cecil Jacobson =

American fertility doctor and fraudster (1936–2021)

- Born: October 2, 1936; Salt Lake City, Utah, U.S.
- Died: March 5, 2021 (aged 84); Springville, Utah
- Occupations: Physician, researcher
- Known for: Using his own sperm to impregnate his patients
- Criminal charges: Mail fraud, wire fraud and perjury
- Criminal penalty: Five years' jail time and $116,805 in fines
- Children: up to 75
- Awards: Ig Nobel Prize in Biology (1992)

Cecil Byran Jacobson (October 2, 1936 – March 5, 2021) was an American former fertility doctor who used his own sperm to impregnate his patients without informing them.

Jacobson was born in Salt Lake City, Utah. A graduate of Brown University, he became a researcher at George Washington University, but had no specialist training in infertility medicine.

== Baboon impregnation ==
In the 1960s, Jacobson, who was Chief of the Reproductive Genetics Unit at George Washington University Medical School, claimed that he had impregnated a male baboon; he had supposedly implanted his sperm into a female baboon’s abdominal cavity. He claimed that he had terminated the pregnancy after four months, but never published his results in scientific publications.

== False pregnancies ==
In the 1980s, Jacobson operated a reproductive genetics center in Fairfax County, Virginia. He specialized in treating women who had difficulty getting pregnant, or problems carrying a pregnancy to term. One form of treatment was to inject patients, before and after conception, with the hormone hCG (commonly used as a parenteral fertility medication and a hormone normally released during pregnancy), and patients who had been unable to conceive with other treatments reported success under Jacobson's care.

The pregnancies progressed normally through the early stages: standard pregnancy tests were positive and patients' bodies began to undergo changes associated with pregnancy. Jacobson performed ultrasounds, identifying a fetus in the grainy image. Around the third month, Jacobson would report that the fetus had died. In fact, these patients were never pregnant, and the bodily changes were a reaction to the hCG. The pregnancy tests were inevitably false positives because the tests determined pregnancy by the presence of hCG. During Jacobson's criminal trial, experts examined the ultrasound photographs, and reported that the purported "fetuses" were actually nearby organs or fecal matter.

Nevertheless, other patients were successful in becoming pregnant and having children. While some patients were uncomfortable with Jacobson's manner, and began to distrust him, other patients gave him credit for successful treatment.

== Paternity ==
In 1989, suspicious former patients tipped off a local television station, which investigated and reported on the false pregnancies. Jacobson was sued by numerous patients. Federal prosecutors charged Jacobson with perjury (for false testimony during the civil proceedings) and mail and wire fraud (for the use of the letters and the telephone system as part of his fraudulent practice).

During the course of the criminal investigation, another type of fraud came to light. For a variety of reasons, some patients had arranged to be artificially inseminated with sperm provided by screened, anonymous donors arranged by Jacobson. In order to preserve the anonymity of the donors, Jacobson explained, he identified them in records using code numbers; only Jacobson was to know their true identities. Investigators found no evidence that any donor program actually existed. Some of Jacobson's patients who had conceived through donor insemination agreed to genetic testing. At least seven instances were identified in which Jacobson was the biological father of the patients' children, including one patient who was supposed to have been inseminated with sperm provided by her husband. DNA tests linked Jacobson to at least 15 such children, and it has been suspected that he fathered as many as 75 children by impregnating patients with his own sperm.

== Aftermath ==
=== Defense ===
Jacobson vigorously denied wrongdoing. He offered these explanations: With regard to the "false pregnancy" cases, he had believed that the women had actually been pregnant, and continued to maintain that some of them really were pregnant. He was well aware that injected hCG could trigger a false positive on a pregnancy test, but thought that the dosages he administered were too low to have that effect. If he misread the ultrasound results, that was an honest error. As for the donor insemination, Jacobson maintained that he had in fact relied on anonymous donors as claimed. He acknowledged using his own sperm on some occasions, when donors failed to show up when needed, and a patient was about to miss a window of opportunity to become pregnant. He could not account for the incident in which his own sperm was used in place of the patient's husband's, other than to suggest cross-contamination in the laboratory.

=== Sentence ===
In 1992, Jacobson was convicted of 52 counts of mail fraud, wire fraud, and perjury. He was sentenced to five years in prison and had his medical license revoked. Jacobson appealed his convictions and sentence, but they were upheld by the court of appeals. He later moved to Provo, Utah, where he was involved in agricultural research.

=== Ig Nobel Prize ===
He was awarded the Ig Nobel Prize for Biology in 1992, which cited him as "Dr. Cecil Jacobson, relentlessly generous sperm donor, and prolific patriarch of sperm banking, for devising a simple, single-handed method of quality control."

=== Death ===
Jacobson died on March 5, 2021 in Springville, Utah at the age of 84. His cause of death was reported as complications due to health issues he had been dealing with prior.

== In the media ==
- Elements of the case were echoed in the 2021 Hulu film False Positive.
- A book was written about the case, Babymaker: Fertility, Fraud and the Fall of Doctor Cecil Jacobson (1993), Rick Nelson, ISBN 0-553-56162-6
- The story was made into a 1994 TV film: The Babymaker: The Dr. Cecil Jacobson Story
- The case formed the basis of a Season 5 episode of Law & Order, "Seed"
- Elements of the case were echoed in Season 4 episode of Fringe, "A Better Human Being"
- Elements of the case were echoed in Season 1 episode of Awake, "The Little Guy"
- Elements of the case were echoed in Season 1 episode of Reaper, "Coming to Grips"
- The case was discussed in the Harvard University's course 'Justice' by Michael Sandel
- An SNL skit with John Goodman starring as Cecil Jacobson was performed, where Jacobson was sentenced by the courts to star in a sitcom with the 75 children he fathered.

== See also ==
- Baby God
- Bernard Norman Barwin
- Donald Cline
- Fertility fraud
- List of Ig Nobel Prize winners
- List of people with the most children
- Our Father (2022 film)
