= Bonei Olam =

American Jewish organization

- בוני עולם
- Founders: Rabbi Shlomo Bochner and R' Yumi Kleinbart
- Founded at: Brooklyn, New York, US
- Purpose: Medicine, family planning
- Headquarters: Brooklyn, New York, US
- Funding: Private donations, government funding
- Website: www.boneiolam.org

Bonei Olam (Hebrew: בוני עולם, lit. 'builders of the world') is a Brooklyn, New York-based tax-exempt organization that assists Jewish couples that are experiencing infertility.

== History ==
It was founded by and is currently led by Rabbi Shlomo Bochner and R' Yumi Kleinbart with a mission to provide funding for fertility treatments, and relieve couples of emotional and physical stress resulting from infertility. Bonei Olam's medical and rabbinical advisory board is headed by Rabbi Yechiel Mechel Steinmetz, the Skwere Dayan of Boro Park.

Bonei Olam started in Brooklyn and has grown to have branches across the United States as well as in Israel, Canada, Belgium and the United Kingdom. In 1999, the first baby funded by Bonei Olam was born. To date, Bonei Olam has been involved in the birth of over 13,000 children.

Bonei Olam is funded by private donations and government funding.

== Services ==
Bonei Olam has developed a network of doctors and fertility centers across the world, enabling them to offer medical and financial assistance worldwide.

Bonei Olam assigns each couple a PIN in order to keep all of their cases confidential and private. When a couple contacts Bonei Olam a team of trained counselors and medical experts provide consultations, referrals, counseling and an advanced genetics program to guide them through the labyrinth of medical information and assist them in their quest to become parents.

== See also ==
- A T.I.M.E.
- Puah Institute
- Religious response to ART
