= Poulterer's Case =

English legal case

Poulterer's Case, 77 Eng. Rep. 813 (K.B. 1611), is a legal case that broadened the definition of conspiracy. It broadened the previous narrow definition to include attempt. The case was decided in the Court of Star Chamber.
