= Autologous endometrial coculture =

Technique of assisted reproductive technology

Autologous Endometrial Coculture is a technique of assisted reproductive technology. It involves placing a patient’s fertilized eggs on top of a layer of cells from her own uterine lining, creating a more natural environment for embryo development and maximizing the chance for an in vitro fertilization (IVF) pregnancy.

== How Coculture is performed ==
A typical Coculture cycle consists of the following steps:
1. Once a patient has been deemed an appropriate candidate for the procedure, she undergoes an endometrial biopsy during which a small piece of her uterine lining is removed.
2. The uterine lining sample is sent to a research lab, where it is treated, purified and frozen.
3. The patient then undergoes a typical IVF cycle and is given medication to stimulate egg growth in her ovaries.
4. The patient’s eggs are retrieved and mixed with the sperm. At this time, the lab begins thawing and growing her endometrial cells.
5. Once fertilization is confirmed, the patient’s embryos are placed on top of her own (and now thawed) endometrial cells.
6. Over the next two days, the embryos are closely monitored for growth and development.
7. The patient’s embryos are transferred into her uterus for implantation and pregnancy.

== The potential candidate ==
Coculture can be an effective treatment for patients who have failed previous IVF cycles or who have poor embryo quality.

== Advantages ==
A study of 12,377 embryo cultures showed that endometrial coculture is significantly better than sequential culture media; the rates (fraction) reaching blastocyst stage were 56% versus 46% in the coculture versus the sequential system, respectively, with own oocytes. With eggs from ovum donations, the rates were 71% versus 56%, respectively. Pregnancy rates were 39% vs. 28% and implantation rates were 33% vs. 21%.

In addition to being noninvasive and relatively pain free, Coculture can be performed during a short office visit. The procedure also can improve embryo quality and stimulate embryo growth.

== Risks ==
The risks of Coculture are minimal. The procedure has been performed in over 1000 patients with no reported detrimental effects on embryo growth. Complications involving uterine infection or damage caused by endometrial biopsy are extremely rare.
