= Ricardo Asch =

Argentine physician, researcher

- Born: Ricardo Héctor Asch; October 26, 1947 (age 79); Buenos Aires, Argentina
- Occupations: obstetrician, gynecologist, and endocrinologist

Ricardo Héctor Asch (born 26 October 1947) is an Argentine-Mexican obstetrician, gynecologist, and endocrinologist. He worked with reproductive technology and pioneered gamete intrafallopian transfer (GIFT), as well as working on research linking fertility and marijuana usage, and investigated the use of GnRH analogues with Andrew Schally. In the mid-1990s he was accused of transferring ova harvested from women into other patients without proper consent at the University of California, Irvine's fertility clinic. Asch left the United States one year before a federal indictment was filed. He was tried and acquitted of all charges in Argentina in 2008. In 2011, Mexico denied an extradition request by the United States as it would constitute double jeopardy and no new evidence was brought forth. As of 2020, he is living in Mexico City.

== Education and early career ==
Born in Buenos Aires, Argentina, Asch studied at the University of Buenos Aires School of Medicine graduating in 1971. In 1975, he moved to the United States and worked with Robert Benjamin Greenblatt at the Medical College of Georgia before his reproductive endocrinology fellowship at the University of Texas Health Science Center at San Antonio. Among his many publications were his pioneering experience with GIFT and research on oocyte donation. In 1986, he joined the University of California, Irvine School of Medicine (UCI). In 1990, he became the Director of the Center for Reproductive Health of UCI heading the infertility program. Asch was named Assistant Dean of outreach at UCI, in charge of overseeing recruitment of minority students, the same year. He lectured worldwide and accrued two honorary professorships by 1994.

== UC Irvine fertility scandal ==
In 1995, the Orange County Register broke the story that Asch—then Chief of the University of California, Irvine's Center for Reproductive Health—and his two partners were accused of transferring women's eggs harvested from women into other patients without their permission. These eggs were fertilized and the resulting embryos transferred to these other women, some of them then conceiving. At least 15 live births resulted from the alleged practice. At that time, the misappropriation of human eggs was not legally considered a crime. However, numerous civil lawsuits were filed, and UCI paid out more than $27 million to settle patient claims. Asch disagreed with the settlements because they did not allow him to prove his innocence or repair his reputation. Auditors from KPMG Peat Marwick investigated the clinic and found that almost $1 million in income at the clinic had not been reported.

Asch was defended by students, and colleagues, including Robert Edwards, who accused the media of convicting him before he was charged.

The Orange County Register's investigations into these practices led to that paper's receiving the 1996 Pulitzer Prize for Investigative Reporting.

In 2006, university officials admitted to the Los Angeles Times that they had not notified at least 20 women whose eggs were allegedly used by Asch and his colleagues.

=== Aftermath ===
Asch and colleagues Jose Balmaceda and Sergio Stone were indicted on charges of mail fraud and income tax evasion. Asch suspended his practice, sold his properties, and left for Mexico. Balmaceda escaped to Chile, while Stone stayed in the US and was convicted of insurance fraud in 1997 and paid a fine. In January 1996, Asch testified at a deposition in Tijuana that university employees were responsible for errors that had occurred such as mismatching patients and failing to obtain patient consents.

Asch later opened a practice in Mexico and later in Argentina. He was formally fired by the university in 2000. He attained a Mexican citizenship in 2001 in addition to his native Argentine citizenship.

=== Extradition efforts and acquittal ===
In 2004, Asch was arrested in Buenos Aires. He was tried in Argentina and in 2008 was acquitted of all charges.

Asch was arrested again in Mexico in November 2010. On December 30, 2010, the Mexican Attorney's General Office (PGR) announced on its website that it had initiated proceedings to have Asch extradited to the United States. However, Asch was released on bail in early 2011. Subsequently, the judge ruled that as Asch had already been tried in Argentina and acquitted, and as no new evidence was provided, the "double jeopardy" rule applied, thus Asch was free and would not be extradited to the United States.

== Research ==
Asch worked with reproductive technology and pioneered gamete intrafallopian transfer (GIFT), a technique in which eggs are removed from a woman's ovaries, and placed in one of the Fallopian tubes, along with the man's sperm. He also worked on research linking marijuana and other drugs to hormone production, ovary function, and the effect on testicles in primates, and the possible negative effects of the usage of neuroactive drugs during adolescence and puberty. Asch worked with Andrew Schally understanding the effects of the Gonadotropin-releasing hormone (GnRH) in infertility and contraception in primates. In 1999 he worked on methods for giving birth to a healthy baby in couples with one HIV+ partner.

According to Scopus, Asch has an h-index of 46, and over 6700 citations, which would place him in the top 1% of researchers by citations in the Essential Science Indicators.

== Awards and other activities ==
Asch, who owned an entertainment company at the time of the scandal, was one of the producers of the Andre Agassi and Nick Bollettieri instructional tennis video Attack.

== See also ==
- Fertility fraud
