= Gamete intrafallopian transfer =

- MeSH: D015181

Gamete intrafallopian transfer (GIFT) is a tool of assisted reproductive technology against infertility. Eggs are removed from a woman's ovaries, and placed in one of the fallopian tubes, along with the man's sperm. The technique, first attempted by Patrick Steptoe and Robert Edwards and later pioneered by endocrinologist Ricardo Asch, allows fertilization to take place inside the woman's uterus.

With the advances in IVF the GIFT procedure is used less as pregnancy rates in IVF tend to be equal or better and do not require laparoscopy when the egg is put back.

== Method ==
It takes, on average, four to six weeks to complete a cycle of GIFT. First, the woman must take a fertility drug to stimulate egg production in the ovaries. The doctor will monitor the growth of the ovarian follicles, and once they are mature, the woman will be injected with human chorionic gonadotropin (hCG). The eggs will be harvested approximately 36 hours later, mixed with the man's sperm, and placed back into the woman's fallopian tubes using a laparoscope.

== Indications ==
A woman must have at least one normal fallopian tube in order for GIFT to be suitable. It is used in instances where the fertility problem relates to sperm dysfunction, and where the couple has idiopathic (unknown cause) infertility. Some patients may prefer the procedure to IVF for ethical reasons, since the fertilization takes place inside the body. This is a semi invasive procedure and requires laparoscopy.

== Success rate ==
As with most fertility procedures, success depends on the couple's age and the woman's egg quality. It is estimated that approximately 25–30% of GIFT cycles result in pregnancy, with a third of those being twins or triplets, etc. The First GIFT baby in the UK was Todd Holden born in October 1986. The first application of this method in Latin America was held in Argentina on 13 May 1986, and was led by Dr. Ricardo Asch, the treatment was successfully completed with the birth of Manuel Campo Lopez. In Venezuela, the first GIFT babies were Luis Hernández, Rosa Helena Hernández and Luisa Hernández, who were born on 24 June 1987 and were also the first triplets to be born using the GIFT method.

== Bioethical issues ==
Gamete intrafallopian transfer is not technically in vitro fertilisation because with GIFT, fertilisation takes place inside the body, not on a petri dish. Some Catholic moral theologians are nevertheless concerned with it because they "consider this to be a replacement of the marital act, and therefore immoral."

== See also ==
- Zygote intrafallopian transfer
