= Zygote intrafallopian transfer =

Embryos are laparoscopically transferred into fallopian tube

- MeSH: D017388

Zygote intra fallopian transfer (ZIFT) is an infertility treatment used when a blockage in the fallopian tubes prevents the normal binding of sperm to the egg. Egg cells are removed from a woman's ovaries, and in vitro fertilised. The resulting zygote is placed into the fallopian tube by the use of laparoscopy. The procedure is a spin-off of the gamete intrafallopian transfer (GIFT) procedure. The pregnancy and implantation rates in ZIFT cycles are 52.3 and 23.2% which were higher than what was observed in IVF cycles which were 17.5 and 9.7%.

== Procedure ==
The average ZIFT cycle takes five to six weeks to complete. First, the female must take a fertility medication clomiphene to stimulate egg production in the ovaries. The doctor will monitor the growth of the ovarian follicles, and once they are mature, the woman will receive an injection containing human chorionic gonadotropins (HCG or hCG). The eggs will be harvested approximately 36 hours later, usually by transvaginal ovum retrieval. After fertilization in the laboratory, the resulting early embryos or zygotes are placed into the woman's fallopian tubes using a laparoscope.

== Indications ==
ZIFT has been used in infertility situations where at least one of the fallopian tubes is normal and other treatments have failed; however, the need for two interventions and the fact that IVF results are equal or better (as of 2004), leaves few indications for this procedure. Accordingly, the number of ZIFTs performed has been declining.
