= Spontaneous conception =

Conception of a child without medical assistance

Spontaneous conception is the conception and birth of a child naturally, without the use of in vitro fertilisation or other forms of assisted reproductive technology. There is an overall 18% chance of spontaneous conception after an in vitro fertilization (IVF) treatment, but that chance rose to 37% among younger women (less than 27 years). The likelihood also depends on the sperm performance of the man and the egg count of the woman.
