= Embryo splitting =

Embryo splitting may refer to:

- when spontaneous, the natural way in which identical twins are formed.
- when artificially induced, a method of cloning. See Cloning#Methods
