= Donald Cline =

American fertility specialist and fraudster (born 1938)

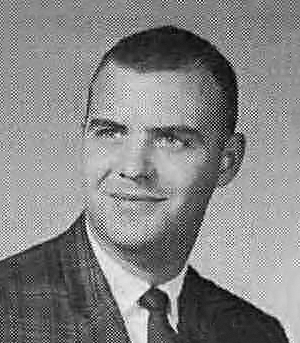
- University yearbook portrait, 1964
- Born: December 10, 1938 (age 87); Indianapolis, Indiana, US
- Education: Indiana University (BS, MD)
- Occupation: Reproductive endocrinologist and infertility specialist
- Years active: 1979–2009
- Known for: Inseminating his own sperm into unwitting patients and fathering at least 94 children
- Status: Released
- Conviction: Obstruction of justice (2 counts)
- Penalty: One-year suspended sentence

Details
- Date apprehended: September 14, 2016

Donald Lee Cline (born December 10, 1938) is a former American medical doctor of obstetrics and gynecology. Between 1974 and 1987, Cline sired over 94 children without disclosing himself as the sperm donor to his patients. As of May 11, 2022, Cline has been confirmed as the biological father of 94 offspring.

== Education and career ==
Cline received his undergraduate degree from Indiana University and his M.D. from Indiana University School of Medicine. After interning at Indiana University Health Methodist Hospital, he served two years in the Air Force and 12 years as inactive reserve. In 1979, Cline opened his clinic on 2020 West 86th Street in Indianapolis and specialized in reproductive endocrinology & infertility. He practiced there until retiring in 2009. Following his felony conviction in 2018, Cline surrendered his medical license. He is prohibited from reinstatement by the Medical Licensing Board of Indiana.

== Fertility fraud ==
In 2014 when Jacoba Ballard, a daughter of a former patient of Cline, reviewed the results of her at-home DNA test, she discovered a biological connection to eight previously unknown half-siblings. (Note: Ballard learned at age 10 that she was conceived via donor sperm. She also knew Cline was her mother's fertility doctor.) Her genetic genealogy research ultimately revealed Cline, her mother's fertility doctor, as her biological father. Cline is now known to have covertly fathered at least 94 offspring.

=== Investigations and litigation ===
Ballard filed a complaint with the Attorney General of Indiana who initiated an investigation in 2015. Then Indiana attorney general Tim DeLaney declined to prosecute because "there was no law forbidding Cline's conduct." Ballard then pursued media coverage. Fox59 anchor Angela Ganote investigated her story. During her investigation, Ganote learned that Cline had lied to the attorney general's office in their investigation. Documents show that he had told investigators, "I can emphatically say that at no time did I ever use my own sample for insemination nor was I a donor."

After a story aired on Fox59, Cline left a voicemail for Ballard contradicting what he had told investigators. "Uh, this is Dr. Cline, You know, I thought I was doing the right thing. I only donated my own sample nine or 10 times," he said. He had placed the call to ask Ballard for help with damage control. "Um, my wife and I, uh, after 57 years of marriage, um, we have had a great deal of problems over this. She considers this adultery. I donated my sample. Gonna lose my wife. Our marriage will be over. Can you help?"

Ganote told DeLaney that Cline was lying to them. Ballard played the audio of the voice mail. The attorney general then conducted an independent DNA test. The results confirmed a 99.9997% probability of paternity. Charges were filed against Cline. In State of Indiana v. Donald Cline, Cline pleaded guilty to two Level 6 felony counts of obstruction of justice and received a one-year suspended sentence.

On November 30, 2016, Elizabeth White and son Matthew White filed a proposed complaint for damages and demand for jury trial with the State of Indiana Department of Insurance. The proposed complaint cites negligence, constructive fraud, battery, breach of contract, breach of express warranty, and negligent hiring or retention as to defendant and reproductive endocrinology associates. They then filed a multi-count complaint in Marion Superior Court. Cline's motion to dismiss was denied. In an interlocutory appeal, a panel of Indiana Court of Appeals affirmed the lower court's decision, finding that "Matthew sufficiently stated breach of contract and tort claims for which relief can be granted."

As of May 2022, Cline had paid out more than $1.35 million to settle three civil lawsuits filed by donor children and families. Three more are pending.

=== List of Cline court cases ===
Case	Type	Court	Date started	Date ended	Disposition
State of Indiana v. Donald L. Cline	Felony 6	Marion Superior Court 26	September 9, 2016	December 14, 2017	Decided; plea guilty, one-year suspended sentence, fine $500; petition for AMS filed and denied
Jacoba Ballard, Deborah Pierce v. Anonymous Health Care Provider, John Doe, M.D.	CT - Civil Tort	Marion Superior Court 3	October 5, 2016	January 24, 2022	Decided; dismissed with prejudice
Julie Manes, Dianna Kiesler v. Anonymous Health Care Provider d/b/a Anonymous, John Doe	CT - Civil Tort	Marion Superior Court 5	January 13, 2017	January 25, 2022	Decided; dismissed, with prejudice
Donald L. Cline v. State of Indiana	CR - Direct Appeals (Non Capital, Non-LWOP)	Court of Appeals	June 26, 2017	February 23, 2018	Closed
Elizabeth White, Matthew White v. Anonymous Physician 1, Indianapolis Infertility, Inc. and dba Reproductive Endocrinology Assoc	CT - Civil Tort	Marion Superior Court, Civil Division 4	December 13, 2016		Pending (active)

=== Legislation ===
The Cline fertility fraud and similar doctor-donated sperm cases exposed a lack of legislation specific to infertility patients' and their children's rights. (Note: More than 50 U.S. fertility doctors are accused of fraud related to sperm donation.) Ballard lobbied the state of Indiana for change. On May 17, 2019, Indiana became the first state to designate fertility fraud as a Level 6 felony. S.E.A. 174, P.L. 215 became effective July 1, 2019. It reads:

Establishes a cause of action for civil fertility fraud and provides that a prevailing plaintiff may be awarded: (1) compensatory and punitive damages; or (2) liquidated damages of $10,000. Specifies the statute of limitations for civil fertility fraud. Increases the penalty for deception involving the identity of a person or the identity or quantity of property to a Level 6 felony if the offense involves a misrepresentation relating to: (1) a medical procedure, device, or drug; and (2) human reproductive material. Urges the legislative council to assign the topic of fertility laws, including gestational surrogacy, to an appropriate study committee.

States which have enacted legislation: Arizona, Arkansas, California, Colorado, Florida, Indiana, Iowa, Texas, Utah

States proposing legislation: Michigan, Nebraska, New York, Ohio, Kentucky, Oregon, Pennsylvania, Washington

There is no Federal legislation specifically applicable to fertility fraud.

== Effect on Cline's patients and their children ==
=== Genetic health concerns ===
There is a high presence of auto-immune disorders among Cline's donor-fathered children. Cline's own auto-immune condition, rheumatoid arthritis, would have excluded him as an eligible sperm donor at his own clinic.

Many of the donor-children live within a 25-mile (40 km) radius of each other. Their concern with consanguinity and its potential genetic disorders increases as their own children grow up and develop intimate relationships. In an extended profile piece in The Atlantic, reporter Sarah Zhang wrote:

The donor children have begun cataloging the ways their own paths have crossed, too. White went to Purdue at the same time as one of his half brothers. One sibling sold another a wagon at a garage sale. Two of them lived on the same street. Two had kids on the same softball team. They're worried that their children are getting old enough to date soon. 'Did you not consider we all live in a relatively close area?' one sister said she has wondered about Cline. 'Did you really think … that we wouldn't meet? That we wouldn't maybe date? That we wouldn't have kids who might date? Did you never consider that?' Cline now looms over their kids' every innocent crush, their every prom date.

=== Impact statements ===
Todd Foster, donor child: "It was like this gut punch. Someone just cut the tether to who I am. Because we're all taught our identity resides in our blood, right? That's why I took the damn DNA test. But yeah, this complete feeling like my whole identity, is that gone? Am I no longer a Foster? I literally had to just rest my hand and kind of sit there for a minute. Just like, whoa. The weight of it. I woke up the next morning and, again, excuse my language but just kind of like, what the fuck?! This cannot be real. This is … what? And I think it was that way for a couple of weeks."

Julie Manes, donor child: "It's devastating. It's changed my entire life. I've cried every day for the past two months. It's devastating to say the least. I believed for 34 years that my dad was my father. And he still is, but knowing that Cline did this is...horrible."

Elizabeth White, mother: "My first words were, 'I was raped 15 times, and I didn't even know it.'"

== In media ==
Donald Cline's fertility fraud is the subject of a Netflix documentary titled Our Father which premiered in May 2022.

== Personal life ==
Cline has four children, including Donna and Doug, with his wife, Audrey, in addition to the 94 other children conceived by artificially inseminating women with his own sperm without their knowledge or consent.

== See also ==
- Bernard Norman Barwin
- Fertility fraud
- Cecil Jacobson
- List of people with the most children
- Quiverfull
