= California criminal law =

California criminal law generally follows the law of the United States. However, there are both substantive and procedural differences between how the United States federal government and California prosecute alleged violations of criminal law. This article focuses exclusively on California criminal law.

== Types of crimes ==
California Penal Code section 15 defines a "crime" or "public offense" as "an act committed or omitted in violation of a law forbidding or commanding it, and to which is annexed, upon conviction, any of the following punishments:

1. Death;
2. Imprisonment;
3. Fine;
4. Removal from office; or,
5. Disqualification to hold and enjoy any office of honor, trust, or profit in this State."

California recognizes three categories of crime, distinguishable by the gravity of offense and severity of punishment: Felonies, Misdemeanors, and Infractions. Regardless of category or specific offense, all valid crimes are required to have two elements: 1) an act committed or omitted In California, and 2) an articulated punishment as defined in Cal Penal Code 15.

There are three different types of crimes and public offenses:

1. Infractions
2. Misdemeanors
3. Felonies.

If a person is found guilty or pled guilty to a felony and rather than a jail sentence, the court may Grant Probation and Suspend the Imposition of Sentence. In such cases, there is no "conviction" and no "crime", since none of the required punishments have been annexed.

=== Infractions ===
An infraction is a public offense, but arguably not a crime, and is not punishable by imprisonment. Any person convicted of an infraction may only be punished by a fine, removal and/or disqualification from public office. Typically, most infractions are punished with a fine only. Examples of infractions in California are traffic violations such as exceeding the posted speed limit, etc.

Persons charged with infractions do not have the same right to trial by jury as misdemeanor defendants, notwithstanding laws that imply otherwise. Similarly, Defendants generally do not have a right to court-appointed counsel. Infraction trials may be heard by non-judges, such as magistrates.

Infractions were created in 1968, originally only including parking violations, but was gradually broadened to include running stop lights and eventually most common traffic offenses. Beginning in 1993, those accused of parking violations cannot generally contest them in a court of law until exhausting administrative procedures. See, e.g.,

=== Misdemeanors ===
A misdemeanor is a crime punishable by imprisonment in a county or city jail or detention facility not to exceed one year. Except where the law specifies a different punishment, a misdemeanor is punishable by imprisonment in a county jail not exceeding six months and/or a fine not exceeding one thousand dollars. However, many misdemeanor offenses specifically list a punishment that exceeds the punishment listed in Penal Code section 19. For example, a misdemeanor violation of Battery on a Peace Officer is punishable by imprisonment in a county jail for up to one year and/or a two thousand dollar fine. Instead of imprisonment, most defendants have the option to serve probation, with restrictions set forth by the prosecuting attorney and, upon agreement with the defendant, and the courts.

=== Felonies ===
A felony crime is a more serious crime where the punishment of death or imprisonment in a state prison is annexed. A person found guilty of a felony can also be granted probation instead of a prison sentence. If a person is granted probation with Imposition of Sentence Suspended, the California Supreme Court in four different cases, Stephens v. Toomey 1959, People v. Banks 1953, People v. Howard, People v. Chavez 2018 has ruled there is no judgement of conviction. If a person is granted probation, the court can impose many conditions on a grant of probation (conditions of probations are not sentences), including up to one year in county jail, money fines up to the maximum allowed by state law, and restitution to the victim for actual losses. In addition, the court may impose other conditions as long as the conditions are reasonably related to the defendant's crime, or to future criminality.

A felony crime requires a finding of guilt and a punishment of Death or Imprisonment which is annexed upon conviction. See Cal Penal Code sections 15 and 16. Without Death or Imprisonment annexed upon a final judgment of conviction, there is no felony crime.

== See also ==
- Law of California
- California Penal Code
