= Our Father (2022 film) =

2022 American documentary

- Promotional poster
- Directed by: Lucie Jourdan
- Produced by: Jason Blum; Michael Petrella
- Music by: Gregory Tripi
- Production company: Blumhouse Television
- Distributed by: Netflix
- Release date: May 11, 2022
- Running time: 97 minutes
- Country: United States
- Language: English

Our Father is an American documentary film directed by Lucie Jourdan and produced by Michael Petrella and Jason Blum. Its story follows former Indianapolis-based fertility doctor Donald Cline, who, in a case of fertility fraud, used his own sperm to impregnate dozens of patients. The film was released on May 11, 2022. The film was watched for 42.60 million hours between May 8, 2022, and May 29, 2022, globally.

== Reception ==
Response to the film was positive.

On the review aggregator website Rotten Tomatoes, 77% of 31 critics' reviews are positive, with an average rating of 6.50/10.

=== Select reviews ===
- "Shocking, creepy, and—at times—just plain strange, Our Father is a documentary that proves sometimes the truth is stranger than fiction." —Collider
- "At its core, 'Our Father' is a lesson for any future true-crime documentaries—that such stories are strongest when their victims are front and center. While the execution muddies the film's message, the power of its subjects shines through the clouds." —Duke Chronicle
- "Director Lucie Jourdan's 'Our Father,' a frustrating, tawdry documentary, rips a headline for trashy dramatic beats." —RogerEbert.com
