= Haplarithmisis =

Haplarithmisis (Greek for haplotype numbering) is a conceptual process in Genetics that enables simultaneous haplotyping and copy-number profiling of DNA samples derived from cells. Haplarithmisis also reveals parental, segregation, and mechanistic origins of genomic anomalies. The resulting profiles of haplarithmisis are called parental haplarithms (i.e. paternal haplarithm and maternal haplarithm).

== Clinical Applications ==
Haplarithmisis enabled a new form of preimplantation genetic diagnosis, by which segmental and full chromosome anomalies could not only be detected but also traced back to meiosis or mitosis.

== Research Applications ==
In its first application in basic genome research, haplarithmisis led to discovery of parental genome segregation, a phenomenon that causes the segregation of entire parental genomes in distinct blastomere lineages causing cleavage-stage chimerism and mixoploidy.
