= DNA profiling (disambiguation) =

DNA profiling or genetic profiling mainly refers to DNA profiling in forensics.

Also, DNA profiling or genetic profiling may refer to various techniques in medicine, such as:

- Tests in medical genetics
- Preimplantation genetic diagnosis

== See also ==
- Full genome sequencing
