= David Rorvik =

American journalist and novelist (born 1943)

David Michael Rorvik (born 1943) is an American journalist and novelist who was the author of the 1978 book In his Image: The Cloning of a Man in which he claimed to have been part of a successful endeavor to create a clone of a human being. The book is widely considered to be a hoax.

== Biography ==
Rorvik was born in Circle, Montana. He graduated with a B.A. from the University of Montana in 1966 and a M.S. summa cum laude from the Columbia University Graduate School of Journalism in 1967. He worked as a science writer and a medical reporter for Time and contributed articles to numerous publications, including The New York Times, and wrote several books.

In a 1969 magazine article, Rorvik outlined the Shettles Method to influence the sex of a child. Two years later, he and Landrum B. Shettles co-authored the bestselling book Your Baby's Sex: Now You Can Choose. In 1976, Rorvik was awarded an Alicia Patterson Foundation Fellowship for investigatory reporting on the politics of cancer research worldwide. Some of his findings from this investigation were reported on in Harper's Magazine, the Washington Post and other publications. Earlier in his career, he was the recipient of a Pulitzer Traveling Fellowship for investigation of the effects of apartheid politics in Africa on press freedoms.

== In his Image ==
In In his Image, Rorvik claimed that in 1973 a wealthy businessman he dubbed "Max" had contacted him and recruited him to find scientists willing to create a clone of him. Rorvik claims to have formed a scientific team that was taken to a lab at a secret location. After a few years of experimentation they managed to implant a specially prepared body cell nucleus into the cytoplast of a human ovum (a technique known as somatic cell nuclear transfer) and, in turn, succeeded in implanting this egg into the uterus of a surrogate mother, a local resident called "Sparrow." A healthy child, it was claimed, was born nine months later. He stated in the book that he was able to tell the story only on the condition that he safeguard the identities of all involved and cautioned his readers that the book did not provide proof that the cloning had occurred, although he stated he was convinced that it had.

Before the book was published, the New York Post learned of the story and made it front-page news on March 3, 1978. Soon after, NBC's Tom Brokaw interviewed Rorvik on The Today Show. The book was very popular and caused much discussion about the ethics of cloning. However, scientists including Yale University professor Clement Markert generally disbelieved Rorvik's claims. Efforts to clone mammals had not been undertaken at that time and it was widely assumed that there would be enormous obstacles to achieving successful mammalian cloning.

British scientist Derek Bromhall filed a $7,000,000 defamation suit against Rorvik's publisher, J. B. Lippincott, alleging that the book was a hoax, that it incorporated parts of his doctoral thesis as the theoretical basis for the cloning process, and that it had used his name without permission. When Rorvik refused to reveal the identity of "Max" or provide proof of the existence of the clone, judge John Fullam found that the book was a "fraud and a hoax" in a pretrial ruling. The case went to trial in 1982, with the charges being reduced to invasion of privacy. The publisher soon entered into an out-of-court settlement that included a payment of $100,000 and a public representation that the book was a hoax. No evidence, however, was presented in pre-trial proceedings, during the trial, or thereafter that established either the truthfulness or the falsity of the book. Rorvik himself denied that there had been any hoax, and refused either to be party to the out-of-court settlement or to contribute to it financially. He wrote an article defending In his Image for Omni in 1980.

Rorvik has since written, ghost-written, edited and agented several books on diet and nutrition, psychology and other topics, including the Physician Desk Reference for Nutritional Supplements (2001). In 2006, a sixth edition of Your Baby's Sex: Now You Can Choose was published, marking nearly 40 years of continuous print.
