= Gender preference =

Gender preference may refer to:

- Sex selection, the attempt to influence the sex of the offspring
- Gender identity, personal identification of gender
