= Sex selection =

Artificial selection of the sex of offspring

Sex selection is the attempt to control the sex of the offspring to achieve a desired sex. It can be accomplished in several ways, both pre- and post-implantation of an embryo, as well as at childbirth. It has been marketed under the title family balancing.

According to the United Nations Population Fund, the reasons behind sex selection are due to three factors and provide an understanding for sex ratio imbalances as well as to project future trends. These factors are:

1. A preference for sons which stems from household structures "in which girls and women have a marginal social, economic and symbolic position, and consequently enjoy fewer rights." These household structures also focus on security in which sons are expected to provide support to their parents throughout their life;
2. Technological growth of prenatal diagnosis which allows parents to know the sex of their unborn child; and
3. Low fertility which increases the need for sex selection by reducing the probability of having a daughter in smaller families.

The United Nations Population Fund states that "Local fertility restrictions and spontaneous rapid fertility decline below replacement levels tend to compel parents who want both a son and a small family size to resort to sex selection."

== Preference for sex of child ==
In many cultures, male offspring are desired in order to inherit property, carry on the family name and to provide support for parents in old age.

In countries such as India, China, Indonesia and Nepal sons have been favored over daughters. According to a 2018 Gallup poll, American parents favor boys by a 36% to 28% margin. The results were similar to a survey in 1941, when Americans preferred a boy to a girl by a 38% to 24% margin. The overall preference was driven by men, of whom 43% preferred a son compared to 24% who preferred a daughter. Men's preference for sons was most pronounced among men aged 18 to 29. Women, on the other hand, showed no preference for either sex, with 31% stating that they preferred a girl and 30% responding that they favored a boy.

A 2009 study at the University of Ulster found that having sisters, as compared to brothers, can enhance the quality of an adult's life.

=== Cultural son preference ===
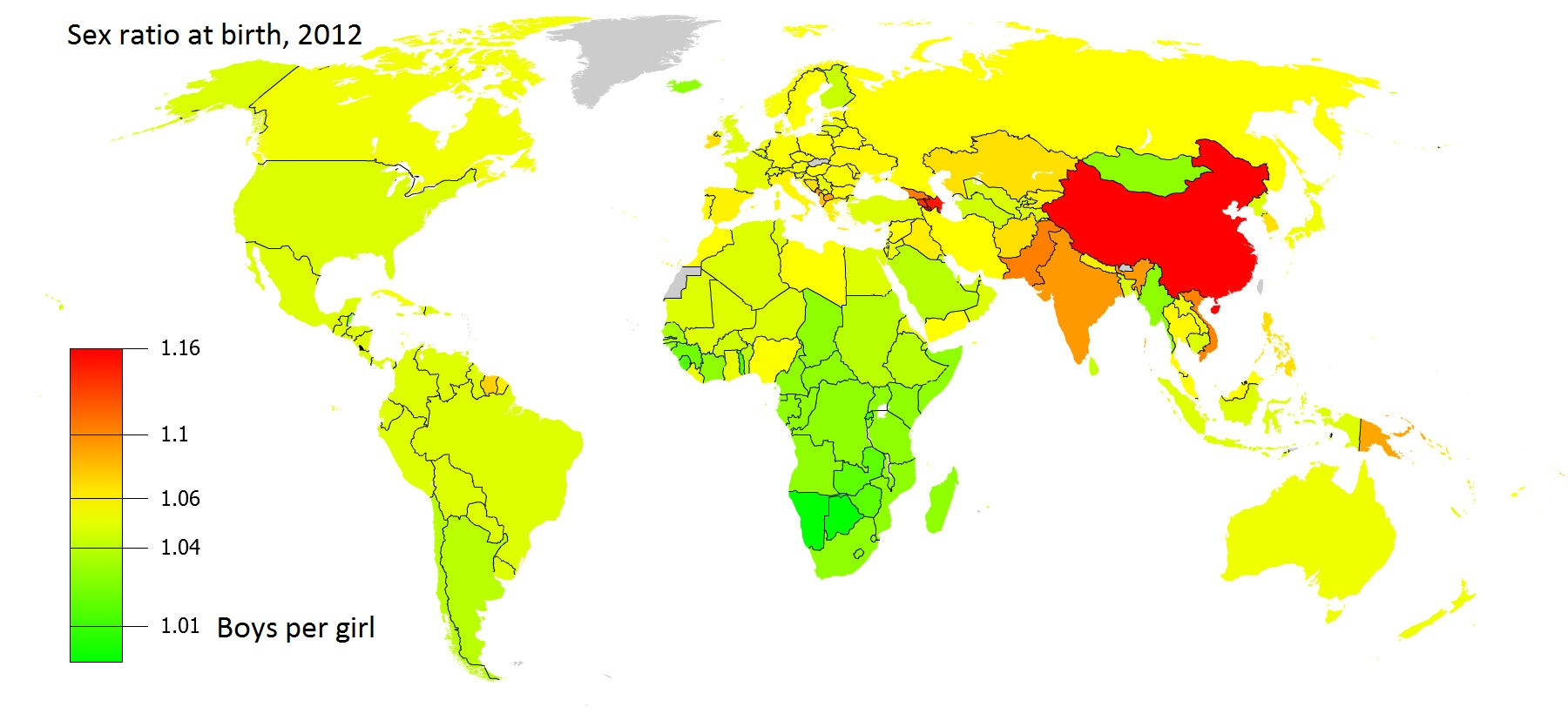
World map of birth sex ratios, 2012

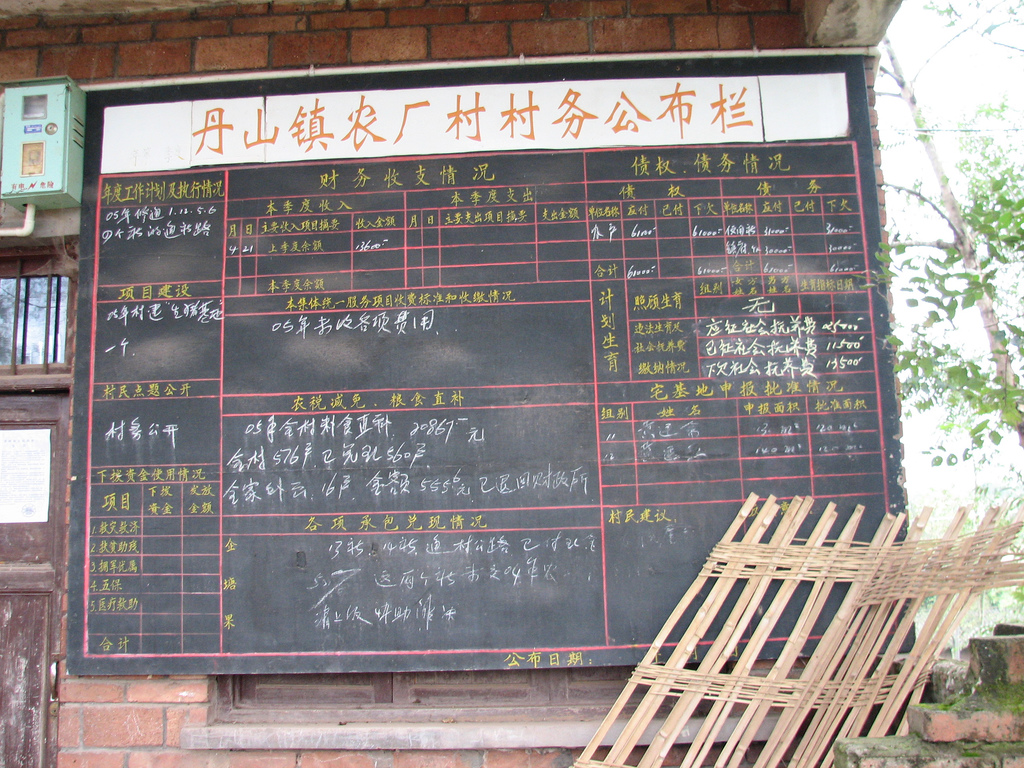
The one child policy in China has contributed to the imbalanced sex ratios. Image shows a community bulletin board in Nonguang Village, Sichuan province, China, keeping track of the town's female population, listing recent births by name and noting that several thousand yuan of fines for unauthorized births remain unpaid from the previous year.

There is a preference of parents to have a son over a daughter in many countries. This can be observed through sex ratios of children in various countries. Although biologically the sex ratio of children is around 95 girls to every 100 boys, this number generally evens out due to the higher infant mortality rate of boy infants. Scholars argue that the expected birth sex ratio in a normal population is in the range of 103 to 107 males to 100 females at birth. However, in a number of countries of South Asia, East Asia and the Caucasus, the sex ratio of children is severely distorted. The problem is particularly severe in China and India. The preference for sons over daughters can be connected to a number of reasons. In these countries, it is argued that son preference is linked to factors including economics, religion, and culture. Having a son ensures that families are more economically secure by not having to provide dowry payments, but rather being on the receiving end of this practice. In China, the one child policy has contributed to the sex imbalance, while the dowry system in India is responsible for a strong son preference. Furthermore, in countries where there are discriminatory practices regarding women inheriting, owning, or controlling land by law, having a son ensures that the family will not have to worry about the legal aftermath if something were to happen to them. It can also be argued that parents in these countries are aware of the potential hardship their daughter would have to endure in her lifetime, and therefore prefer to have a son in order not to see their daughter endure such difficulties. Many times this son preference results in female foeticide and pre-natal sex selection.

== Methods ==
=== Pre-implantation ===
Two major types of pre-implantation methods can be used for social sex selection. Both of them are based on actively rendering the second sex chromosome to be either a Y chromosome (resulting in a male), or an X chromosome (resulting in a female).

==== The Ericsson method ====
The Ericsson method, first applied in a clinical setting in the 1970s by Dr. Ronald J. Ericsson, uses higher concentrations of sperm of the desired sex to increase the likelihood of conceiving that sex.

When used to increase the likelihood of a female child, studies have resulted in between 70% and 80% female children. When used to increase the likelihood of a male child, studies have resulted in between 50% and 75% male children.

As of 2013, approximately 50 gender selection centers in the United States used the Ericsson Method for artificial gender selection. The Ericsson method separates male and female sperm by passing them through a column filled with blood protein, human serum albumin. As the sperms enter the human serum albumin, the differences in mass between the X and Y chromosomes manifest as the lighter male sperms push deeper into the protein than the females dragged down by the weight of the extra "leg" of the X sex chromosome. This tiny difference creates separate layers of concentrated male and female sperm. The layers of gender-selected sperm are of higher concentrations but not pure. This lack of purity explains the 30% chance of gender selection failure of the Ericsson method.

==== IVF/PGD technique ====
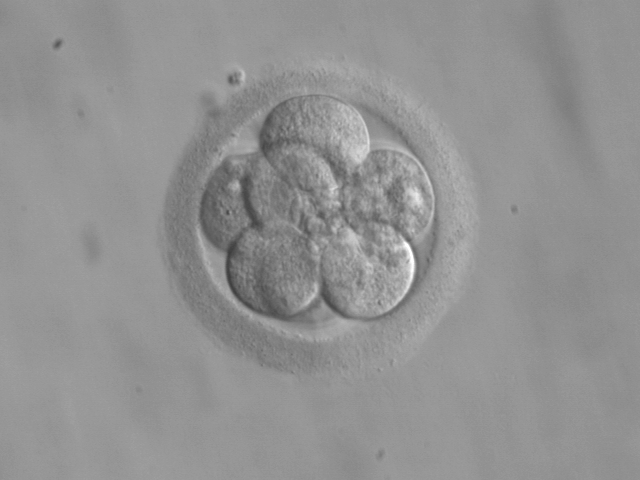
A 6-celled embryo prior to IVF/PGD analysis

After ovarian stimulation, multiple eggs are removed from the mother. The eggs are fertilized in the laboratory using the father's sperm in a technique called in vitro fertilization (IVF). "In vitro" is Latin for "within glass". Fertilized eggs are called embryos. As the embryos develop through mitosis, they are separated by sex. Embryos of the desired sex are implanted back in the mother's uterus.

Prior to fertilization with IVF, the fertilized eggs can be genetically biopsied with preimplantation genetic diagnosis (PGD) to increase fertilization success. Once an embryo grows to a 6-8 cell size, a small laser incision in the egg membrane (zona pellucida) allows safe removal of one of the cells. Every cell in the embryo contains an identical copy of the genome of the entire person. Removal of one of these cells does not harm the developing embryo. A Geneticist then studies the chromosomes in the extracted cells for genetic defects and for a definite analysis of the embryo's sex. Embryos of the desired sex and with acceptable genetics are then placed back into the mother.

The IVF/PGD technique is favored over the Ericsson method because of the stricter control of the sex of the offspring in the laboratory. Since only embryos of the desired sex are transferred to the mother, IVF/PGD avoids the small likelihood present in the Ericsson method of an undesired sperm fertilizing the egg. Sex selection success rates for IVF/PGD are very high. The technique is recommended for couples who will not accept a child of the undesired sex.

==== Timing methods ====
Timing methods aim to affect the sex ratio of the resultant children by having sexual intercourse at specific times as related to ovulation. Studies have not been consistent about whether timing methods have any influence on the sex of the baby, with some showing no correlation and others showing just the opposite.

- The Shettles method, first formally theorized in the 1960s by Landrum B. Shettles, proposes that sperm containing the X (female) chromosome are more resilient than sperm containing the Y (male) chromosome. The method advocates intercourse two to four days prior to ovulation. By the time ovulation occurs, the cervix should contain a higher concentration of female sperm still capable of fertilization (with most of the male sperm already dead). Intercourse close to ovulation, on the other hand, should increase the chances of conceiving a boy since the concentration of Y sperm will be higher at the height of the menstrual cycle.
- The Whelan method is an "intercourse timing" method that advocates the opposite of the Shettles method. The Whelan method suggests intercourse four to six days prior to ovulation to increase the likelihood of fertilization by male sperm.

==== Sperm sorting ====
Sperm sorting is an advanced technique that sorts sperm "in vitro" by flow cytometry. This shines a laser at the sperm to distinguish X and Y chromosomes, and can automatically separate the sperm out into different samples. During the early to mid 1980s, Dr. Glenn Spaulding was the first to sort viable whole human and animal spermatozoa using a flow cytometer, and utilized the sorted motile rabbit sperm for artificial insemination. Subsequently, the first patent application disclosing the method to sort "two viable subpopulations enriched for x- or y- sperm" was filed in April 1987 as US Application Serial Number 35,986 and later became part of US Patent 5,021,244; and the patent included the discovery of haploid expression (sex-associated membrane proteins, or SAM proteins) and the development of monoclonal antibodies to those proteins. Additional applications and methods were added, including antibodies, from 1987 through 1997. At the time of the patent filing, both Lawrence Livermore National Laboratories and the USDA were only sorting fixed sperm nuclei, after the Application Serial Number 35,986 patent filing a new technique was utilized by the USDA where "sperm were briefly sonicated to remove tails". USDA in conjunction with Lawrence Livermore National Laboratories, 'Beltsfield Sperm Sexing Technology' relies on the DNA difference between the X- and Y- chromosomes. Prior to flow cytometric sorting, semen is labeled with a fluorescent dye called Hoechst 33342 which binds to the DNA of each spermatozoon. As the X chromosome is larger (i.e. has more DNA) than the Y chromosome, the "female" (X-chromosome bearing) spermatozoa will absorb a greater amount of dye than its male (Y-chromosome bearing) counterpart. As a consequence, when exposed to UV light during flow cytometry, X spermatozoa fluoresce brighter than Y- spermatozoa. As the spermatozoa pass through the flow cytometer in single file, each spermatozoon is encased by a single droplet of fluid and assigned an electric charge corresponding to its chromosome status (e.g. X-positive charge, Y-negative charge). The stream of X- and Y- droplets is then separated by means of electrostatic deflection and collected into separate collection tubes for subsequent processing. The technology is already in commercial use for animal farming. It is currently being trialed on humans in the US under the trademark MicroSort; it claims a 90% success rate but is still considered experimental by the FDA.

=== Post-implantation ===
Sex selection after implantation can be performed by prenatal sex discernment, followed by sex-selective abortion of any offspring of the unwanted sex. For prenatal sex discernment, a blood test can be taken from the mother for testing of small amounts of fetal DNA within it, and has been estimated to be reliable more than 98% of the time, as long as the samples are taken after the seventh week of pregnancy.

=== Post-birth ===
Sex-selective infanticide - Killing children of the unwanted sex. Though illegal in most parts of the world, it is still practiced.

Sex-selective child abandonment - Abandoning children of the unwanted sex. Though illegal in most parts of the world, it is still practiced.

Sex-selective adoption - Placing children of the unwanted sex up for adoption. Less commonly viewed as a method of social sex selection, adoption affords families that have a gender preference a legal means of choosing offspring of a particular sex.

== Ethical concerns ==
The application of these techniques to humans creates moral and ethical concerns in the opinion of some, while the advantages of sensible use of selected technologies is favored by others.

In contrast, in an interview study, sex-selection technology providers generally argued that sex selection is an expression of reproductive rights, was initiated and pursued by women, and was a sign of female empowerment that allowed couples to make well-informed family planning decisions, prevented occurrences of unintended pregnancy and abortion, and minimized intimate partner violence and/or child neglect. The Ethics Committee of the American Society of Reproductive Medicine concluded that it is ethically appropriate to employ these new reproductive technologies to avoid the birth of children with X-linked genetic disorders. However, to use preimplantation genetic diagnosis and sex selection solely for non-medical reasons, the committee claims, is morally inappropriate. Also, primary care physicians questioned whether women could truly express free choice under pressure from family and community. In addition, primary care physicians voiced the concerns that sex selection led to invasive medical interventions in the absence of therapeutic indications, contributed to gender stereotypes that could result in child neglect of the lesser-desired sex, and was not a solution to domestic violence.

Post-conceptual selection by preimplantation testing (PGD) also involves preferential use of embryos, and termination of pregnancy for gender selection also raises many ethical questions of the abortion debate.

== Demographic concerns ==
In addition to the ethical concerns mentioned, issues of demographics arise in societies where social sex selection is common. A society may exhibit a widespread bias towards having children of a specific gender, either due to cultural biases or economic concerns (e.g. male children may be more employable in the future and thus provide more financial support). When combined with frequent social sex selection, this bias may produce a gender imbalance that has undesirable consequences. This phenomenon has been observed in many nations in the Far East, such as India and China, where social sex selection has produced unnaturally high male/female ratios in the population. Couples in these areas use reproductive technologies to choose the sex of their children, which ultimately leads to a skew the human sex ratio toward a disproportionately male population. Sex selection has also been detected in several countries of Eastern Europe such as Albania or Azerbaijan. A 2012 report by UNFPA estimates that the total gender gap due to prenatal and postnatal gender discrimination amounts to 117 million women. China's gender imbalance is further increased by the One Child Policy, although applicable only in most urban populations. In these nations, a lack of opportunity for many men to marry is believed to be producing increases in crime, demand for prostitution, mass emigration, and the selling of brides.

China's 'one child family' policy is considered largely responsible for the substantial imbalance of the sex ratio. Chinese government reports show that the sex ratio for newborns is 118:100 (boys: girls), higher in rural areas such as Guangdong and Hainan (130:100) compared to the average of 104:100 in developed countries. It is believed that the ratio would increase further to the point that, by 2020, men of marriageable age would be unable to find mates, resulting in large social problems.

Some nations, such as India, have attempted to curtail these gender imbalances with criminal statutes. In contrast, bioethicist Jacob Appel of New York University has argued that governments should pay couples to choose to have female children. According to Professor Appel, "if female babies [were] worth their weight in rupees and yuan, economic and educational opportunities for girls would soon follow."

In contrast, actual experience in Western cultures provides no evidence for any degree of gender imbalance from technologies which have long been available and legal – such as selective abortion or preimplantation embryo testing. When used for family balancing indications in such countries as the United States, pre-conceptual sex selection is widely sought without any preferential selection of males. A 1993 survey of more than 2300 pregnant women in the British population found no overall preference for either sex. These findings are largely consistent with other surveys conducted in the US. Thus the right of individual families to determine whether or not to balance gender of offspring in their families is not and will not become, in many countries, a demographic issue. Furthermore, in countries where such demographic issues exist because of strong gender preferences in a segment of the population, regulatory and legal control of, without denial of access to, sperm sorting technology can be utilized to provide individuals with choices while ensuring that equal numbers of boys and girls are produced for population demographic equality.

== History and folk beliefs ==
Sex selection is not new. There are a wide variety of social sex selections methods which have not been demonstrated to be effective. Because even implausible and ineffective methods have a success rate of 50%, many continued to be recommended by word of mouth.

The Greeks and Romans did not have a consistent theory of how sex was determined. Pliny the Elder claims that tying the right testicle of a ram will cause him to produce only females, but does not claim this about other creatures. Pseudo-Plutarch lists many Greek theories of sex determination, including heat and cold, left and right testicles, left and right sides of the body, sperm crossing or not crossing from one side of the womb to the other, and the strength or dominance of various body parts.

An 18th-century French book called The art of boys suggested an extreme method of ensuring children of one sex. The author suggests that one testicle and one ovary are intended for each sex. By removing a testicle or ovary, children of the other sex can be guaranteed.

Since the ancient China, Chinese people use Chinese Gender Chart to predict and select baby's gender. Chinese Gender Calendar was buried in an imperial mausoleum with a history of over 300 years. It was calculated and deduced by the ancient Chinese based on Yin-Yang, Five Elements, Eight Diagrams and time.

This calendar is a simple chart who matches the day of conception of the future child with the age of the mother at the day of conception. This table contains one more chance to conceive a boy. This may reflect the current female / male ratio.

Census data from India show an imbalance in sex ratios among children in the early 20th century, such disparities almost always reflect a preference for sons.

In the past, son preference may have resulted in the neglect or killing of female infants. However, since the early 1980s, ultrasounds and other technologies have enabled parents to detect the sex of a foetus during prenatal screenings. Those who prefer sons may arrange to abort female foetuses. This has accelerated sex-ratio imbalances at birth in parts of the world. It is estimated that, over the past generation, tens of millions of female foetuses have been aborted. Since the 1990s, some areas have seen up to 25 per cent more male births than female births. Sperm sorting utilizes the technique of flow cytometry to analyze and 'sort' spermatozoa. During the early to mid-1980s, Dr. Glenn Spaulding was the first to sort viable whole human and animal spermatozoa using a flow cytometer, and utilized the sorted motile rabbit sperm for artificial insemination. Subsequently, the first patent application disclosing the method to sort "two viable subpopulations enriched for x- or y- sperm" was filed in April 1987 as US Application Serial Number 35,986 and later became part of US Patent 5,021,244; and the patent included the discovery of haploid expression (sex-associated membrane proteins, or SAM proteins) and the development of monoclonal antibodies to those proteins. Additional applications and methods were added, including antibodies, from 1987 through 1997. At the time of the patent filing, both Lawrence Livermore National Laboratories and the USDA were only sorting fixed sperm nuclei, after the Application Serial Number 35,986 patent filing a new technique was utilized by the USDA where "sperm were briefly sonicated to remove tails". USDA in conjunction with Lawrence Livermore National Laboratories, 'Beltsfield Sperm Sexing Technology' relies on the DNA difference between the X- and Y- chromosomes. Prior to flow cytometric sorting, semen is labeled with a fluorescent dye called Hoechst 33342 which binds to the DNA of each spermatozoon. As the X chromosome is larger (i.e. has more DNA) than the Y chromosome, the "female" (X-chromosome bearing) spermatozoa will absorb a greater amount of dye than its male (Y-chromosome bearing) counterpart. As a consequence, when exposed to UV light during flow cytometry, X spermatozoa fluoresce brighter than Y- spermatozoa. As the spermatozoa pass through the flow cytometer in single file, each spermatozoon is encased by a single droplet of fluid and assigned an electric charge corresponding to its chromosome status (e.g. X-positive charge, Y-negative charge). The stream of X- and Y- droplets is then separated by means of electrostatic deflection and collected into separate collection tubes for subsequent processing. In 1994, the first British baby was born through gender selection Sophie-May Clark.

Recently, a study published in 2006 indicated that mothers with toxoplasmosis have a significantly higher sex ratio of boys to girls. This has been discussed in connection with the manipulation hypothesis of parasites. Another study found a link between sex and the diet of the mother, but this may be due to statistical chance, and has yet to be confirmed.

== Legality ==
Sex selection is illegal in most of the world. There is fertility tourism from the United Kingdom, Australia and Canada to the United States for sex selection, because preimplantation genetic diagnosis (PGD, a potential expansion of IVF), which can be used for sex selection, is prohibited in the UK, Australia and Canada, except when it is used to screen for genetic diseases, while the laws in the US are more relaxed in this subject.

Sex selection is illegal in China, but the Chinese government admits that the practice is widespread, especially in rural areas of China and among lawless groups such as ghettoized migrant workers in cities.

Sex selection is illegal in India. Prenatal determination of sex through ultrasound is also illegal in India. In 1994, the Pre-Conception and Pre-Natal Diagnostic Techniques Act banned prenatal sex determination, and was strengthened by an amendment in 2003. These laws were instituted to combat the prevalent practice of sex-selective abortion. Every genetic counselling centre, genetic laboratory or genetic clinic engaged in counselling or conducting pre-natal diagnostics techniques, like In vitro fertilisation (IVF) with the potential of sex selection (Preimplantation genetic diagnosis) before and after conception comes under purview of the PCPNDT Act and are banned. However, these laws have generally failed to be effective in rural areas and, despite education efforts, sex-selective abortion continues to be practiced in certain small parts of India.

== See also ==
- Femicide
- Gendercide
- Misogyny
- Sexism
- Violence against women
