= Ericsson method =

Sex-selection assisted reproductive technology

The Ericsson method is an assisted reproductive technology for sex selection, used before implantation. In this method, sperm that will give rise to male versus female children are separated by moving at different speeds through a protein solution.

When used to increase the likelihood of a female child, studies have resulted in between 70% and 80% female children.

When used to increase the likelihood of a male child, studies have resulted in between 50% and 75% male children.

== Method ==
The Ericsson method is based on the belief that X-sperm swim slower than Y-sperm. Sperm are placed atop a "column" of increasingly thicker layers of albumin, and allowed to swim down into the solution. After a certain time period has elapsed, the sperm can be separated into the faster and slower swimmers. If the couple desires a male baby the faster swimmers are artificially inseminated, and if the couple desires a female baby the same procedure is enacted with the slower swimmers.

This method differs from the Shettles method, which does not utilize artificial insemination.

== History ==
It was developed and patented by Dr. Ronald Ericsson. The method has been in use since the mid-1970s.
