= Embryo quality =

Estimation of embryo quality for in vitro fertilization

Embryo quality is the ability of an embryo to perform successfully in terms of conferring a high pregnancy rate and/or resulting in a healthy person. Embryo profiling is the estimation of embryo quality by qualification and/or quantification of various parameters. Estimations of embryo quality guides the choice in embryo selection in in vitro fertilization.

In general, embryo profiling for prediction of pregnancy rates focuses mainly on visual profiles and short-term biomarkers including expression of RNA and proteins, preferably in the surroundings of embryos to avoid any damage to them. On the other hand, embryo profiling for health prediction puts more focus on the genome, and where there is a risk of a genetic disorder it more often involves cell sampling from the embryo for preimplantation genetic diagnosis.

== Prediction of pregnancy rates ==
=== Microscopy ===
Embryo quality is mainly evaluated by microscopy at certain time points using a morphological scoring system. This has shown to significantly improve pregnancy rates. Assessment of morphological features as a reliable non-invasive method that provides valuable information in prediction of IVF/intra cytoplasmic sperm injection (ICSI) outcome has been frequently used as a scoring system of the embryo quality. The parameters for evaluation at day 2-3:

Number of cells and division rhythm: The optimal number of cells is 4 at day 2 and 8 at day 3 (A quality). In day 3 9-10 cells is B, >=10 is C (suboptimal) and <=4 is D (barely implant). A normal division rate is to double cell number each 24 hours. A higher rate implies chromosomal abnormalities and a lower rate entails possible embryo arrest (it is dying).

Fragmentation: happens due to cell apoptosis and can be quantified by the % of the embryo total volume occupied by fragments. Fragments are cytoplasm fractions without nuclei.

Cells symmetry and size: it is normal that all blastomeres had same or similar size in embryos with 2, 4 or 8 cells, while for the rest of embryos, a certain variety in cells size is normal. When the number of cells is impaired, if all of them have the same size, it is considered asymmetrical. Those embryos with one single large blastomere are considered abnormal and are associated with a high rate of polyploidy.

Multinucleation: multinucleated blastomeres on day 2 and day 3 is associated to a lower implantation rate. These embryos often are mosaics or with aneuploidy. It is more related to abnormalities on day 2 than on day 3.

Cytoplasm aspect: the presence of vesicles on day 3 is considered a sign of embryo genome activation and, therefore, of good prognosis. The presence of vacuoles is a sign of bad prognosis.

Time-lapse microscopy is an expansion of microscopy wherein the morphology of embryos is studied over time. As of 2014, time-lapse microscopy for embryo quality assessment is emerging from the experimental stage to something with enough evidence for broader clinical use. Studies using the EmbryoScope time-lapse incubator have used several indicators for embryo quality, such as direct cleavage from 1 to 3 cells, as well as the initiation of compaction and start of blastulation. Also, two-pronuclear zygotes (2PN) transitioning through 1PN or 3PN states tend to develop into poorer-quality embryos than those that constantly remain 2PN.

=== Molecular analysis ===
Molecular analysis can be performed by taking one of the cells from an embryo. The analysis can vary in extent from a single target biomarker to entire genomes, transcriptomes, proteomes and metabolomes. The results may be used to score embryos by comparing the patterns with ones that have previously been found among embryos in successful versus unsuccessful pregnancies:

==== Transcriptome profiling ====
In transcriptome evaluation, gene expression profiling studies of human embryos are limited due to legal and ethical issues.

Gene expression profiling of cumulus cells surrounding the oocyte and early embryo, or on granulosa cells, provides an alternative that does not involve sampling from the embryo itself. Profiling of cumulus cells can give valuable information regarding the efficiency of an ovarian hyperstimulation protocol, and may indirectly predict oocyte aneuploidy, embryo development and pregnancy outcomes, without having to perform any invasive procedure directly in the embryo.

In addition, microRNA (miRNA) and cell-free DNA (cfDNA) can be sampled from the vicinity of embryos, functioning as transcriptome-level-markers of embryo quality.

==== Proteome profiling ====
Proteome profiling of embryos can indirectly be evaluated by sampling of proteins found in the vicinity of embryos, thereby providing a non-invasive method of embryo profiling. Examples of protein markers evaluated in such profiling include CXCL13 and granulocyte-macrophage colony-stimulating factor, where lower protein amounts are associated with higher implantation rates. The presence of soluble HLA-G might be considered as another parameter if a choice has to be made between embryos of equal visible quality.

Another level of opportunity can be achieved by having the evaluation of the embryo profile tailored to the maternal status in regard to, for example health or immune status, potentially further detailed by similar profiling of the maternal genome, transcriptome, proteome and metabolome. Two examples of proteins that may be included in maternal profiling are endometrium-derived stathmin and annexin A2, whose down- and up-regulation, respectively, are associated with higher rates of successful implantation.

==== Genome profiling ====
A systematic review and meta-analysis of existing randomized controlled trials came to the result that there is no evidence of a beneficial effect of PGP as measured by live birth rate. On the contrary, for women of advanced maternal age, PGP significantly lowers the live birth rate. Technical drawbacks, such as the invasiveness of the biopsy, and chromosomal mosaicism are the major underlying factors for inefficacy of PGP.

A major drawback of genomic profiling for embryo quality is that the results generally rely on the assessment of a single cell, PGP has inherent limitations as the tested cell may not be representative of the embryo because of mosaicism.

When used for women of advanced maternal age and for patients with repetitive IVF failure, PGP is mainly carried out as a screening for detection of chromosomal abnormalities such as aneuploidy, reciprocal and Robertsonian translocations, and few cases for other abnormalities such as chromosomal inversions or deletions. The principle behind it is that, since it is known that numerical chromosomal abnormalities explain most of the cases of pregnancy loss, and a large proportion of the human embryos are aneuploid, the selective replacement of euploid embryos should increase the chances of a successful IVF treatment. Comprehensive chromosome analysis methods include array-comparative genomic hybridization (aCGH), quantitative PCR and SNP arrays. Combined with single blastomere biopsy on day-3 embryos, aCGH is very robust with 2.9% of tested embryos with no results, and associated with low error rates (1.9%). There is no evidence that testing the embryo for abnormal number of chromosomes increases the number of live births.

In addition to screening for specific abnormalities, techniques are in development that can avail for up to full genome sequencing, from which genetic profiling can score the DNA patterns by comparing with ones that have previously been found among embryos in successful or unsuccessful pregnancies.

== Health prediction ==
The main method currently used to predict the health of a resultant person of an embryo is preimplantation genetic diagnosis (also called preimplantation genetic screening, preimplantation genetic profiling or PGP), in order to determine whether the resultant person will inherit a specific disease or not. On the other hand, a systematic review and meta-analysis of existing randomized controlled trials came to the result that there is no evidence of a beneficial effect of PGP as measured by live birth rate. On the contrary, for women of advanced maternal age, PGP significantly lowers the live birth rate. Technical drawbacks, such as the invasiveness of the biopsy, and chromosomal mosaicism are the major underlying factors for inefficacy of PGP.
