= Haplarithm =

Parental (paternal and maternal) haplarithms are the outputs of haplarithmisis process. For instance, paternal haplarithm represents chromosome specific profile illuminating paternal haplotype of that chromosome (including homologous recombination between the two paternal homologous chromosomes) and the amount of those haplotypes. Importantly, the haplarithm signatures allow tracing back the genomic aberration to meiosis and/or mitosis.
