= Shettles method =

Hypothesized sex-selection method

The Shettles Method is a child conception idea that is reputed to help determine a baby's sex. It was developed by Landrum B. Shettles in the 1960s and was publicized in the book How to Choose the Sex of Your Baby, coauthored by Shettles and David Rorvik. The book was first published in 1971 and has been in print in various editions ever since. By following the various methods outlined in the book, it is proposed that a couple can affect the probability of having a boy or a girl.

== Concept ==
According to the hypothesis, male (Y) sperm are faster but more fragile than female (X) sperm. Further, acidic environments harm Y sperm, according to the theory, making conception of a girl more likely The Shettles method aims to exploit these two factors.

The Shettles method differs from the Ericsson method, in which the semen is deposited outside the woman and time is given for the fast/slow swimmers to separate before artificial insemination takes place.

=== Timing of intercourse ===
To have a boy, insemination should occur as close as possible to the moment of ovulation so that the faster, Y-sperm arrive first and achieve conception, according to the hypothesis. When seeking a girl, the couple should have sex 2½ to 3 days before ovulation.

=== Sexual position ===
Shallow penetration coupled with the sperm deposited close to the entrance favors female conception because the area is more acidic, which inhibits the weaker Y sperm, according to the hypothesis. To allow the Y sperm, which supposedly moves faster, to reach the egg first, use deeper penetration to deposit the sperm at the least acidic area near the uterus opening. Intercourse should occur from 5 am and continue every 2 hours during the ovulation period. Eggs are more likely to be fertilized before 7 am known as "the peak period".

== Effectiveness ==
Proponents claim between 75 and 90 percent effectiveness for the method.

May 19, 1998, Landrum B. Shettles, M.D., PhD dictated to his daughter, Lana B. Shettles-Callahan, an email reply to Professor Hunt concerning the presentation of choosing the sex of your baby with the following statement: “David M. Rorvik and I published in 1971 How to Choose Your Baby's Sex with revised editions in 1977, 1984, 1989, and 1997 in seventeen languages with worldwide distribution. To date, over one million copies have been sold and over 25,000 answers to the questions 'what you want' and 'what you got' with the approximate success rate of 85% for boys and 82% for girls. A bibliography of 129 references cites 28 papers of my own. The book has proven sound through the past 27 years; and, like the house in the scriptures, built on the rock rather than the sand.”

There is some disagreement among researchers as to how and whether the method works.

For example, the 1995 article "Timing of Sexual Intercourse in Relation to Ovulation—Effects on the Probability of Conception, Survival of the Pregnancy, and Sex of the Baby" in the New England Journal of Medicine concludes that "for practical purposes, the timing of sexual intercourse in relation to ovulation has no influence on the sex of the baby." The study tracked women's hormone levels daily to determine the day of ovulation.

In contrast, another study from the New England Journal of Medicine (1979) found that "[our] results ... demonstrate that insemination on different days of the menstrual cycle does lead to variations in sex ratio." While this second study was larger, it did not track the levels of LH in the blood but instead used cycle lengths to determine probable time of ovulation. Adding support to another aspect of the Shettles's findings related to sperm morphology, an important element in his method, a 1997 study, "Size Differences Between X and Y Spermatozoa and Prefertilization Diagnosis," published in Molecular Human Reproduction, using polymerase chain reaction-aided techniques, concluded: “Statistically, the length, perimeter and area of the sperm heads, and the length of the sperm necks and tails of X-bearing spermatozoa were significantly larger and longer than those of Y-bearing spermatozoa"

Multiple studies have confirmed Dr. Shettles's findings that the larger X-bearing, female producing spermatozoa are hardier, another factor that is important in his method. Men who work at high altitudes, in high heat environments and in situations that expose them to various toxic substances and other forms of physiological stress have been reported to sire far more girls than boys. OBGYN News, October 15–31, 1982, for example, reported on a study of undersea divers in Australia showing that their offspring were almost 2-1 female.

The researchers cited other data indicating a similar situation involving pilots of high-altitude military aircraft. Dr. Shettles contended that atmospheric pressures, tight fitting clothing and many other stressors could favor the X-bearing spermatozoa. Another study, reported upon in Discover Magazine in 1988 called "Girls from Space," found that both high altitude tactical pilots and astronauts fathered far more daughters than sons.

A 2006 letter published by The BMJ, however, reviewing some of the research, claims that "So far, researchers have found no morphological differences between human X sperm and Y sperm", ignoring prior findings to the contrary, including some published in the same journal just the year before.

A May 2021 article in Fertility & Sterility reflected on a paper published in the same journal 50 years earlier that month, stating that "...scientific journals such as Fertility and Sterility and The New England Journal of Medicine have continued to publish research dispelling the claims of the Shettles Method."
