= Landrum Shettles =

American biology researcher

Landrum Brewer Shettles
- Born: November 21, 1909; Pontotoc, Mississippi, U.S.
- Died: February 6, 2003 (aged 93); St. Petersburg, Florida, U.S.
- Education: Mississippi College (BS); Johns Hopkins University (MS, PhD)
- Occupation: Fertility
- Known for: In vitro fertilization
- Spouse: Priscilla Elinor Schmidt (divorced)

Landrum Brewer Shettles (November 21, 1909 – February 6, 2003) was an American obstetrician/gynecologist and a pioneer in the field of in vitro fertilization.

== Early life and education ==
Shettles was born in Pontotoc County, Mississippi about a mile and a half west of Friendship Community, just East of John's Creek. His father's name was Brazil Manly and his mother was Sue Mounce Shettles. He married Priscella Elinor Schmidt on December 18, 1948, and they had seven children. He served the Major Medical Corps., Army of the United States, 1944 to 1946.

He took his BA degree from Mississippi College in 1933 with special distinction; Doctor of Science from Mississippi College in 1966; Master of Science of the Fellow from the University of New Mexico in 1933–1934; he received his Ph.D. degree from Johns Hopkins in 1937; and MD degree in 1943. He was a Diplomate of the American Board of Obstetrics and Gynecology, Diplomate of the North American Section of Obstetrics and Gynecology, the Pan American Medical Association.

== Career ==
Shettles was an associate professor of Obstetrics and Gynecology at Columbia University's College of Physicians and Surgeons 1951-1973 and 1974–1975, the Director of the New York Fertility Foundation.

He is co-author From Conception to Birth: The Drama of Life’s Beginnings. He pioneered some of the earliest research into in vitro fertilization and has authored scores of scientific papers published in international medical journals related to fertility issues, conception, embryogenesis and sex selection. A full bibliography of Shettles writings is available. He was the developer of gamete intrafallopian transfer (GIFT), a breakthrough in fertility research

Shettles developed the Shettles Method of sex selection that helps prospective parents conceive a child of the desired gender. To achieve this end, it utilizes a number of factors that differentially favor one gender or the other, including timing of intercourse relative to ovulation time, position during sex and other factors. The 1971 book, How to Choose the Sex of Your Baby, co-authored with science writer David Rorvik has been in print for a continuous 50 years and has been translated into many different languages, with about 2 million copies of the book in various editions sold worldwide.

Shettles became Chief of Obstetrics and Gynecology in the Gifford Memorial Hospital in Randolph, Vermont 1975 to 1981. Then he moved to Las Vegas where he was in the Starr Clinic in Las Vegas, Nevada 1981 and 1982 and then in the Oasis Clinic in Las Vegas in 1982 to 1985. Then Shettles was an Attending Staff at Columbia Sunrise Medical Center 1994 until 2000 when he retired and moved to Florida to live with his daughter, Lana B. Shettles-Callahan, BFA, where they both worked on Pictures Of Life's Beginnings Until Birth - Pictorial Atlas (not yet in print). Shettles daughter, Lana B. Shettles-Callahan, BFA, compiled Shettles written material and photos to build a website for his book with David M. Rorvik, How to Choose The Sex of Your Baby: fully revised and updated, which describes the Shettles method. Shettles died on February 6, 2003, in St. Petersburg, Florida.

== Works ==
- Landrum B. Shettles; David M. Rorvik (23 March 2011). How to Choose the Sex of Your Baby: Fully revised and updated. Crown Publishing Group. ISBN 978-0-307-78617-3.
- Ovum Humanum, Hafner Pub. Co., 1960
- Roberts Rugh, Landrum B. Shettles, Richard Einhorn, From Conception to Birth: The Drama of Life's Beginnings, Harper Row, 1971
- Publications by Landrum B. Shettles, M.D., Ph.D., F.A.C.O.G., F.A.C.S., F.R.S.H. listed on his website, landrumshettles.com

== See also ==
- Andrology
- Shettles Method
