= Preimplantation genetic diagnosis =

Genetic profiling of embryos prior to implantation

1♂︎—Sperm is collected from a male. 1♀︎—Eggs are collected from a female by a thin needle passed either through vagina or through abdomen under ultrasound guidance [transvaginal or transabdominal ultrasound aspiration]. 2a—The sperm and eggs are fertilized. 2b—The resulting embryos are kept safe and watched to see which will thrive. 3a—The embryos are allowed to develop; those that thrive are given identifiers. 3b—A genetic test is run on each embryo for a given trait and the results are matched with the embryos. 4—The embryos without the desired trait are identified and discarded. 5—The remaining embryos are allowed to grow to the point that they can be implanted. 6a—The embryos with the desired trait are implanted. 6b—The embryos result in a healthy pregnancy. 6c—Fraternal twins with the desired trait, not expressed in their mother, are born.

Preimplantation genetic diagnosis (PGD or PIGD) is the genetic profiling of embryos prior to implantation (as a form of embryo profiling), and sometimes even of oocytes prior to fertilization. PGD is considered in a similar fashion to prenatal diagnosis. When used to screen for a specific genetic disease, its main advantage is that it avoids selective abortion, as the method makes it highly likely that the baby will be free of the disease under consideration. PGD thus is an adjunct to assisted reproductive technology, and requires in vitro fertilization (IVF) to obtain oocytes or embryos for evaluation. Embryos are generally obtained through blastomere or blastocyst biopsy. The latter technique has proved to be less deleterious for the embryo, therefore it is advisable to perform the biopsy around day 5 or 6 of development.

The world's first PGD was performed by Handyside, Kontogianni and Winston at the Hammersmith Hospital in London. "Female embryos were selectively transferred in five couples at risk of X-linked disease, resulting in two twin and one singleton pregnancy."

The term preimplantation genetic screening (PGS) refers to the set of techniques for testing whether embryos (obtained through IVF/ ICSI have an abnormal number of chromosomes (aneuploidy). PGS is also called aneuploidy screening. PGS was renamed preimplantation genetic diagnosis for aneuploidy (PGD-A) by the Preimplantation Genetic Diagnosis International Society (PGDIS) in 2016.

The PGD allows studying the DNA of eggs or embryos to select those that carry certain mutations for genetic diseases. It is useful when there are previous chromosomal or genetic disorders in the family and within the context of in vitro fertilization programs.

The procedures may also be called "preimplantation genetic profiling" to adapt to the fact that they are sometimes used on oocytes or embryos prior to implantation for other reasons than diagnosis or screening.

Procedures performed on sex cells before fertilization may instead be referred to as methods of oocyte selection or sperm selection, although the methods and aims partly overlap with PGD.

== History ==
In 1968, Robert Edwards and Richard Gardner reported the successful identification of the sex of rabbit blastocysts. It was not until the 1980s that human IVF was fully developed, which coincided with the breakthrough of the highly sensitive polymerase chain reaction (PCR) technology. Handyside, Kontogianni, and Winston's first successful preimplantation diagnostic tests took place in October 1989, with the first births in 1990, though the preliminary experiments had been published some years earlier. In these first cases, PCR was used for sex determination of patients carrying X-linked diseases. A 2001 report on worldwide use of PGD since 1990 noted that embryo or polar body biopsies had occurred in more than 3000 clinical cycles, with a 24% pregnancy rate — comparable to assisted reproductive practices not involving biopsy.

=== First clinical cases ===
Elena Kontogianni was studying for her PhD at the Hammersmith Hospital, on single-cell PCR for sexing, which she did by amplifying a repeated region of the Y chromosome. It was this approach that she used for the world's first PGD cases.

Female embryos were selectively transferred in five couples at risk of X-linked disease, resulting in two twins and one singleton pregnancy. Because the Y chromosome region Kontogianni was amplifying contained many repeats, it was more efficient than trying to amplify a unique region. A band on the PCR gel indicated that the embryo was male and the absence of a band indicated that the embryo was female. However, amplification failure or an anucleate blastomere also resulted in absence of a band on the PCR gel. To reduce the risk of misdiagnosis, Kontogianni went on to co-amplify sequences on the X and Y (Kontogianni et al., 1991). At that time nothing was known about allele dropout, cumulus cell contamination, or amplification failure from single cells. During the 1980s, human IVF embryos were exclusively transferred on day two of development as the culture medium used was incapable of reliably growing embryos past this stage. Since the biopsy was to be performed on day three, the first diagnoses were all performed in one day, with transfer of the embryos late on day three. A comparison of day two and day three transfers indicated that this would not adversely affect pregnancy rates. The worry of embryos arresting was so high that some transfers took place in the early hours of day four so that the embryos were removed from culture as soon as possible. There were many evenings at the Hammersmith when a transfer was performed at 1 a.m. on day four and researchers returned to the laboratory at 7 a.m. to start the next case. Winston helped deliver most of the first PGD babies.

PGD became increasingly popular during the 1990s when it was used to determine a handful of severe genetic disorders, such as sickle-cell anemia, Tay–Sachs disease, Duchenne's muscular dystrophy, and beta-thalassemia.

== Indications and applications ==
PGD is used primarily for genetic disease prevention, by selecting only those embryos that do not have a known genetic disorder. PGD may also be used to increase chances of successful pregnancy, to match a sibling in HLA type in order to be a donor, to have less cancer predisposition, and for sex selection.

PGD is frequently employed for the detection of autosomal dominant, autosomal recessive, and X-linked abnormalities. However, its utilization in screening for mitochondrial disorders is less common, primarily due to the unpredictable characteristics of mitochondrial heteroplasmy. In cases of mitochondrial heteroplasmy, some mitochondria within a cell bear the mutation, while others do not. The ratio of mutant mitochondria plays a crucial role in determining both the expression of the disease (its impact on offspring) and the severity of the disease.

=== Monogenic disorders ===
PGD is available for a large number of monogenic disorders—that is, disorders due to a single gene only (autosomal recessive, autosomal dominant or X-linked)—or of chromosomal structural aberrations (such as a balanced translocation). PGD helps these couples identify embryos carrying a genetic disease or a chromosome abnormality, thus avoiding diseased offspring. The most frequently diagnosed autosomal recessive disorders are cystic fibrosis, Beta-thalassemia, sickle cell disease and spinal muscular atrophy type 1. The most common dominant diseases are myotonic dystrophy, Huntington's disease and Charcot–Marie–Tooth disease; and in the case of the X-linked diseases, most of the cycles are performed for fragile X syndrome, haemophilia A and Duchenne muscular dystrophy. Though it is quite infrequent, some centers report PGD for mitochondrial disorders or two indications simultaneously.

PGD is also now being performed in a disease called hereditary multiple exostoses (MHE/MO/HME).

In addition, there are infertile couples who carry an inherited condition and who opt for PGD as it can be easily combined with their IVF treatment.

=== Pregnancy chances ===
Preimplantation genetic profiling (PGP) has been suggested as a method to determine embryo quality in in vitro fertilization, in order to select an embryo that appears to have the greatest chances for successful pregnancy. However, as the results of PGP rely on the assessment of a single cell, PGP has inherent limitations as the tested cell may not be representative of the embryo because of mosaicism. Furthermore, a study found that diagnoses of the biopsies from the same embryos at two separate laboratories matched up only 50% of the time.

A systematic review and meta-analysis of existing randomized controlled trials came to the result that there is no evidence of a beneficial effect of PGP as measured by live birth rate. On the contrary, for women of advanced maternal age, PGP significantly lowers the live birth rate. Technical drawbacks, such as the invasiveness of the biopsy, and chromosomal mosaicism are the major underlying factors for inefficacy of PGP. Normal live births of healthy offspring after transfers of embryos deemed aneuploid by PGP have been reported worldwide.

Alternative methods to determine embryo quality for prediction of pregnancy rates include microscopy as well as profiling of RNA and protein expression.

=== HLA matching ===
Human leukocyte antigen (HLA) typing of embryos, so that the child's HLA matches a sick sibling, availing for cord-blood stem cell donation. The child is in this sense a "savior sibling" for the recipient child. HLA typing has meanwhile become an important PGD indication in those countries where the law permits it. The HLA matching can be combined with the diagnosis for monogenic diseases such as Fanconi anaemia or beta thalassemia in those cases where the ailing sibling is affected with this disease, or it may be exceptionally performed on its own for cases such as children with leukaemia. The main ethical argument against is the possible exploitation of the child, although some authors maintain that the Kantian imperative is not breached since the future donor child will not only be a donor but also a loved individual within the family.

=== Cancer predisposition ===
A more recent application of PGD is to diagnose late-onset diseases and (cancer) predisposition syndromes. Since affected individuals remain healthy until the onset of the disease, frequently in the fourth decade of life, there is debate on whether or not PGD is appropriate in these cases. Considerations include the high probability of developing the disorders and the potential for cures. For example, in predisposition syndromes, such as BRCA mutations which predispose the individual to breast cancer, the outcomes are unclear. Although PGD is often regarded as an early form of prenatal diagnosis, the nature of the requests for PGD often differs from those of prenatal diagnosis requests made when the mother is already pregnant. Some of the widely accepted indications for PGD would not be acceptable for prenatal diagnosis.

=== For late-onset conditions ===
A woman carrying the gene for early-onset Alzheimer's disease used preimplantation genetic diagnosis (PGD) to ensure that her child would not inherit this condition. Ethical questions arise regarding the decision to allow an individual aware of their own susceptibility to a late-onset disease to have a child free of the gene, despite the risk that the child may lose a parent prematurely. Some argue that this decision is ethical, asserting that the desire for reproduction is as legitimate for these individuals as for others seeking infertility services. Comparisons are drawn with other medical situations, such as assisted reproduction for individuals with HIV or other serious illnesses. Although the child may face risks of early bereavement, the argument put forth is that the psychological trauma does not render the child's life devoid of clear benefits. Therefore, assisting parents in reproducing in these circumstances is not considered to cause undue or unnecessary suffering to the child.

=== Sex discernment ===
Preimplantation genetic diagnosis provides a method of prenatal sex discernment even before implantation, and may therefore be termed preimplantation sex discernment. Potential applications of preimplantation sex discernment include:

- A complement to specific gene testing for monogenic disorders, which can be very useful for genetic diseases whose presentation is linked to the sex, such as, for example, X-linked diseases.
- Ability to prepare for any sex-dependent aspects of parenting.
- Sex selection. A 2006 survey found that 42 per cent of clinics that offer PGD have provided it for sex selection for non-medical reasons. Nearly half of these clinics perform it only for "family balancing", which is where a couple with two or more children of one sex desire a child of the other, but half do not restrict sex selection to family balancing. In India, this practice has been used to select only male embryos although this practice is illegal. Opinions on whether sex selection for non-medical reasons is ethically acceptable differ widely, as exemplified by the fact that the ESHRE Task Force could not formulate a uniform recommendation.

In the case of families at risk for X-linked diseases, patients are provided with a single PGD assay of gender identification. Gender selection offers a solution to individuals with X-linked diseases who are in the process of getting pregnant. The selection of a female embryo offspring is used in order to prevent the transmission of X-linked Mendelian recessive diseases. Such X-linked Mendelian diseases include Duchenne muscular dystrophy (DMD), and hemophilia A and B, which are rarely seen in females because the offspring is unlikely to inherit two copies of the recessive allele. Since two copies of the mutant X allele are required for the disease to be passed on to the female offspring, females will at worst be carriers for the disease but may not necessarily have a dominant gene for the disease. Males on the other hand only require one copy of the mutant X allele for the disease to occur in one's phenotype and therefore, the male offspring of a carrier mother has a 50% chance of having the disease. Reasons may include the rarity of the condition or because affected males are reproductively disadvantaged. Therefore, medical uses of PGD for selection of a female offspring to prevent the transmission of X-linked Mendelian recessive disorders are often applied. Preimplantation genetic diagnosis applied for gender selection can be used for non-Mendelian disorders that are significantly more prevalent in one sex. Three assessments are made prior to the initiation of the PGD process for the prevention of these inherited disorders. In order to validate the use of PGD, gender selection is based on the seriousness of the inherited condition, the risk ratio in either sex, or the options for disease treatment.

=== Minor disabilities ===
PGD has occasionally been used to select an embryo for the presence of a particular disease or disability, such as deafness, in order that the child would share that characteristic with the parents.

=== Non-medical traits ===
The potential controversial use of PGD could arise with genetic tests targeting non-medical traits such as hearing, sexual orientation, height, beauty, or intelligence. Some tests, like those for GJB2 mutations linked to hereditary deafness, might lead to requests for PGD to avoid or favor these traits. Ethical concerns include potential harm to affected communities, such as the deaf. Similar questions would arise with a genetic test for sexual orientation, raising concerns about discrimination. Some insist on a complete ban on selecting such traits, fearing more serious implications like genetic engineering of offspring. However, definitive judgments on these issues cannot be made until such tests are closer to practical reality.

== Classification ==
There are three distinguished types of Preimplantation Genetic Testing (PGT) depending on the defects evaluated.

PGT-A, also called preimplantational genetic screening (PGS), improves pregnancy rates by allowing the discard of aneuploids and the selection of euploid embryos for transfer. Euploid embryos are more likely to implant and develop into a healthy pregnancy. NGS and FISH are the most frequently techniques used for the diagnosis of monosomies, trisomies and poliploidies. Primary candidates for PGT-A can include the following:

- Women of advanced maternal age
- Couples with a history of recurrent pregnancy loss
- Couples with repeated IVF failure
- Male partners with severe male factor infertility.

PGT-A is particularly beneficial for women of advanced maternal age. As women age, especially beyond 35 years, the quality of their eggs declines due to an increased risk of errors during the meiotic division of oocytes. These errors lead to chromosomal abnormalities, such as aneuploidies (monosomies, trisomies, and polyploidies), which can impair embryo development and result in failed pregnancies or genetic disorders.

Because of this, PGT-A has become an essential tool for identifying and selecting euploid embryos (embryos with the correct number of chromosomes) for transfer, significantly improving the chances of a successful pregnancy. Studies have shown that the probability of chromosomal abnormalities increases with maternal age, making PGT-A an important step in fertility treatments like in vitro fertilization (IVF) for older women.

PGT-M evaluates monogenic diseases are being evaluated in the embryo. Monogenic disorders are caused by single-gene mutations (autosomal recessive, autosomal dominant, X-linked). Previously, PCR was used for PGT-M. Recently, array and NGS technology are used.

PGT-SR takes every structural abnormality in the chromosome into account (translocations, inversions, duplications, insertions, deletions). Techniques used include PCR, FISH and NGS.

== Technical aspects ==
PGD is a form of genetic diagnosis performed prior to implantation. This implies that the patient's oocytes should be fertilized in vitro and the embryos kept in culture until the diagnosis is established. It is also necessary to perform a biopsy on these embryos in order to obtain material on which to perform the diagnosis. The diagnosis itself can be carried out using several techniques, depending on the nature of the studied condition. Generally, PCR-based methods are used for monogenic disorders and FISH for chromosomal abnormalities and for sexing those cases in which no PCR protocol is available for an X-linked disease. These techniques need to be adapted to be performed on blastomeres and need to be thoroughly tested on single-cell models prior to clinical use. Finally, after embryo replacement, surplus good quality unaffected embryos can be cryopreserved, to be thawed and transferred back in a next cycle.

=== Obtaining embryos ===
Currently, all PGD embryos are obtained by assisted reproductive technology, although the use of natural cycles and in vivo fertilization followed by uterine lavage was attempted in the past and is now largely abandoned. In order to obtain a large group of oocytes, the patients undergo controlled ovarian stimulation (COH). COH is carried out either in an agonist protocol, using gonadotrophin-releasing hormone (GnRH) analogues for pituitary desensitisation, combined with human menopausal gonadotrophins (hMG) or recombinant follicle-stimulating hormone (FSH), or an antagonist protocol using recombinant FSH combined with a GnRH antagonist according to clinical assessment of the patient's profile (age, body mass index (BMI), endocrine parameters). hCG is administered when at least three follicles of more than 17 mm mean diameter are seen at transvaginal ultrasound scan. Transvaginal ultrasound-guided oocyte retrieval is scheduled 36 hours after hCG administration. Luteal phase supplementation consists of daily intravaginal administration of 600 μg of natural micronized progesterone.

Oocytes are carefully denudated from the cumulus cells, as these cells can be a source of contamination during the PGD if PCR-based technology is used. In the majority of the reported cycles, intracytoplasmic sperm injection (ICSI) is used instead of IVF. The main reasons are to prevent contamination with residual sperm adhered to the zona pellucida and to avoid unexpected fertilization failure. The ICSI procedure is carried out on mature metaphase-II oocytes and fertilization is assessed 16–18 hours after. The embryo development is further evaluated every day prior to biopsy and until transfer to the woman's uterus. During the cleavage stage, embryo evaluation is performed daily on the basis of the number, size, cell-shape and fragmentation rate of the blastomeres. On day 4, embryos were scored in function of their degree of compaction and blastocysts were evaluated according to the quality of the throphectoderm and inner cell mass, and their degree of expansion.

=== Biopsy procedures ===
As PGD can be performed on cells from different developmental stages, the biopsy procedures vary accordingly. Theoretically, the biopsy can be performed at all preimplantation stages, but only three have been suggested: on unfertilised and fertilised oocytes (for polar bodies, PBs), on day three cleavage-stage embryos (for blastomeres) and on blastocysts (for trophectoderm cells).

The biopsy procedure always involves two steps: the opening of the zona pellucida and the removal of the cells. There are different approaches to both steps, including mechanical, chemical, and physical (Tyrode's acidic solution) and laser technology for the breaching of the zona pellucida, extrusion or aspiration for the removal of PBs and blastomeres, and herniation of the trophectoderm cells.

==== Polar body biopsy ====
A polar body biopsy is the sampling of a polar body, which is a small haploid cell that is formed concomitantly as an egg cell during oogenesis, but which generally does not have the ability to be fertilized. Compared to a blastocyst biopsy, a polar body biopsy can potentially be of lower costs, less harmful side-effects, and more sensitive in detecting abnormalities. The main advantage of the use of polar bodies in PGD is that they are not necessary for successful fertilisation or normal embryonic development, thus ensuring no deleterious effect for the embryo. One of the disadvantages of PB biopsy is that it only provides information about the maternal contribution to the embryo, which is why cases of maternally inherited autosomal dominant and X-linked disorders that are exclusively maternally transmitted can be diagnosed, and autosomal recessive disorders can only partially be diagnosed. Another drawback is the increased risk of diagnostic error, for instance due to the degradation of the genetic material or events of recombination that lead to heterozygous first polar bodies.

==== Cleavage-stage biopsy (blastomere biopsy) ====
Cleavage-stage biopsy is generally performed the morning of day three post-fertilization, when normally developing embryos reach the eight-cell stage. The biopsy is usually performed on embryos with less than 50% of anucleated fragments and at an eight-cell or later stage of development. A hole is made in the zona pellucida and one or two blastomeres containing a nucleus are gently aspirated or extruded through the opening. The main advantage of cleavage-stage biopsy over PB analysis is that the genetic input of both parents can be studied. On the other hand, cleavage-stage embryos are found to have a high rate of chromosomal mosaicism, putting into question whether the results obtained on one or two blastomeres will be representative for the rest of the embryo. It is for this reason that some programs utilize a combination of PB biopsy and blastomere biopsy. Furthermore, cleavage-stage biopsy, as in the case of PB biopsy, yields a very limited amount of tissue for diagnosis, necessitating the development of single-cell PCR and FISH techniques. Although theoretically PB biopsy and blastocyst biopsy are less harmful than cleavage-stage biopsy, this is still the prevalent method. It is used in approximately 94% of the PGD cycles reported to the ESHRE PGD Consortium. The main reasons are that it allows for a safer and more complete diagnosis than PB biopsy and still leaves enough time to finish the diagnosis before the embryos must be replaced in the patient's uterus, unlike blastocyst biopsy. Of all cleavage-stages, it is generally agreed that the optimal moment for biopsy is at the eight-cell stage. It is diagnostically safer than the PB biopsy and, unlike blastocyst biopsy, it allows for the diagnosis of the embryos before day 5. In this stage, the cells are still totipotent and the embryos are not yet compacting. Although it has been shown that up to a quarter of a human embryo can be removed without disrupting its development, it still remains to be studied whether the biopsy of one or two cells correlates with the ability of the embryo to further develop, implant, and grow into a full-term pregnancy.

Not all methods of opening the zona pellucida have the same success rate because the well-being of the embryo and blastomere may be impacted by the procedure used for the biopsy. Zona drilling with acid Tyrode's solution (ZD) was looked at in comparison to partial zona dissection (PZD) to determine which technique would lead to more successful pregnancies and have less of an effect on the embryo and/or blastomere. ZD uses a digestive enzyme like pronase which makes it a chemical drilling method. The chemicals used in ZD may have a damaging effect on the embryo. PZD uses a glass microneedle to cut the zona pellucida which makes it a mechanical dissection method that typically needs skilled hands to perform the procedure. In a study that included 71 couples, ZD was performed in 26 cycles from 19 couples and PZD was performed in 59 cycles from 52 couples. In the single-cell analysis, there was a success rate of 87.5% in the PZD group and 85.4% in the ZD group. The maternal age, number of oocytes retrieved, fertilization rate, and other variables did not differ between the ZD and PZD groups. It was found that PZD led to a significantly higher rate of pregnancy (40.7% vs 15.4%), ongoing pregnancy (35.6% vs 11.5%), and implantation (18.1% vs 5.7%) than ZD. This suggests that using the mechanical method of PZD in blastomere biopsies for preimplantation genetic diagnosis may be more proficient than using the chemical method of ZD. The success of PZD over ZD could be attributed to the chemical agent in ZD having a harmful effect on the embryo and/or blastomere. Currently, zona drilling using a laser is the predominant method of opening the zona pellucida. Using a laser is an easier technique than using mechanical or chemical means. However, laser drilling could be harmful to the embryo and it is very expensive for in vitro fertilization laboratories to use especially when PGD is not a prevalent process as of modern times. PZD could be a viable alternative to these issues.

==== Blastocyst biopsy ====
In an attempt to overcome the difficulties related to single-cell techniques, it has been suggested to biopsy embryos at the blastocyst stage, providing a larger amount of starting material for diagnosis. It has been shown that if more than two cells are present in the same sample tube, the main technical problems of single-cell PCR or FISH would virtually disappear. On the other hand, as in the case of cleavage-stage biopsy, the chromosomal differences between the inner cell mass and the trophectoderm (TE) can reduce the accuracy of diagnosis, although this mosaicism has been reported to be lower than in cleavage-stage embryos.

TE biopsy has been shown to be successful in animal models such as rabbits, mice and primates. These studies show that the removal of some TE cells is not detrimental to the further in vivo development of the embryo.

Human blastocyst-stage biopsy for PGD is performed by making a hole in the ZP on day three of in vitro culture. This allows the developing TE to protrude after blastulation, facilitating the biopsy. On day five post-fertilization, approximately five cells are excised from the TE using a glass needle or laser energy, leaving the embryo largely intact and without loss of inner cell mass. After diagnosis, the embryos can be replaced during the same cycle, or cryopreserved and transferred in a subsequent cycle.

There are two drawbacks to this approach, due to the stage at which it is performed. First, only approximately half of the preimplantation embryos reach the blastocyst stage. This can restrict the number of blastocysts available for biopsy, limiting in some cases the success of the PGD. McArthur and coworkers report that 21% of the started PGD cycles had no embryo suitable for TE biopsy. This figure is approximately four times higher than the average presented by the ESHRE PGD consortium data, where PB and cleavage-stage biopsy are the predominant reported methods. On the other hand, delaying the biopsy to this late stage of development limits the time to perform the genetic diagnosis, making it difficult to redo a second round of PCR or to rehybridize FISH probes before the embryos should be transferred back to the patient.

==== Cumulus cell sampling ====
Sampling of cumulus cells can be performed in addition to a sampling of polar bodies or cells from the embryo. Because of the molecular interactions between cumulus cells and the oocyte, gene expression profiling of cumulus cells can be performed to estimate oocyte quality and the efficiency of an ovarian hyperstimulation protocol, and may indirectly predict aneuploidy, embryo development and pregnancy outcomes.

=== Non-invasive methods ===
Traditional embryo biopsy can be invasive and costly. Therefore, researchers have an ongoing quest to find a less invasive methods for preimplantation genetic testing. Studies on new non-invasive preimplantation genetics screening methods such as blastocoel fluid and spent embryo media have recently been published as an alternative to traditional methods.

==== Using blastocoel fluid ====
During a normal IVF process, good practice to vitrify embryos increases the chance of a healthy pregnancy. During the process of vitrification a developed blast is dehydrated and it and its blastocoel cavity collapses for the freezing process. There are many methods that have been used to facilitate the collapse including laser-pulse, repeated micropipetting, microneedle puncture or microsuction. Normally this fluid would then be discarded, however with preimplantation genetic testing of BL, this fluid is saved and then tested for DNA. This DNA is thought to be from cells that have gone through apoptosis found in the developing embryo.

==== Using blastocyst culture conditioned medium ====
Another method for less invasive preimplantation genetic testing involves testing the culture media the embryo has developed in. It has been noted that the embryo releases DNA fragments from the cells that have died within the incubation period. With this knowledge, scientists have reasoned that they could isolate this DNA and use it for preimplantation genetic testing.

==== Benefits and consequences ====
While there is conflicting evidence as to whether or not the more traditional methods of preimplantation genetic testing are harmful to the embryo, there are newer methods for less invasive and equally effective testing methods using blastocoel fluid and spent embryo media. Two problems with these alternatives are the minimal amount of DNA there is to work with and whether or not this technology is accurate. Both of these concerns were recently addressed by Kuznyetsov, who decided to use both methods, combining the amount of DNA retrieved from both techniques. Once the DNA was isolated it was used for preimplantation genetic testing. The results showed that when both methods (blastocyst fluid and embryo spent media) were used in combination, they showed a cordance rate for the whole chromosome copy of 87.5% when compared to the trophectoderm, 96.4% when compared to the whole blastocyst (gold standard). Additionally after amplification using this new method they were able to produce 25.0–54.0 ng/ul of DNA per sample. With traditional methods such as trophectoderm they collected 10 to 44 ng/ul.

=== Genetic analysis techniques ===
Fluorescent in situ hybridization (FISH) and polymerase chain reaction (PCR) are the two commonly used, first-generation technologies in PGD. PCR is generally used to diagnose monogenic disorders and FISH is used for the detection of chromosomal abnormalities (for instance, aneuploidy screening or chromosomal translocations). Over the past few years, various advancements in PGD testing have allowed for an improvement in the comprehensiveness and accuracy of results available depending on the technology used. Recently a method was developed allowing to fix metaphase plates from single blastomeres. This technique in conjunction with FISH, m-FISH can produce more reliable results, since analysis is done on whole metaphase plates

In addition to FISH and PCR, single cell genome sequencing is being tested as a method of preimplantation genetic diagnosis. This characterizes the complete DNA sequence of the genome of the embryo.

==== FISH ====
FISH is the most commonly applied method to determine the chromosomal constitution of an embryo. In contrast to karyotyping, it can be used on interphase chromosomes, so that it can be used on PBs, blastomeres and TE samples. The cells are fixated on glass microscope slides and hybridised with DNA probes. Each of these probes are specific for part of a chromosome, and are labelled with a fluorochrome.

Dual FISH was considered to be an efficient technique for determination of the sex of human preimplantation embryos and the additional ability to detect abnormal chromosome copy numbers, which is not possible via the polymerase chain reaction (PCR).

Currently, a large panel of probes are available for different segments of all chromosomes, but the limited number of different fluorochromes confines the number of signals that can be analysed simultaneously.

The type and number of probes that are used on a sample depends on the indication. For sex determination (used for instance when a PCR protocol for a given X-linked disorder is not available), probes for the X and Y chromosomes are applied along with probes for one or more of the autosomes as an internal FISH control. More probes can be added to check for aneuploidies, particularly those that could give rise to a viable pregnancy (such as a trisomy 21). The use of probes for chromosomes X, Y, 13, 14, 15, 16, 18, 21 and 22 has the potential of detecting 70% of the aneuploidies found in spontaneous abortions.

In order to be able to analyse more chromosomes on the same sample, up to three consecutive rounds of FISH can be carried out. In the case of chromosome rearrangements, specific combinations of probes have to be chosen that flank the region of interest. The FISH technique is considered to have an error rate of 5–10%.

The main problem of the use of FISH to study the chromosomal constitution of embryos is the elevated mosaicism rate observed at the human preimplantation stage. A meta-analysis of more than 800 embryos came to the result that approximately 75% of preimplantation embryos are mosaic, of which approximately 60% are diploid–aneuploid mosaic and approximately 15% aneuploid mosaic. Li and co-workers found that 40% of the embryos diagnosed as aneuploid on day 3 turned out to have a euploid inner cell mass at day 6. Staessen and collaborators found that 17.5% of the embryos diagnosed as abnormal during PGS, and subjected to post-PGD reanalysis, were found to also contain normal cells, and 8.4% were found grossly normal. As a consequence, it has been questioned whether the one or two cells studied from an embryo are actually representative of the complete embryo, and whether viable embryos are not being discarded due to the limitations of the technique. Nevertheless, mosaic embryos can be transferred but only if there are not euploids available, having previously informed patients about the risks and doing a prenatal diagnose preferably.

==== PCR ====
Kary Mullis conceived PCR in 1985 as an in vitro simplified reproduction of the in vivo process of DNA replication. Taking advantage of the chemical properties of DNA and the availability of thermostable DNA polymerases, PCR allows for the enrichment of a DNA sample for a certain sequence. PCR provides the possibility to obtain a large quantity of copies of a particular stretch of the genome, making further analysis possible. It is a highly sensitive and specific technology, which makes it suitable for all kinds of genetic diagnosis, including PGD. Currently, many different variations exist on the PCR itself, as well as on the different methods for the posterior analysis of the PCR products.

When using PCR in PGD, one is faced with a problem that is nonexistent in routine genetic analysis: the minute amounts of available genomic DNA. As PGD is performed on single cells, PCR has to be adapted and pushed to its physical limits, and use the minimum amount of template possible: which is one strand. This implies a long process of fine-tuning of the PCR conditions and a susceptibility to all the problems of conventional PCR, but several degrees intensified. The high number of needed PCR cycles and the limited amount of template makes single-cell PCR very sensitive to contamination. Another problem specific to single-cell PCR is the allele drop out (ADO) phenomenon. It consists of the random non-amplification of one of the alleles present in a heterozygous sample. ADO seriously compromises the reliability of PGD as a heterozygous embryo could be diagnosed as affected or unaffected depending on which allele would fail to amplify. This is particularly concerning in PGD for autosomal dominant disorders, where ADO of the affected allele could lead to the transfer of an affected embryo.

Several PCR-based assays have been developed for various diseases like the triplet repeat genes associated with myotonic dystrophy and fragile X in single human somatic cells, gametes and embryos.

==== Next-generation sequencing concept ====
The core philosophy of massive parallel sequencing used in NGS is adapted from shotgun sequencing developed to sequence longer sections of DNA. NGS technologies read the target DNA templates randomly. The target DNA or entire genome is broken into small pieces and then those DNA pieces are ligated to designated adapters for random reading during in-parallel DNA synthesis. The read length corresponds to the actual number of continuous sequenced bases. The read lengths are much shorter than with Sanger sequencing, which is why NGS results are called short reads.

From 2014, next-generation sequencing (NGS) has been used in the PGT. NGS is a group of techniques capable of sequencing DNA cost-efficiently, providing a view of the complete embryo genome, including mitochondrial DNA. Those techniques rely on sequencing short reads around 400 bases each and overlapping these reads with alignment software.

Likewise, NGS is used to detect aneuploidies in the 24 chromosomes and single-gene defects when there is an indication from the carrier parents. The main advantage is that NGS can combine the detection of both aneuploidies and monogenic diseases with a single biopsy and has reduced affordable costs, making it more accessible.

Two examples of NGS are the pyrosequencing and the reversible dye terminator.

=== Pyrosequencing ===
Pyrosequencing technique is based on sequencing by-synthesis principle and on the detection of released pyrophosphate during DNA synthesis. It employs a series of four enzymes to accurately detect nucleic acid sequences during the synthesis.

Cycles of four deoxynucleotide triphosphates (dNTPs) are separately added to the reaction mixture iteratively. The cascade starts with a nucleic acid polymerization reaction in which inorganic pyrophosphate is released as a result of nucleotide incorporation by polymerase. Each nucleotide incorporation event is followed by release of inorganic pyrophosphate in a quantity equimolar to the amount of incorporated nucleotide. The released pyrophosphate is quantitatively converted to ATP by ATP sulfurylase in the presence of APS. The generated ATP drives the luciferase-mediated conversion of luciferin to oxyluciferin, producing visible light in amounts that are proportional to the amount of ATPs. During this synthesis process, the DNA strand is extended by complementary nucleotides, and the DNA sequence is demonstrated by the pyrogram on a screen. The overall reaction from polymerization to light detection takes place within 3–4 seconds at room temperature. ATP sulfurylase converts pyrophosphate to ATP in approximately 1.5 seconds and the generation of light by luciferase takes place in less than 0.2 seconds.

=== Limits ===
Along with the benefits offered by these technologies, there are a number of challenges, both technical and ethical that must be addressed and solved before NGS technologies enter the clinical arena of embryo diagnosis. One limitation will be the interpretation of the massive sequence data generated by NGS technologies. Background polymorphisms must be distinguished from potentially disease-causing mutations and copy number variations. By selective recovery and subsequent sequencing of genomic loci of interest, generated data and efforts for analysis can be reduced significantly compared with a whole-genome sequencing approach.

=== Establishing a diagnosis ===
The establishment of a diagnosis in PGD is not always straightforward. The criteria used for choosing the embryos to be replaced after FISH or PCR results are not equal in all centres. In the case of FISH, in some centres only embryos are replaced that are found to be chromosomally normal (that is, showing two signals for the gonosomes and the analysed autosomes) after the analysis of one or two blastomeres, and when two blastomeres are analysed, the results should be concordant. Other centres argue that embryos diagnosed as monosomic could be transferred, because the false monosomy (i.e. loss of one FISH signal in a normal diploid cell) is the most frequently occurring misdiagnosis. In these cases, there is no risk for an aneuploid pregnancy, and normal diploid embryos are not lost for transfer because of a FISH error. Moreover, it has been shown that embryos diagnosed as monosomic on day 3 (except for chromosomes X and 21), never develop to blastocyst, which correlates with the fact that these monosomies are never observed in ongoing pregnancies.

Diagnosis and misdiagnosis in PGD using PCR have been mathematically modelled in the work of Navidi and Arnheim and of Lewis and collaborators. The most important conclusion of these publications is that for the efficient and accurate diagnosis of an embryo, two genotypes are required. This can be based on a linked marker and disease genotypes from a single cell or on marker/disease genotypes of two cells. An interesting aspect explored in these papers is the detailed study of all possible combinations of alleles that may appear in the PCR results for a particular embryo. The authors indicate that some of the genotypes that can be obtained during diagnosis may not be concordant with the expected pattern of linked marker genotypes, but are still providing sufficient confidence about the unaffected genotype of the embryo. Although these models are reassuring, they are based on a theoretical model, and generally the diagnosis is established on a more conservative basis, aiming to avoid the possibility of misdiagnosis. When unexpected alleles appear during the analysis of a cell, depending on the genotype observed, it is considered that either an abnormal cell has been analysed or that contamination has occurred, and that no diagnosis can be established. A case in which the abnormality of the analysed cell can be clearly identified is when, using a multiplex PCR for linked markers, only the alleles of one of the parents are found in the sample. In this case, the cell can be considered as carrying a monosomy for the chromosome on which the markers are located, or, possibly, as haploid. The appearance of a single allele that indicates an affected genotype is considered sufficient to diagnose the embryo as affected, and embryos that have been diagnosed with a complete unaffected genotype are preferred for replacement. Although this policy may lead to a lower number of unaffected embryos suitable for transfer, it is considered preferable to the possibility of a misdiagnosis.

=== Preimplantation genetic haplotyping ===
Preimplantation genetic haplotyping (PGH) is a PGD technique wherein a haplotype of genetic markers that have statistical associations to a target disease are identified rather than the mutation causing the disease.

Once a panel of associated genetic markers have been established for a particular disease it can be used for all carriers of that disease. In contrast, since even a monogenic disease can be caused by many different mutations within the affected gene, conventional PGD methods based on finding a specific mutation would require mutation-specific tests. Thus, PGH widens the availability of PGD to cases where mutation-specific tests are unavailable.

PGH also has an advantage over FISH in that FISH is not usually able to make the differentiation between embryos that possess the balanced form of a chromosomal translocation and those carrying the homologous normal chromosomes. This inability can be seriously harmful to the diagnosis made. PGH can make the distinction that FISH often cannot. PGH does this by using polymorphic markers that are better suited at recognizing translocations. These polymorphic markers are able to distinguish between embryos that carried normal, balanced, and unbalanced translocations. FISH also requires more cell fixation for analysis whereas PGH requires only transfer of cells into polymerase chain reaction tubes. The cell transfer is a simpler method and leaves less room for analysis failure.

=== Embryo transfer and cryopreservation of surplus embryos ===
Embryo transfer is usually performed on day three or day five post-fertilization, the timing depending on the techniques used for PGD and the standard procedures of the IVF centre where it is performed.

With the introduction in Europe of the single-embryo transfer policy, which aims at the reduction of the incidence of multiple pregnancies after ART, usually one embryo or early blastocyst is replaced in the uterus. Serum hCG is determined at day 12. If a pregnancy is established, an ultrasound examination at 7 weeks is performed to confirm the presence of a fetal heartbeat. Couples are generally advised to undergo PND because of the, albeit low, risk of misdiagnosis.

It is not unusual that after the PGD, there are more embryos suitable for transferring back to the woman than necessary. For the couples undergoing PGD, those embryos are very valuable, as the couple's current cycle may not lead to an ongoing pregnancy. Embryo cryopreservation and later thawing and replacement can give them a second chance to pregnancy without having to redo the cumbersome and expensive ART and PGD procedures.

== Side effects to embryo ==
PGD/PGS is an invasive procedure that requires a serious consideration, according to Michael Tucker, Ph.D., Scientific Director and Chief Embryologist at Georgia Reproductive Specialists in Atlanta. One of the risks of PGD includes damage to the embryo during the biopsy procedure (which in turn destroys the embryo as a whole), according to Serena H. Chen, M.D., a New Jersey reproductive endocrinologist with IRMS Reproductive Medicine at Saint Barnabas. Another risk is cryopreservation where the embryo is stored in a frozen state and thawed later for the procedure. About 20% of the thawed embryos do not survive. There has been a study indicating a biopsied embryo has a less rate of surviving cryopreservation. Another study suggests that PGS with cleavage-stage biopsy results in a significantly lower live birth rate for women of advanced maternal age. Also, another study recommends the caution and a long term follow-up as PGD/PGS increases the perinatal death rate in multiple pregnancies.

In a mouse model study, PGD has been attributed to various long-term risks, including a weight gain and memory decline; a proteomic analysis of adult mouse brains showed significant differences between the biopsied and the control groups, of which many are closely associated with neurodegenerative disorders like Alzheimer's and Down syndrome.

== Ethical issues ==
PGD has raised ethical issues, although this approach could reduce reliance on fetal deselection during pregnancy. The technique can be used for prenatal sex discernment of the embryo, and thus potentially can be used to select embryos of one sex in preference of the other in the context of "family balancing". The use of PGD for gender variety has been reported in India, where an IVF programme in Bombay is now providing PGD to select male offspring as the second child of couples who have already had a daughter. Because of the importance of a male heir in India, those couples might have resorted to abortion if pregnant with a female fetus (even though illegal for that purpose). In that setting PGD for sex selection for gender variety appears to be justified. It may be possible to make other "social selection" choices in the future that introduce socio-economic concerns. Only unaffected embryos are implanted in a woman's uterus; those that are affected are either discarded or donated to science.

Objections to PGD based on its effect on embryos replay debates over abortion and embryo status that have occurred in many other contexts, from abortion to embryonic stem cell research. People who think that the embryo or fetus is a person will object to creating and destroying embryos, and oppose most uses of PGD. Others believe that preimplantation embryos are too rudimentary in development to have interests or rights, but that they deserve special respect as the first stage toward a new person.

PGD has the potential to screen for genetic issues unrelated to medical necessity, such as intelligence and beauty, and against negative traits such as disabilities. The medical community has regarded this as a counterintuitive and controversial suggestion. The prospect of a "designer baby" is closely related to the PGD technique, creating a fear that increasing frequency of genetic screening will move toward a modern eugenics movement. Empirical research suggests that public moral evaluations often reflect the distinction drawn in bioethics between therapeutic and enhancement uses of reproductive genetic technologies. In a nationally representative experimental study conducted in Germany, applications described as reducing the risk of disease were significantly more accepted than applications described as increasing the likelihood of higher cognitive functioning. This pattern is consistent with broader discussions in bioethics that distinguish between treatment and enhancement. On the other hand, a principle of procreative beneficence is proposed, which is a putative moral obligation of parents in a position to select their children to favor those expected to have the best life. An argument in favor of this principle is that traits (such as empathy, memory, etc.) are "all-purpose means" in the sense of being of instrumental value in realizing whatever life plans the child may come to have. Walter Veit has argued that there is no intrinsic moral difference between 'creating' and 'choosing' a life, thus making eugenics a natural consequence of accepting the principle of procreative beneficence.

=== Disabilities ===
In 2006, three percent of PGD clinics in the US reported having selected an embryo for the presence of a disability. Couples involved were accused of purposely harming a child. This practice is notable in dwarfism, where parents intentionally create a child who is a dwarf. In the selection of a saviour sibling to provide a matching bone marrow transplant for an already existing affected child, there are issues including the commodification and welfare of the donor child.

By relying on the result of one cell from the multi-cell embryo, PGD operates under the assumption that this cell is representative of the remainder of the embryo. This may not be the case as the incidence of mosaicism is often relatively high. On occasion, PGD may result in a false negative result leading to the acceptance of an abnormal embryo, or in a false positive result leading to the deselection of a normal embryo.

Another problematic case is the cases of desired non-disclosure of PGD results for some genetic disorders that may not yet be apparent in a parent, such as Huntington disease. It is applied when patients do not wish to know their carrier status but want to ensure that they have offspring free of the disease. This procedure can place practitioners in questionable ethical situations, e.g. when no healthy, unaffected embryos are available for transfer and a mock transfer has to be carried out so that such patients do not suspect that they are carriers. The European Society of Human Reproduction and Embryology (ESHRE) ethics task force currently recommends using exclusion testing instead. Exclusion testing is based on a linkage analysis with polymorphic markers, in which the parental and grandparental origin of the chromosomes can be established. This way, only embryos are replaced that do not contain the chromosome derived from the affected grandparent, avoiding the need to detect the mutation itself.

==== Criticisms of PGD ====
Because of the sensitivity of the issue, preimplantation genetic diagnosis has sparked a rich debate in academia and beyond.

Those who are against the possibility of discarding an embryo to avoid the risk of disability (such as the possible adverse selection of embryos that might develop "disabilities" such as deafness) argue that if the only two possibilities are "existence and nonexistence" ("coming into the world" or "not coming into the world"), granting them the right to come into the world is better than the alternative of not existing.

Another widely used argument for rejecting preimplantation genetic diagnosis involves the meaning of the term "disability" (Bickenach & Chatterji, 2003). The language of medicine describes disability as something whose functionalities deviate from a normal functioning. However, much of the disability community emphasizes that disability is often determined by the way society structures the world. Thus, the concepts of "normalcy" and "health" are relative and depend on time, place, and society. Opponents of PGD argue against avoiding the birth of people with disabilities through preimplantation genetic diagnosis, and that people must first determine how to define what disability is.

==== Support for PGD ====
The literature highlights three most common types of arguments in favor of preimplantation genetic diagnosis. The first type of argument is mainly made by a part of academia that believes that a disability or disorder likely implies a reduced quality of life for the unborn child. The second most common type of argument focuses primarily on the duties of parents in relation to the human flourishing of the individual. This argument feeds on the idea that parents have an obligation and responsibility to ensure minimum living conditions for the unborn child.

A final category of argument is one that emphasizes the importance of bringing individuals with disabilities and disorders into the world with the consideration of how much they can contribute to the socioeconomic growth of society, suggesting these individuals would not be able to contribute to improving the status quo and well-being of society as a whole.

==== Legal status ====
In Japan, preimplantation genetic testing-monogenic (PGT-M) has been the topic of fierce debate by individuals suffering from genetic diseases on the one hand, and feminist groups and disability activist groups on the other. As Croydon notes, "prospective PGT-M patients, such as individuals of reproductive age impacted by a disability and their spouses...have wanted to take advantage of the technology," but they have faced opposition from "groups campaigning for women's and disabled people's rights [which] include individuals who see the genetic testing of embryos in one or all of the following ways: 1) it puts undue pressure on the women involved, conveying the message to them that they are only allowed to reproduce if they are bringing into the world a healthy offspring; 2) it reinforces existing discriminatory attitudes in society towards disabled people; and 3) the circumvention of disease through the reproductive process reduces the need in the scientific community to continue the pursuit of developing treatments/cures for people who currently live with disability." Ultimately, the use of PGT-M has remained restrictive in Japan and is informally regulated by the Japan Society of Obstetrics and Gynecology (JSOG).

=== Intersex traits ===
PGD allows discrimination against those with intersex traits. Georgiann Davis argues that such discrimination fails to recognize that many people with intersex traits led full and happy lives. Morgan Carpenter highlights the appearance of several intersex variations in a list by the Human Fertilisation and Embryology Authority of "serious" "genetic conditions" that may be de-selected in the UK, including 5-alpha reductase deficiency and androgen insensitivity syndrome, traits evident in elite women athletes and "the world's first openly intersex mayor". Organisation Intersex International Australia has called for the Australian National Health and Medical Research Council to prohibit such interventions, noting a "close entanglement of intersex status, gender identity and sexual orientation in social understandings of sex and gender norms, and in medical and medical sociology literature".

In 2015, the Council of Europe published an Issue Paper on Human rights and intersex people, remarking:

Intersex people's right to life can be violated in discriminatory "sex selection" and "preimplantation genetic diagnosis, other forms of testing, and selection for particular characteristics". Such de-selection or selective abortions are incompatible with ethics and human rights standards due to the discrimination perpetrated against intersex people on the basis of their sex characteristics.

=== Savior siblings ===
PGD combined with HLA (human leukocyte antigen) matching allows couples to select for embryos that are unaffected with a genetic disease in hopes of saving an existing, affected child. The "savior sibling" would conceivably donate life-saving tissue that is compatible to his/her brother or sister. Some ethicists argue that the "savior siblings" created from this procedure would be treated as commodities. Another argument against selecting for "savior siblings" is that it leads to genetically engineered "designer babies". This argument prompts a discussion between the moral distinction of enhancing traits and preventing disease. Finally, opponents of "savior siblings" are concerned with the welfare of the child, mainly that the procedure will cause emotional and psychological harm to the child.

Currently in the United States, no formal regulation or guideline exists. The ethical decisions regarding this procedure is in the discretion of health care providers and their patients. In contrast, the UK's use of PGD is regulated by the Human Fertilization and Embryology Act (HFEA), which requires clinics performing this technique to attain a license and follow strict criteria.

== Religious objections ==
Some religious organizations disapprove of this procedure. The Roman Catholic Church, for example, takes the position that it involves the destruction of human life. and besides that, opposes the necessary in vitro fertilization of eggs as contrary to Aristotelian principles of nature. Orthodox Judaism, by contrast, supports PGD. Survey research has found that higher levels of religiosity are associated with lower moral acceptance of reproductive genetic technologies, including polygenic embryo screening.

== Psychological factor ==
A meta-analysis that was performed indicates research studies conducted in PGD underscore future research. This is due to positive attitudinal survey results, postpartum follow-up studies demonstrating no significant differences between those who had used PGD and those who conceived naturally, and ethnographic studies which confirmed that those with a previous history of negative experiences found PGD as a relief. Firstly, in the attitudinal survey, women with a history of infertility, pregnancy termination, and repeated miscarriages reported having a more positive attitude towards preimplantation genetic diagnosis. They were more accepting towards pursuing PGD. Secondly, likewise to the first attitudinal study, an ethnographic study conducted in 2004 found similar results. Couples with a history of multiple miscarriages, infertility, and an ill child, felt that preimplantation genetic diagnosis was a viable option. They also felt more relief; "those using the technology were actually motivated to not repeat pregnancy loss". In summary, although some of these studies are limited due to their retrospective nature and limited samples, the study's results indicate an overall satisfaction of participants for the use of PGD. However, the authors of the studies do indicate that these studies emphasize the need for future research such as creating a prospective design with a valid psychological scale necessary to assess the levels of stress and mood during embryonic transfer and implantation.

== Policy and legality ==
=== Canada ===
Prior to implementing the Assisted Human Reproduction Act (AHR) in 2004, PGD was unregulated in Canada. The Act banned sex selection for non-medical purposes.

Due to 2012's national budget cuts, the AHR was removed. The regulation of assisted reproduction was then delegated to each province. This delegation provides provinces with a lot of leeway to do as they please. As a result, provinces like Quebec, Alberta and Manitoba have put almost the full costs of IVF on the public healthcare bill. Dr. Santiago Munne, developer of the first PGD test for Down syndrome and founder of Reprogenetics, saw these provincial decisions as an opportunity for his company to grow and open more Reprogenetics labs around Canada. He dismissed all controversies regarding catalogue babies and states that he had no problem with perfect babies.

Ontario, however, has no concrete regulations regarding PGD. Since 2011, the Ministry of Children and Youth Services in Ontario advocates for the development government-funded 'safe fertility' education, embryo monitoring and assisted reproduction services for all Ontarians. This government report shows that Ontario not only has indefinite regulations regarding assisted reproduction services like IVF and PGD, but also does not fund any of these services. The reproductive clinics that exist are all private and located only in Brampton, Markham, Mississauga, Scarborough, Toronto, London and Ottawa. In contrast, provinces such as Alberta and Quebec not only have more clinics, but have also detailed laws regarding assisted reproduction and government funding for these practices.

=== Germany ===
Before 2010, the usage of PGD was in a legal grey area. In 2010, the Federal Court of Justice of Germany ruled that PGD can be used in exceptional cases. On 7 July 2011, the Bundestag passed a law that allows PGD in certain cases. The procedure may only be used when there is a strong likelihood that parents will pass on a genetic disease, or when there is a high genetic chance of a stillbirth or miscarriage. On 1 February 2013, the Bundesrat approved a rule regulating how PGD can be used in practice.

=== Hungary ===
In Hungary, PGD is allowed in case of severe hereditary diseases (when genetic risk is above 10%). The preimplantation genetic diagnosis for aneuploidy (PGS/PGD-A) is an accepted method as well. It is currently recommended in case of multiple miscarriages, and/or several failed IVF treatments, and/or when the mother is older than 35 years. Despite being an approved method, PGD-A is available at only one Fertility Clinic in Hungary.

=== India ===
In India, Ministry of Family Health and Welfare, regulates the concept under the Pre-Conception and Pre-Natal Diagnostic Techniques Act, 1994. The Act was further been revised after 1994 and necessary amendment were made are updated timely on the official website of the Indian Government dedicated for the cause. The use of PGD for sex identification/selection of child is illegal in India.

=== Mexico ===
As of 2006, clinics in Mexico legally provided PGD services.

=== South Africa ===
In South Africa, where the right to reproductive freedom is a constitutionally protected right, it has been proposed that the state can only limit PGD to the degree that parental choice can harm the prospective child or to the degree that parental choice will reinforce societal prejudice.

=== Ukraine ===
The preimplantation genetic diagnosis is allowed in Ukraine and from November 1, 2013, is regulated by the order of the Ministry of health of Ukraine "On approval of the application of assisted reproductive technologies in Ukraine" from 09.09.2013 No. 787.

=== United Kingdom ===
In the UK, assisted reproductive technologies are regulated under the Human Fertilization and Embryology Act (HFE) of 2008. However, the HFE Act does not address issues surrounding PGD. Thus, the HFE Authority (HFEA) was created in 2003 to act as a national regulatory agency that issues licenses and monitors clinics providing PGD. The HFEA only permits the use of PGD where the clinic concerned has a license from the HFEA and sets out the rules for this licensing in its Code of Practice. Each clinic, and each medical condition, requires a separate application where the HFEA check the suitability of the genetic test proposed and the staff skills and facilities of the clinic. Only then can PGD be used for a patient.

The HFEA strictly prohibits sex selection for social or cultural reasons, but allows it to avoid sex-linked disorders. They state that PGD is not acceptable for, "social or psychological characteristics, normal physical variations, or any other conditions which are not associated with disability or a serious medical condition." It is however accessible to couples or individuals with a known family history of serious genetic diseases. Nevertheless, the HFEA regards intersex variations as a "serious genetic disease", such as 5-alpha-reductase deficiency, a trait associated with some elite women athletes. Intersex advocates argue that such decisions are based on social norms of sex gender, and cultural reasons.

=== United States ===
No uniform system for regulation of assisted reproductive technologies, including genetic testing, exists in the United States. The practice and regulation of PGD most often fall under state laws or professional guidelines as the federal government does not have direct jurisdiction over the practice of medicine. To date, no state has implemented laws directly pertaining to PGD, therefore leaving researchers and clinicians to abide by guidelines set by the professional associations. The Centers for Disease Control and Prevention (CDC) states that all clinics providing IVF must report pregnancy success rates annually to the federal government, but reporting of PGD use and outcomes is not required. Professional organizations, such as the American Society for Reproductive Medicine (ASRM), have provided limited guidance on the ethical uses of PGD. The American Society for Reproductive Medicine (ASRM) states that "PGD should be regarded as an established technique with specific and expanding applications for standard clinical practice." They also state, "While the use of PGD for the purpose of preventing sex-linked diseases is ethical, the use of PGD solely for sex selection is discouraged."

In 2024, the Alabama Supreme Court ruled in an influential case that frozen embryos in test tubes should be considered children, thus raising complex legal questions with implications for reproductive care extending far beyond Alabama.

=== Spain ===
In Spain, preimplantation genetic diagnosis is not allowed to be carried out in an open and accessible way for everyone to avoid eugenics. That is why it is only legalized in high-risk cases.

There are three essential requirements (except for the exceptions allowed by the Bioethics Committees) for a preimplantation genetic diagnosis to be carried out on the embryo. All three must be met:

- That the embryo may contain an early-onset disease. If it were a late-onset disease, such as Alzheimer's, it could not be prevented by preimplantation diagnosis.
- That the disease to be detected is not currently curable. If it were a serious but curable disease, it could not be prevented by this method. An example of a pathology with no current cure on which preimplantation diagnosis could be applied would be Retinoblastoma, which is an autosomal recessive monogenic disease.
- That the disease is life-threatening or seriously affects the mental or psychomotor development of the child.

Any type of disease that does not meet these three requirements must go through a Bioethics Committee and be approved by it before PGD can be performed.

Legislation began late, ten years after the birth in the United Kingdom of Louise Brown, the first person conceived by IVF.

== References in popular culture ==
- PGD features prominently in the 1997 film Gattaca. The movie is set in a near-future world where PGD/IVF is the most common form of reproduction. In the movie parents routinely use PGD to select desirable traits for their children such as height, eye color, and freedom from even the smallest of genetic predispositions to disease. The ethical consequences of PGD are explored through the story of the main character who faces discrimination because he was conceived without such methods.
- PGD is mentioned in the 2004 novel My Sister's Keeper by the characters as the main character, Anna Fitzgerald, was created through PGD to be a genetic match for her APL positive sister Kate so that she could donate bone marrow at her birth to help Kate fight the APL. It is also mentioned in the book that her parents received criticism for the act.

== Information on clinic websites ==
In a study of 135 IVF clinics, 88% had websites, 70% mentioned PGD and 27% of the latter were university- or hospital-based and 63% were private clinics. Sites mentioning PGD also mentioned uses and benefits of PGD far more than the associated risks. Of the sites mentioning PGD, 76% described testing for single-gene diseases, but only 35% mentioned risks of missing target diagnoses, and only 18% mentioned risks for loss of the embryo. 14% described PGD as new or controversial. Private clinics were more likely than other programs to list certain PGD risks like for example diagnostic error, or note that PGD was new or controversial, reference sources of PGD information, provide accuracy rates of genetic testing of embryos, and offer gender selection for social reasons.

== See also ==
- Bioethics
- Designer baby
- Family-based QTL mapping
- Polygenic score
- Sperm sorting
