= Donor registration =

Systems to aid later offspring–gamete-donor contact

Donor registration facilitates donor conceived people, sperm donors and egg donors to establish contact with genetic kindred. Registries are mostly used by donor conceived people to find out their genetic heritage and to find half-siblings from the same egg or sperm donor. In some jurisdictions donor registration is compulsory, while in others it is voluntary; but most jurisdictions do not have any registration system.

== Types of registries ==
There are registries of the fertility clinics etc. as well as independent registries.

=== Clinic registries ===
Fertility clinics etc. keep registries of donors and receivers. The donor number is generally available to the donor as well as the receivers. On the other hand, a donor doesn't generally know which receivers that are linked to his/her donor number, and the receivers don't generally know the true identity behind the donor number.

In the case of non-anonymous donors, the donor conceived people may know the true identity of the donor behind the donor number.

=== Independent registries ===
Since clinic registries are often very limited, independent registries may be more efficient in finding genetic kindred.

Some donors are non-anonymous, but most are anonymous, i.e. the donor conceived person doesn't know the true identity of the donor. Still, he/she may get the donor number from the fertility clinic. If that donor had donated before, then other donor conceived people with the same donor number are thus genetic half-siblings. In short, donor registries matches people who type in the same donor number.

Alternatively, if the donor number isn't available, then known donor characteristics, e.g. hair, eye and skin color may be used in matching siblings.

Donors may also register, and therefore, donor registries may also match donors with their genetic children.

=== Private registries ===
Sperm banks keep their own records of sperm donors and recipients, although there may not be any obligation to save them unless there is non-anonymous sperm donation, let alone any obligation to reveal them for donor conceived people who want to know about their genetic history.

In the US there is increased pressure on sperm banks to make donor information available to donor conceived people, for example by creating a collaborative private registry between sperm banks. Without such initiative, it may lead to a government driven registry that sperm banks and clinics must report to.

== International registration standards ==
Some countries have established laws concerning the registration of donors, others permit states to regulate this or have no regulation.

=== Australia ===
In Australia, health issues are the responsibility of the states and territories. In Victoria, donor registers are maintained by the Victorian Assisted Reproductive Treatment Authority (VARTA) (until 2010 called the Infertility Treatment Authority). Donor registration is compulsory and donors agree to release identifying information to the donor child when they reach 18 years of age. Some other states, such as Western Australia, have a voluntary register on which donors and recipients may register their details.

=== New Zealand ===
In New Zealand the Human Assisted Reproductive Technology Act 2004 established compulsory registration of donors and their offspring born from donations made after 22 August 2005. Fertility clinics must inform the Registrar of Births Deaths and Marriages that a donor offspring has been born, and give the Registrar identifying details about the donor, offspring and clinic. Non-identifying details about the donor must be retained by the fertility clinic for 50 years or until the clinic closes, when they are transferred to the Registrar.

Information from clinics and the Registrar may be released to donors, donor offspring and their parents, and medical professionals. However, there are restrictions on releasing identifying details about donor offspring until they turn 18 years old (16 years old with permission of the Family Court).

The Registrar of Births Deaths and Marriages maintains a second voluntary register detailing donor and donor offspring arising from donations prior to 22 August 2015.

=== Sweden ===
As in Austria, donor registration is a task for each region, in Sweden: county. Thus, any official fertility clinic cannot know if a donor has donated in other places within the country as well.

The Personal Data Act regulates donor/sibling registries in Sweden. For instance, personal data may mostly not be handed out unless there is consent from that person, and this might include donor codes, although only the clinic itself can link it directly with that donor. However, they may still indirectly link to the donor, and therefore, it is not certain that clinics are willing to deliver donor codes. Furthermore, even if the organization is availed the data, then, by the same law, such an organization has huge responsibilities. For instance:

- It has to make sure the data only is used for its purpose, i.e. link donor siblings to each other.
- The people turning to the organization too has to give data to the organization, and therefore have to be properly informed about how it is used. In addition, a written consent has to be retrieved from them.

=== United Kingdom ===
In the United Kingdom, the Human Fertilisation and Embryology Authority (HFEA) has a central register of people conceived using gamete donation after 1 August 1991. People conceived using donations made after 1 April 2005 will have the right to know who their donor was when they turn 18. UK Donorlink was a Department of Health Funded voluntary register for people conceived before 1 August 1991 and for their donors.

== See also ==
- Donor Sibling Registry
- Donor conceived people
- Dibling
- sperm donors
- egg donors
- artificial insemination
- donor insemination
- sperm bank
- accidental incest
