= Serodiscordant =

Mixed status, where one partner is infected by HIV and the other is not

A serodiscordant relationship, also known as mixed-status, is one where one partner is infected by HIV and the other is not. This contrasts with seroconcordant relationships, in which both partners are of the same HIV status. Without effective prevention measures, serodiscordant relationships can significantly contribute to the spread of HIV/AIDS, with the risk varying based on the type and frequency of sexual activity and the viral load of the HIV-positive partner.

Globally, an estimated 34 million people are living with HIV, with 68% residing in sub-Saharan Africa nations such as Lesotho and 50% of cases affecting women. In the United States, over 140,000 HIV-serodiscordant heterosexual couples are estimated, with 52% of HIV-positive women in a national study reporting serodiscordant partnerships. Similarly, in sub-Saharan Africa, 47% of HIV-positive women are in stable serodiscordant relationships. The World Health Organization reports that up to 50% of individuals living with HIV in ongoing relationships worldwide have partners who are HIV-negative.

Serodiscordant couples face numerous issues not faced by seroconcordant couples, including decisions as to what level of sexual activity is comfortable for them, knowing that practicing safer sex reduces but does not eliminate the risk of transmission to the HIV-negative partner. There are also potential psychological issues arising out of taking care of a sick partner, and survivor guilt. Psychological impacts included anger, fear, grief, and loss of control, often exacerbated by the secrecy surrounding their partner's status. Financial strains may also be more accentuated as one partner becomes ill and potentially less able or unable to work.

Research involving serodiscordant couples has offered insights into how the virus is passed and how individuals who are HIV positive may be able to reduce the risk of passing the virus to their partner.

Experts predict that there are thousands of serodiscordant couples in the US who wish to have children. The Special Program of Assisted Reproduction was developed in 1996 to help serodiscordant couples conceive safely, however, it is solely designed to help couples where the male partner is infected.

The WHO's consolidated guideline on sexual and reproductive health and rights for women living with HIV provides strategies to minimize HIV transmission risks in serodiscordant relationships when planning pregnancy. Key recommendations include antiretroviral therapy (ART) to suppress the viral load in the HIV-positive partner, pre-exposure prophylaxis (PrEP) for the HIV-negative partner, timing unprotected intercourse during peak fertility, screening and treating sexually transmitted infections in both partners, voluntary medical male circumcision for HIV-negative men, and assisted reproductive techniques such as artificial insemination.

== See also ==
- Undetectable = Untransmittable
- HIV testing
- HIV/AIDS
- HIV/AIDS in Lesotho
- Serology
- Serosorting
- Serostatus
- Sperm washing
- Safe sex
