= Uniform Anatomical Gift Act =

United States law governing some organ donations

The Uniform Anatomical Gift Act (UAGA), and its periodic revisions, is one of the uniform acts drafted by the National Conference of Commissioners on Uniform State Laws (NCCUSL), also known as the Uniform Law Commission (ULC), in the United States with the intention of harmonizing state laws between the states.

The UAGA governs organ donations for the purpose of transplantation. The Act permits any adult to become an organ donor. It also governs the making of anatomical gifts of one's cadaver to be dissected in the study of medicine. The law prescribes the forms by which such gifts can be made. It also provides that in the absence of such a document, a surviving spouse, or if there is no spouse, a list of specific relatives in order of preference, can make the gift. It also seeks to limit the liability of health care providers who act on good faith representations that a deceased patient meant to make an anatomical gift. The Act also prohibits trafficking and trafficking in human organs for profit from donations for transplant or therapy.

The UAGA provides a template for the legislation to adjust public policy and align it with developments in medical practice. Some states have their own version of the UAGA which is an updated version of the Uniform laws already enacted throughout the United States.

== History ==
There were three versions of the Uniform Anatomical Gift Act that were enacted; the first was the UAGA of 1968, which was followed up with revisions in 1987. The most recent version was created in 2006. The Uniform Anatomical Gift Act has been established in some form, in every state and the District of Columbia (D.C.), as of 2017.

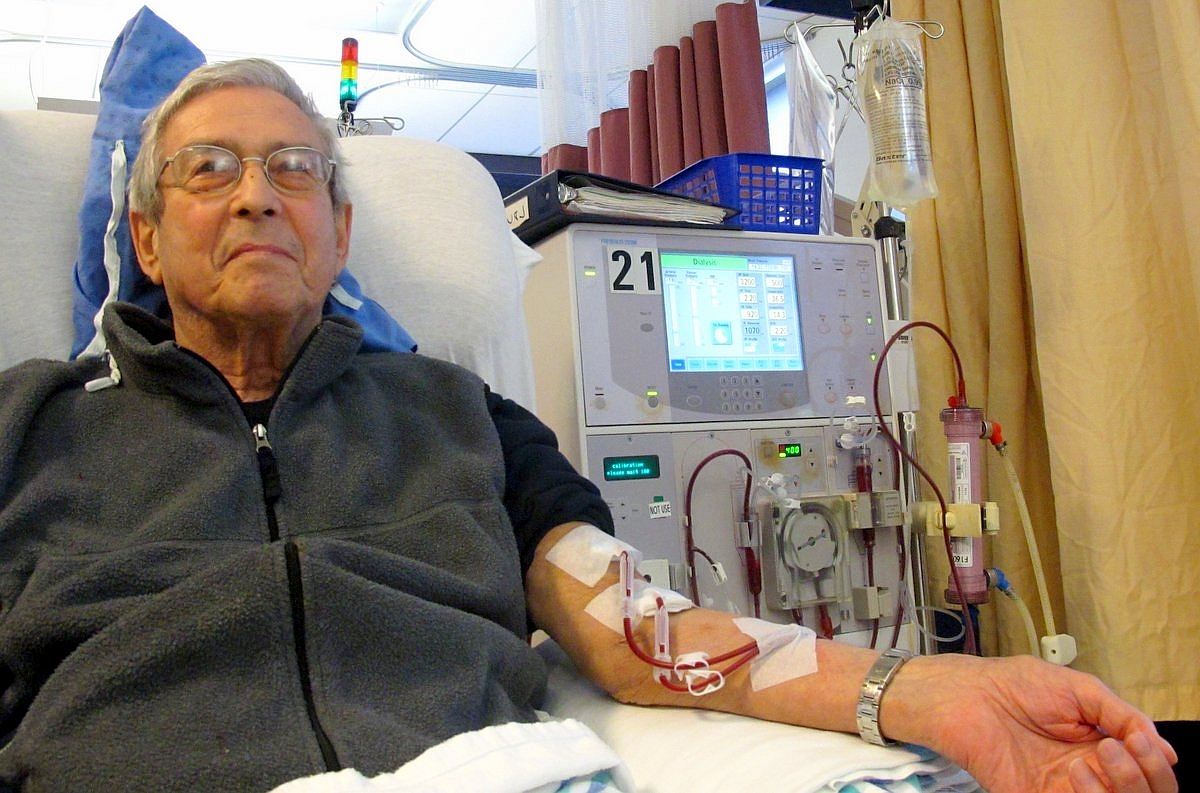
Patient receiving dialysis; without an organ donation in the form of a kidney transplant, dialysis must be performed three times a week for life.

The law has been revised to make the process of making an anatomical gift more streamlined, "in light of changes in federal law and regulation and related developments in the field of organ donation, thereby facilitating the availability of organs for transplantation." The demand for donated organs is extremely high due to the fact that a large number of people die while waiting for an organ transplant in the United States. As of 2016, there were fewer registered organ donors than people in need of an organ or tissue transplant.

Formerly, anatomical gifts had to be executed with testamentary formalities, including the creation of a written document with two witnesses; the latest version of the statute eliminates the requirement of the witnesses. Medical examiners and medical professionals who cared for a patient upon their death were previously permitted to remove a part of a body if there was no known next of kin, or if the body was unidentified. This change is to encourage the practice of allowing an anatomical gift to be made by a notation on a driver's license.

=== The Uniform Anatomical Gift Act of 1968 ===
The first Uniform Anatomical Gift Act was created after the first successful heart transplant in 1967; the operation was performed by Dr. Christiaan Barnard. In 1968, Congress approved the UAGA and recommended that all states adopt it. The Act was the first legislation enacted by all states in United States to address the donation of organs, tissues, and eyes as gifts to someone who may be in need of an organ for survival. The UAGA was drafted in order to increase organ and blood supplies and donation and to protect patients in the United States. It replaced numerous state laws concerning transplantation and laws lacking a uniform procedure of organ donation and an inadequate process of becoming a donor.

All states adopted the original version of the law.

=== The Uniform Anatomical Gift Act of 1987 ===
In 1987, the Uniform Anatomical Gift Act of 1968 was revised so that there was a uniform manner of obtaining consent from individuals. At this time, every state enacted at least some part of the UAGA. The provisions of the UAGA of 1968 would ban the purchase and sale of body parts, facilitate the simplified process of obtaining authorization to retrieve organs, and ensure that medical staff establish procedures and guidelines to identify organ donors while under hospital care. The Act also characterized a body part or organ as property because of the ability of a living individual to gift parts of their body to another individual. Another major statement that this revised version of the UAGA made was that a coroner's investigation or an autopsy could not be obstructed by an individual's wish for organ donation. The 1987 UAGA regulated organs for the purposes of transplantation or therapy. In addition, the individual's wishes to donate were prioritized over the family's or next of kin's wishes. Hospitals were authorized to retrieve organs if an individual was found to have documentation of consenting.

The Act's revisions were enacted by 26 states: Alabama, Arizona, Arkansas, California, Hawaii, Idaho, Indiana, Iowa, Minnesota, Montana, Nevada, New Hampshire, New Mexico, North Dakota, Oregon, Rhode Island, the U.S. Virgin Islands, Utah, Virginia, Washington, and Wisconsin.

=== The Uniform Anatomical Gift Act of 2006 ===
==== Summary ====
In 2006, The Uniform Anatomical Gift Act was revised with three main goals: motivating more of the population to make anatomical gifts, making honoring an individual's wishes to donate a priority, and maintaining the current organ donation and transplantation system in the United States. It also has the purpose of setting rules and guidelines for determining the purposes that one had for choosing to make a gift as well as the purpose of the gift of an organ, eye, or tissue itself. The UAGA was revised to accommodate the developments in medicine and science regarding organ donation and transplantation, as well as the regulations of donation and transplantation with the goal of increasing the supply of gifted organs. The Uniform Anatomical Gift Act of 2006 was revised to make the laws governing anatomical gifts more uniform between states that had enacted and continued to enforce the UAGA of 1968 and ones that had enacted the revised UAGA of 1987, leading to more consistency.

==== Revisions ====
The UAGA of 2006 allows for individuals to consent to organ donation by expressing their wish when obtaining a driver's license, through verbal expression, by writing it in a will or other advance directive, or in any other manner, simplifying the consent process. This is also known as "opting in" to organ donation. In some states, one may register to become an organ donor online on a state's Donor Registry website, and an individual is permitted to choose which organs they wish to donate by checking boxes. An important addition to the UAGA of 2006 was the strengthening of certain language regarding one's right to make a decision for themselves pertaining to consent of organ donation, making it harder for others to try to nullify one's wish to consent after their death. The only exception allowing an individual's consent to donate to be overridden is in the case of the death of a minor when parents or guardians may override the minor's consent. Language in the Act is also made more clear so that one cannot revoke an anatomical gift as the donor's decision is final. This revised UAGA additionally created legislation allowing certain people to make an anatomical gift to another person while the donating individual is still alive. It is stated that it's the duty of law enforcement officers, firefighters, paramedics, and other emergency personnel to search for the records of donor consent upon death. Another significant addition to the Uniform Anatomical Gift Act of 2006 is the rule of making transplantation or therapy prioritized over research or education with an anatomical gift when a donor's wishes are unclearly stated in documentation.

The Uniform Anatomical Gift Act of 2006 clarifies words written in the law that formerly were ambiguous and confusing such as: anatomical gift, record, refusal, guardian, prospective donor, reasonably available, and disinterested witness.

The UAGA revision of 2006 makes it a felony punishable by a fine or prison to falsify, deface, or destroy organ donor documentation of another.

Many states have drafted and enacted their own updated versions of the UAGA based on the revisions of 2006.

=== Legislation status of UAGA in the U.S. ===
In the United States, all states have enacted some version of the UAGA. States have the authority to use the Uniform Anatomical Gift Acts as a template to put additional revisions into law depending on what best fits the state's needs.

Uniform Anatomical Gift Act (UAGA) Legislation of U.S. States and Territories
U.S. State or Territory	UAGA Legislation Version	State Law Location	Legal Citation
Alabama	2006	Title 22, Chapter 19, Article 9, Alabama Code	Ala. Code § 22-19-160 to § 22-19-174
Alaska	2006	Title 13, Chapter 52, Article 4, Alaska Statutes	Alaska Stat. §§ 13.52.170-13.52.280
Arizona	2006	Title 36, Chapter 7, Article 3, Arizona Revised Statutes	Ariz. Rev. Stat. §§ 36-841-36-844
Arkansas	2006	Title 20, Subtitle 2, Chapter 17, Subchapter 12, Arkansas Code	Ark. Code Ann. §§ 20-17-1201 to 20-17-1218
California	2006	California Health and Safety Code, Chapter 3.5	Cal. Health & Saf. Code §§ 7150-7156.5
Colorado	2006	Title 15, Article 19, Part 2, Colorado Revised Statutes	Colo. Rev. Stat. §§ 15-19-201 to 15-19-223
Connecticut	2010	Title 19a, Chapter 368i, Connecticut General Statutes	Conn. Gen. Stat. §§ 19a-289 to 19a-289v
Delaware	2015	Title 16, Chapter 27, Subchapter II, Delaware Code	Del. Code tit. 16 § 2710-2731
District of Columbia (D.C.)	1968	Title 7, Subchapter II-A, D.C. Code	D.C. Code § 7-1531.01 to § 7-1531.22
Florida	2008	Chapter 765, Part V, Florida Statutes	FS. §§ 765.510-765.547
Georgia	2006	Title 44, Chapter 5, Article 6, Georgia Code Annotated	Ga. Code Ann. §§ 44-5-143 to 44-5-153
Hawaii	2006	Title 19, Chapter 327, Part I, Hawaii Revised Statutes	HRS §§ 327-3 to 327-11
Idaho	2006	Title 39, Chapter 34, Subchapter 34, Idaho Code	Idaho Code §§ 39-3401 to 39-3420
Illinois	2006	755 Illinois Compiled Statutes 50/Article 5	755 ILCS 50/5-5 and 755 ILCS 50/5-20
Indiana	2006	Title 29, Article 2, Chapter 16.1, Indiana Code	Ind. Code § 29-2-16.1-1 to § 29-2-16.1-14
Iowa	2006	Chapter 142C, Iowa Code	Iowa Code § 142C.1 to § 142C.15
Kansas	2006	Article 32, Kansas Statutes	Kan. Stat. art. 32
Kentucky	2006	Title 26, Chapter 311, Kentucky Revised Statutes	Ky. Rev. Stat. §§ 311.1915-311.1931
Louisiana	2006	Title 17, Chapter 23, Part III, Louisiana Revised Statutes	La. Rev. Stat. Ann. §§ 17:2351-17:2359
Maine	2006	Title 22, Chapter 710-B, Maine Revised Statutes	Me. Rev. Stat. tit. 22 § 2941 et seq.
Maryland	2012	Title 4, Subtitle 5, Maryland Code	Md. Code, Estates & Trusts § 4-501 to § 4-522
Massachusetts	2006	Chapter 113A, Massachusetts General Laws	M.G.L. c. 113A §§ 1-13
Michigan	2008	Public Health Code, Article 10, Part 101, Michigan Compiled Laws	MCL 333.10101 - 333.10123
Minnesota	2006	Chapter 525A, Minnesota Statutes	Minn. Stat. § 525A.01 to 525A.21
Mississippi	2006	Title 41, Chapter 39, Mississippi Code	Miss. Code Ann. §§ 41-39-101 to 41-39-149
Missouri	2006	Chapter 194, Missouri Revised Statutes	Mo. Rev. Stat. §§ 194.210-194.290
Montana	2006	Title 72, Chapter 17, Montana Code Annotated	Mont. Code Ann. §§ 72-17-201 to 72-17-214
Nebraska	2006	Chapter 71, Article 48, Nebraska Revised Statutes	Neb. Rev. Stat. §§ 71-4834-71-4842
Nevada	2006	Chapter 451, Subchapter 5, Nevada Revised Statutes	NRS §§ 451.500-451.571
New Hampshire	2006	Title 26, Chapter 291-A, New Hampshire Revised Statutes Annotated	RSA 291-A:1-291-A:23
New Jersey	2006	Title 26, Chapter 6, New Jersey Revised Statutes	N.J. Stat. Ann. § 26:6-77 et seq.
New Mexico	2006	Chapter 24, Article 6B, New Mexico Statutes Annotated	N.M. Stat. Ann. §§ 24-6B-1 to 24-6B-23
New York	1987	Article 43, Public Health Law, New York	N.Y. Pub. Health Law § 4300 et seq.
North Carolina	2006	Chapter 130A, Article 16, Part 3A, North Carolina General Statutes	N.C. Gen. Stat. §§ 130A-412.4 to 130A-412.31
North Dakota	2006	Chapter 23-06.6, North Dakota Century Code	N.D.C.C. §§ 23-06.6-01 to 23-06.6-14
Ohio	2006	Chapter 2108, Human Bodies Or Parts Thereof, Ohio Revised Code	Ohio Rev. Code §§ 2108.02-2108.35
Oklahoma	2006	Title 63, Chapter 46, Article 3, Oklahoma Statutes	Okla. Stat. tit. 63 § 2200.1A - § 2200.18A
Oregon	2013	Chapter 97, Article 9, Oregon Revised Statutes	Or. Rev. Stat. §§ 97.955-97.980
Pennsylvania	1987	Title 20, Chapter 86, Pennsylvania Consolidated Statutes	Pa. Cons. Stat. §§ 8611-
Puerto Rico	2006	Title 24, Chapter 150 of the Laws of Puerto Rico	24 L.P.R.A. §§ 3620d-3620y
Rhode Island	2006	Chapter 23-18.6.1, Rhode Island	R.I. Gen. Laws § 23-18.6.1-9
South Carolina	2006	Title 44, Chapter 43, Article 14, South Carolina Code Ann.	S.C. Code Ann. §§ 44-43-310 & 44-43-320 & 44-43-345
South Dakota	2006	Title 34, Chapter 26, Article 6, South Dakota Codified Laws	S.D. Codified Laws §§ 34-26-51 to 34-26-59
Tennessee	2006	Title 68, Chapter 30, Part 1, Tennessee Code Annotated	Tenn. Code Ann. §§ 68-30-101 to 68-30-132
Texas	2006	Texas Health and Safety Code, Chapter 692A	Tex. Health & Saf. Code §§ 692A.001 - 692A.023
U.S. Virgin Islands	2006	Title 19, Chapter 20, US Virgin Islands Code	V.I. Code tit. 19, § 409
Utah	2006	Title 26b, Chapter 8, Part 3, Utah Code Annotated	Utah Code Ann. §§ 26B-8-301 to 26B-8-320
Vermont	2006	Title 18, Chapter 110, Vermont Statutes Annotated	Vt. Stat. Ann. §§ 5250d-5250k
Virginia	2006	Title 32.1, Chapter 8, Article 2, Virginia Code	Va. Code §§ 32.1-291.1 to 32.1-291.23
Washington	2006	Chapter 68.64, Revised Code of Washington	RCW §§ 68.64
West Virginia	2008	Title 16, Article 19, West Virginia Code	W. Va. Code §§ 16-19-11 to 16-19-33
Wisconsin	2006	Chapter 157, Wisconsin Statutes	Wis. Stat. § 157.06
Wyoming	2006	Title 35, Chapter 5, Article 2, Wyoming Statutes Annotated	Wyo. Stat. Ann. §§ 35-5-201 to 35-5-223

== Ethical concerns ==
The UAGA does not specify regulations for organ donation by a prisoner or prohibit an inmate from donating their body or an organ. Christian Longo, a convicted murderer, has played a key role in rousing public debate regarding the rights of the incarcerated to become organ donors.

The retrieval of gametes from the deceased have been the subject of controversy because of the highly publicized court case In re Matter of Daniel Thomas Christy in Iowa, regarding the right to retrieve reproductive cells (posthumous sperm retrieval) from a deceased spouse or partner. The argument against the retrieval of post mortem gametes in this case was that the UAGA stated the purposes of donation were for transplantation, therapy, research, or education.

Since the Uniform Anatomical Gift Act was put into effect in all states, there still has been a donor shortage in the United States.

== Case law ==
- Werling v. Sandy (Ohio 1985)

== See also ==
- Anatomical gifts
- List of Uniform Acts (United States)
- Organ donation
- Transplantation
- Gift of Life
- National Organ Transplant Act (NOTA) of 1984
