= Ova bank =

Facility which allocates human egg cells

An ova bank, or cryobank, or egg cell bank, similar to a sperm bank, is a facility that collects and stores human ova, mainly from ova donors, primarily for the purpose of achieving pregnancies of either the donor, at a later time (i.e. to overcome issues of infertility), or through third party reproduction, notably by artificial insemination. Ova donated in this way are known as donor ova.

== General ==
There are currently very few ova banks in existence.

Generally, the main purpose of storing ova, at present, is to overcome infertility which may arise at a later age, or due to a disease. The ova are generally collected between 31 and 35 years of age.

The procedure of collecting ova may or may not include ovarian hyperstimulation.

It can be expected however that ova collection will become more important in the future, i.e. for third party reproduction, and/or for producing stem cells, i.e. from unfertilized eggs (oocytes).

== See also ==
- Sperm bank
- Gene bank
- Artificial insemination
- Genetic counseling
- Genetic testing
- New eugenics
- Safe upper age limit for women donating ova
- Eugenics
- Infertility
- Surrogacy
- Commercial surrogacy
- Assisted reproduction
- Designer babies
