= Sperm washing =

Separation of individual sperm from semen

Sperm washing is the process in which individual sperm are separated from the semen. Washed sperm is used in artificial insemination using the intrauterine insemination (IUI) technique and in in vitro fertilization (IVF). It may also be used to decrease the risk of HIV transmission by an HIV-positive male, in which case the washed sperm is injected into a female using an artificial insemination technique.

Sperm washing involves removing any mucus and non-motile sperm in the semen to improve the chances of fertilization and to extract certain disease-carrying material in the semen. Sperm washing is a standard procedure in infertility treatment.

Once the fastest sperm have been isolated, before using them for artificial insemination or in vitro fertilization, it is important to confirm the absence of HIV virus in the sample.

The sample obtained after washing is analysed, usually using the PCR technique, to check that there are no viral particles. If the result is negative, i.e. there is no virus, the sample is suitable for use in assisted reproduction treatments. Washed samples are usually free of the virus.

== Procedure ==
Sperm washing takes place in a laboratory following sperm donation.

Sperm may be washed by density gradient centrifugation or by a "direct swim-up" technique that does not involve centrifugation. In normal semen samples, centrifugation causes no more DNA damage to spermatozoa than a direct swim-up technique.

Washed sperm is concentrated in Ham's F-10 media without L-glutamine, warmed to 37 °C (99 °F). A chemical known as a cryoprotectant is added to the sperm to aid the freezing and thawing process. Further chemicals may be added which separate the most active sperm in the sample, as well as extend or dilute the sample so that vials for a number of inseminations are produced.

== Decreased HIV transmission ==
Sperm washing can be used to decrease the risk of HIV transmission in HIV-positive males, because the infection is carried by the seminal fluid rather than the sperm. One Italian study from 2005 of 567 serodiscordant couples treated with washed sperm resulted in no horizontal (to the woman) or vertical (to the child) HIV seroconversion. However, there is no 100% guarantee that washed sperm is free from the virus.

== History ==
Sperm washing was first used in Milan, Italy. The oldest child conceived using this method was born in 1997 and is HIV negative. The first known baby conceived this way in the United States, Baby Ryan, was born in 1999 through the Special Program of Assisted Reproduction started by Ann Kiessling.

Starting in the mid-1990s the technique was used to help HIV discordant couples conceive without passing the virus from the father to the mother or child. The idea is that when the male is HIV positive, the technique will reduce the risk of transmission to the female. For years there were lingering doubts about the safety of the procedure, and many couples had to travel to places that would do the procedure, such as Italy. Today, hundreds of babies have been born through this process.
