= Special Program of Assisted Reproduction =

The Special Program of Assisted Reproduction (SPAR) is a program offered to HIV discordant couples (serodiscordant) at the Bedford Research Foundation's clinical laboratory. The program takes advantage of ART (assisted reproduction technology) procedures (including "sperm washing") to assist couples achieve a pregnancy who would otherwise risk transmitting the father's HIV infection to the mother and the child through intercourse.

SPAR employs extremely stringent safety standards; samples will only be submitted for "sperm washing" and cryopreservation that have first been screened for HIV virus particles and infected cells by specialized molecular biology tests. Only samples that have been determined to have an undetectable HIV viral burden will be submitted for infertility procedures.

Assisted reproductive technologies (ART), such as in vitro fertilization (IVF), treat many disorders of the female, but until recent years, treatment options for male factor infertility were limited, and donor sperm was routinely recommended to achieve a pregnancy. Advances in ART, however, have created new possibilities for men with male factor infertility, including those whose sperm counts have been decreased by cancer treatment and other diseases, and men with incurable, sexually transmissible virus diseases.

Infectious diseases transmissible by semen for which there is no cure include:

- Hepatitis B
- Human T Cell Leukemia Virus (HTLV-1)
- Human Immunodeficiency Virus (HIV)

== History ==
SPAR began in 1994 at the New England Deaconess Hospital (now Beth Israel Deaconess Medical Center) as a support group for couples wishing to parent when one of them had an incurable sexually transmitted disease. The patient couples began raising money to fund the research needed to develop the methods to improve the safety of attempting pregnancy. By 1996 sufficient funds were available to begin, but a merger between the Beth Israel Hospital and the New England Deaconess Hospital (now Beth Israel Deaconess Medical Center) necessitated the creation of an independent Massachusetts public charity, the Assisted Reproduction Foundation (now the Bedford Stem Cell Research Foundation directed by Dr. Ann Kiessling), to continue the work. Within two years, the methods for reducing, and perhaps eliminating, the risks of infection to the mother and the child were developed and Baby Ryan was born in 1999.

The goal of SPAR was to provide semen testing by experts that would ensure improved safety of sperm that could then be shipped to infertility clinics near the couple's home. In this way, couples could be cared for in the same manner as other couples in their community. Fortunately, a few clinics were willing to help with this effort, and by 2002, seven collaborating clinics around the country were caring for couples living with HIV disease.

In the Spring of 2000 a ground breaking study was completed, giving significant insight to the role of semen producing organs in HIV anti-viral therapy.
