= Bedford Research Foundation =

Bedford Research Foundation Logo

Bedford Research Foundation is a non-profit Institute that conducts stem cell research for diseases and conditions that currently have no known cure. The institute also created the Special Program of Assisted Reproduction (SPAR), a program that assists serodiscordant couples successfully achieve pregnancy. Dr. Ann Kiessling, the founder of Bedford Stem Cell Research Foundation, is the Laboratory Director.

== Background ==
Bedford Research Foundation was founded to satisfy the need for a research and development clinical laboratory that could facilitate technology transfer from basic science discoveries to clinical test applications. BRF was founded and incorporated in 1996 by Dr. Ann Kiessling and through the efforts of men and women whose lives were altered by blood products tainted with the AIDS virus (Human Immunodeficiency Virus, HIV) and Hepatitis C virus. Faced with unprecedented disease obstacles, the men and women insisted that biomedical technology be developed to fight their infections, and allow them to conceive children of their own. Research to ensure the safety of conception by assisted reproductive technologies in general was not funded by the National Institutes of Health because of the U.S. Congress decisions in 1996 and 1998 that research on fertilized human eggs "...is meritorious and should be done for society..., but will not be funded by taxpayer dollars."

The Foundation conducts research within its own laboratories (Stem Cell, Prostate, Infectious disease) as well as in collaboration with other laboratories and raises money to award research grants to qualified investigators seeking to improve the safety and success of assisted reproduction to mothers and babies. Much of the research supported by the Foundation cannot be funded by federal grants-in-aid because of the U.S. moratorium on funding research on human eggs activated either artificially or by sperm.

For this reason, the men and women themselves raised the money to fund the Special Program of Assisted Reproduction (SPAR). Within two years, technology was developed to protect against virus transmission at conception. As a result, Baby Ryan was born in 1999 to a healthy Mom and a Dad with hemophilia who was infected with Hepatitis C and HIV by tainted blood factors.

In conjunction with stem cell research, Foundation scientists also apply patented processes to help diagnose male reproductive tract disorders. Research done at the Foundation has led to the development of additional tests that may provide valuable information about overall men's health. A current focus is detection of bacteria in semen by molecular biology methods instead of standard laboratory culture. Studies to date reveal that semen contains bacteria not previously identified. Such studies hold the promise of developing new tests for the health of semen producing organs such as the prostate, which is a site of significant disease in men, including infection (prostatitis) and cancer.

== SARS2 (Coronavirus) Testing ==
On April 10, 2020 it was reported that Bedford Research Foundation had expanded its operations to include SARS2 testing, making it one of 66 sites in the United States with a Food and Drug Administration- approved test for COVID-19. The lab began testing samples from Sturdy Hospital in Attleboro and Emerson in Concord. On April 21, 2020, Bedford Research Foundation piloted a program to expand their SARS2 (Coronavirus) testing to the public. The test was well-received and successful. The foundation is currently making plans to expand the program.
