= Sperm sorting =

Way to sort sperm cells in fertilization

Sperm sorting is a means of choosing what type of sperm cell is to fertilize an egg cell using several conventional techniques of centrifugation or swim-up. Newly applied methods such as flow cytometry expand the possibilities of sperm sorting and new techniques of sperm sorting are being developed.

It can be used to sort out sperm that are most healthy, as well as for determination of more specific traits, such as sex selection in which spermatozoa are separated into X- (female) and Y- (male) chromosome bearing populations based on their difference in DNA content. The resultant 'sex-sorted' spermatozoa are then able to be used in conjunction with other assisted reproductive technologies such as artificial insemination or in-vitro fertilization (IVF) to produce offspring of the desired sex - in farming animals but also in human medical practice.

== Methods ==
=== Conventional techniques ===
Several methods have been used to sort sperm before the advent of flow cytometry. Density gradient centrifugation (in a continuous or discontinuous gradient) can concentrate semen samples with low concentration of sperm, using the density of sperm as a measure of their quality. Similarly, so-called swim-up techniques apply a centrifugation step and then sperm is allowed to swim up into a medium, thus enriching a subpopulation of motile sperm. However, use of sperm centrifugation is detrimental to the sperm viability and elicits production of reactive oxygen species. Conventional techniques are routinely used in assisted reproductive technology.

=== Flow cytometry ===
Flow cytometry is another method used to sort sperm and adaptations of this technique opens new opportunities in sperm sorting. However, because flow cytometry-based sperm sorting often uses fluorescent dyes that often stain DNA, the safety of this technique in human reproductive medicine is a matter of scientific discussion.

However, flow cytometry is the only currently used technique able to determine the sex of future progeny by measuring DNA content of individual sperm cells. It evaluates if they contain the larger X chromosome (giving rise to a female offspring) or smaller Y chromosome (leading to male progeny). It then allows separation of X and Y sperm. The so-called Beltsfield Sperm Sexing Technology was developed by USDA in conjunction with Lawrence Livermore National Laboratories, relying on the DNA difference between the X- and Y- chromosomes. Prior to flow cytometric sorting, semen is labeled with a fluorescent dye called Hoechst 33342 which binds to the DNA of each spermatozoon. As the X chromosome is larger (i.e. has more DNA) than the Y chromosome, the "female" (X-chromosome bearing) spermatozoa will absorb a greater amount of dye than its male (Y-chromosome bearing) counterpart. As a consequence, when exposed to UV light during flow cytometry, X spermatozoa fluoresce brighter than Y- spermatozoa. As the spermatozoa pass through the flow cytometer in single file, each spermatozoon is encased by a single droplet of fluid and assigned an electric charge corresponding to its chromosome status (e.g. X-positive charge, Y-negative charge). The stream of X- and Y- droplets is then separated by means of electrostatic deflection and collected into separate collection tubes for subsequent processing.

Another cytometric technique used in sperm sorting is magnetic-activated cell sorting (MACS) which is routinely applied in assisted reproduction hospitals to sort out sperm with fragmented DNA. This is achieved using antibodies to surface markers of programmed cell death (apoptosis) such as annexin V, coupled with magnetic beads. Following the binding of these antibodies, spermatozoa which undergo apoptosis are sorted by applying magnetic field to the sperm suspension. MACS obviates the need for fluorescent DNA binding molecules.

=== Other techniques ===
DNA damage in sperm cells may be detected by using Raman spectroscopy. It is not specific enough to detect individual traits, however. The sperm cells having least DNA damage may subsequently be injected into the egg cell by intracytoplasmic sperm injection (ICSI). Many other methods for sperm sorting have been proposed or are currently tested.

To select spermatozoa with low DNA damage index the population of sperm could be enriched with spermatozoa with non-fragmented DNA, with techniques like electrophoresis, Z method and MACS (Magnetic Activating Cell Sorting), which in combination with density gradient centrifugation in single sperm preparation protocols results in spermatozoa with superior quality.

Hyaluronic acid (HA) binding sites on the sperm plasma membrane are an indicator of sperm maturity (Huszar et al., 2003, Yudin et al., 1999). There are two methods based on this fact: physiological intracytoplasmic sperm injection (PICSI), and a sperm slow procedure; both methods require sperm preparation via sperm washing or centrifugation.

== Applications ==
Sperm undergoes a process of natural selection when millions of sperm enter the vagina but only few reach the egg cell and then only one is usually allowed to fertilize it. The sperm is selected not only by its highest motility but also by other factors such as DNA integrity, production of reactive oxygen species and viability. This selection is largely circumvented in case of in-vitro fertilization which leads to higher incidence of birth defects associated with assisted reproductive techniques. Egg cells are often fertilized by sperm which would have low chance of fertilizing it in natural conditions. Sperm sorting could thus be used to decrease risks associated with assisted reproduction. Additionally, there is ongoing debate about using sperm sorting for choosing the child's sex.

=== For general health ===
Conventional methods of sperm sorting have been widely used to assess quality of sperm before subsequent artificial insemination or in-vitro fertilization. It has been verified that sperm sorted using these techniques is of superior quality than unsorted. However, important characteristics of sperm such as DNA integrity remain untested by these conventional methods. New flow-cytometry based techniques such as YO-PRO staining can discriminate apoptotic and dead spermatozoa from the viable ones. For example, annexin V staining followed by MACS can significantly improve pregnancy rates in couples with previous assisted reproduction failure.

=== For sex selection ===
==== In farming ====
Sperm sorting by flow cytometry is an established technique in veterinary practice, and in the dairy industry most female cows are artificially inseminated with sorted semen to increase the number of female calves (using sperm sorting is less common in other species of farm animals, however artificial insemination is common). Artificial insemination of farm animals with sorted sperm is recognized by the Food and Agriculture Organization (FAO) as a promising way of increasing efficiency of agriculture needed to produce enough food for the growing human population. Utilizing artificial insemination with sorted sperm is seen as a way to create an optimal ratio of male and female calves to increase dairy milk production.

==== In humans ====
Choosing the sex of children might help prevent sex-associated heritable diseases such as Duchene muscular dystrophy or haemophilia in families with a history of these diseases. On the other hand, sperm sorting in humans raises the ethical concerns implicit to the idea of sex selection. If applied large-scale, it has a potential to elicit a sex-ratio imbalance. It could also have implications on gender equality if parents consistently choose to have a boy as their first-born (first-borns were shown to be more likely to succeed in life).

There is no country in the world which explicitly permits sex selection for non-medical purposes. There were 31 countries in 2009 which allowed sex selection in case of sex-linked disease risk or other medical purpose. In the US, for humans, the application of sperm sorting in sex selection is tightly regulated by the FDA. After the establishment of the MicroSort technique, it was offered to parents as a part of a clinical trial. The procedure was made available to a limited number of participants each month, in addition to fulfilling certain criteria, such as having a disease with sex linkage or having at least one child (for family balancing). There are currently MicroSort laboratories and collaborating physicians in several countries (some for general purposes, some only offering service in case of genetic disease risks associated with one sex).

While highly accurate, sperm sorting by flow cytometry will not produce two completely separate populations. That is to say, there will always be some "male" sperm among the "female" sperm and vice versa. The exact percentage purity of each population is dependent on the species being sorted and the 'gates' which the operator places around the total population visible to the machine. In general, the larger the DNA difference between the X and Y chromosome of a species, the easier it is to produce a highly pure population. In sheep and cattle, purities for each sex will usually remain above 90% depending on 'gating', while for humans these may be reduced to 90% for "female" spermatozoa and 70% for "male" spermatozoa.

== See also ==
- Preimplantation genetic diagnosis
