= Serosorting =

Choosing sexual partners based on their HIV status

Serosorting, also known as serodiscrimination, is the practice of using HIV status as a decision-making point in choosing sexual behavior. The term is used to describe the behavior of a person who chooses a sexual partner assumed to be of the same HIV serostatus to engage in unprotected sex with them for a reduced risk of acquiring or transmitting HIV/AIDS.

Knowledge of HIV status is based on the result of a person's HIV test, with a positive result indicating that a person has HIV, and can potentially transmit the disease to others during any sexual contact involving an exchange of bodily fluids (e.g., unprotected anal or vaginal sex). There are many situations where determining their partner's serostatus outside clinical settings cannot be done with complete certainty, limiting the efficacy in mitigating the transmission of HIV/AIDS (or other STIs). As people do not typically engage in sex practices with the expectation of contracting or transmitting HIV, failed attempts at serosorting are a leading cause of the contraction of HIV among partners.

== Terms and etymology ==
The word serosorting comes from the Latin word serum, which refers to blood serum. Sorting refers to choosing partners based on HIV status, which can be determined from blood tests, among other methods. Serodiscordant sex refers to sex between an HIV-positive person and an HIV-negative person. Typically, partners practicing serosorting make an attempt to find someone with a matching HIV test result, otherwise known as a seroconcordant partner.

== Risks ==
=== Failure to accurately determine HIV status ===
Failure to accurately determine HIV status may stem from people not being sure of their true HIV status or not admitting to having HIV. A recent negative result from an HIV test may not be definitive of a person's serostatus, because if they are still within the window period following a recent infection, the antibodies that the blood tests measure will not be present yet. In addition, testing negative for HIV does not guarantee that they are free of other sexually transmitted infections (STIs) such as HPV or hepatitis B.

The largest experiment with serosorting has been conducted in the adult film industry by the Adult Industry Medical Healthcare Foundation. The Adult Industry Medical testing program, or AIM, eliminates virtually all possibility of lying and enforces a high frequency of testing for a variety of STIs that can make the transmission of HIV more likely. All actors in legitimate adult films are tested twice a year for herpes, gonorrhea, chlamydia, syphilis, hepatitis types A, B and C, and HIV—as well as monthly for HIV, gonorrhea, and chlamydia. Before this program of testing, adult film actors had a very high rate of STIs, but now have only a 20% higher rate of STIs than the general public.

=== Substitution for condom use ===
Matthew Golden of King County Public Health, in Washington, conducted a study with sexually active West Coast men and concluded that the patient population demonstrated limited protection from HIV by serosorting. In his study, 3.5% of the men who used neither condoms nor serosorting became HIV-positive, as compared to 2.6% of the men that practiced serosorting alone, and 1.5% of the men who reported consistent condom use without serosorting.

Golden's population differs from AIM's in that anal sex made up a high proportion of the subjects' sexual habits, their testing intervals were typically longer and less regular, there were no tests for STIs other than HIV, such as chlamydia (an important factor considering other STIs may hasten the spread of the virus), and there were no protections against falsely reporting any of the results. Golden's study did not cover the use of serosorting combined with condoms—which, theoretically, would be more effective than either precaution used separately.

=== Disease exchange between seroconcordant people ===
Serosorting does not fully protect against all STIs during unprotected sex between two people infected with HIV. Infection with one strain of HIV does not preclude later infection with another strain. There is a great deal of genetic variability within individual HIV populations, because this variability is shuffled and mutated every time the virus (numbering in the millions) reproduces inside the infected person's body. Modern drug cocktails keep virus and mutation levels low but eventually drug resistance will develop. Unprotected sex between two HIV-positive individuals still presents the risk of one of them—with a relatively less aggressive strain of the virus—exchanging genetic sequences with their partner's more drug-resistant cousin, and becoming harder to treat. Furthermore, dual infection has been associated with a more rapid progression towards developing AIDS.

== Motivation ==
=== Lower rates of changing each other's serostatus ===
Studies have shown that serosorting provides some limited decrease in risk of contracting HIV among men who have sex with men (MSMs) who use it as an HIV risk reduction technique.

Although the practice has occurred informally since the AIDS pandemic began, serosorting has become more prevalent with online social networking sites now facilitating interactions, and even some health professionals citing harm reduction concepts for gay men as a measure to reduce the risk of acquiring HIV infection.

=== Bareback sex ===
Barebacking, or having male-to-male anal sex without using a condom, first became articulated in magazines such as POZ in 1995–96 as a practice taking place among HIV-positive men, and may be seen as an early articulation of serosorting.

== See also ==
- Serology
