= Sperm bank =

Facility that allocates human semen

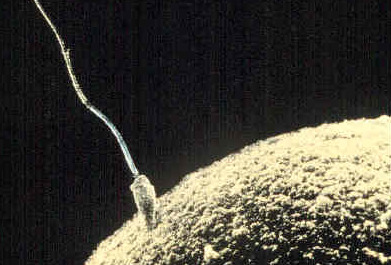
Electron microscopy image depicting sperm and egg in the process of fertilization

A sperm bank, semen bank, or cryobank is a facility that purchases, stores, and sells human semen. The semen is produced and sold by men who are known as sperm donors. The sperm is purchased by other persons for the purpose of achieving a pregnancy other than by a sexual partner. Sperm sold by a sperm donor is known as donor sperm.

A sperm bank may be a separate entity supplying donor sperm to individuals or to fertility clinics, or it may be a facility which is run by a clinic for their customers.

A pregnancy may be achieved using donor sperm for insemination with similar outcomes to sexual intercourse. By using sperm from a donor rather than from the sperm recipient's partner, the process is a form of third party reproduction. In the 21st century artificial insemination with donor sperm from a sperm bank is most commonly used for individuals with no male partner, such as single women and coupled lesbians.

A sperm donor must generally meet specific requirements regarding age and screening for adverse medical history. In the United States, sperm banks are regulated as Human Cell and Tissue or Cell and Tissue Bank Product (HCT/Ps) establishments by the Food and Drug Administration. Many states in the U.S. also have regulations in addition to those imposed by the FDA. In the European Union a sperm bank must have a license, according to the EU Tissue Directive. In the United Kingdom, sperm banks are regulated by the Human Fertilisation and Embryology Authority.

== General ==
The first sperm banks began as early as 1964 in Iowa, the United States, and Tokyo, Japan, and were established to support individuals who were infertile. As a result, over 1 million babies were born within 40 years.

Sperm banks provide individuals who otherwise would not be able to conceive naturally the opportunity to have a child. This includes, but is not limited to, single women, same-sexed couples, and couples where one partner is infertile.

In many parts of the world sperm banks are not allowed to be established or to operate. Where sperm banks are allowed to operate they are often controlled by local legislation which is primarily intended to protect the unborn child, but which may also provide a compromise between conflicting views which surround their operation. A particular example of this is the control which is often placed on the number of children which a single donor may father, which may be designed to protect against consanguinity. However, such legislation usually cannot prevent a sperm bank from supplying donor sperm outside the jurisdiction in which it operates, nor can it prevent sperm donors from donating elsewhere. There is a shortage of sperm donors in many parts of the world, and there is pressure from quarters for donor sperm from those willing and able to provide it to be made available as safely and as freely as possible.

== Recruitment ==
Finding a potential sperm donor, and motivating him to donate sperm, is referred to as recruitment. A sperm bank can recruit donors by advertising—-often in colleges, in local newspapers, and on the internet.

A donor must be a fit and healthy male, normally between 18 and 45 years of age, willing to undergo frequent rigorous testing. The donor must also be willing to donate his sperm so that it can be used to impregnate people who are unrelated to him whom he does not know. Some sperm banks require two screenings and a laboratory screening before a donor is eligible. The donor must agree to relinquish all legal rights to all children who result from his donations. The donor must produce his sperm at the sperm bank, thus enabling the identity of the donor, once proven, to be ascertained. Some sperm banks have been accused of heightism due to minimum height requirements.

== Screening of donors ==
A sperm bank will aim to provide donor sperm that is safe by screening donors and their semen. A sperm donor must generally meet specific requirements regarding age and medical history. Requirements for sperm donors are generally strictly enforced; in a study of 24,040 potential sperm donors, only 5,620 (23.38%) were eligible to donate their sperm.

Sperm banks typically screen potential donors for a range of diseases and disorders, including genetic diseases, chromosomal abnormalities, and sexually transmitted infections that may be transmitted through sperm. Donors are generally subject to tests for infectious diseases such as human immunoviruses HIV (HIV-1 and HIV-2), human T-cell lymphotropic viruses (HTLV-1 and HTLV-2), syphilis, chlamydia, gonorrhea, hepatitis B virus, hepatitis C virus, cytomegalovirus (CMV), Trypanosoma cruzi and malaria as well as hereditary diseases such as cystic fibrosis, sickle cell anemia, familial Mediterranean fever, Gaucher's disease, thalassaemia, Tay–Sachs disease, Canavan's disease, familial dysautonomia, congenital adrenal hyperplasia, carnitine transporter deficiency. Some sperm banks may also use karyotyping to ensure donors are 46XY.

Some sperm banks disallow sexually active gay men from donating sperm due to the population's increased risk of HIV and hepatitis B.

The screening procedure generally also includes a quarantine period, in which the samples are frozen and stored for at least six months after which the donor will be re-tested for the STIs. This is to ensure that no new infections have been acquired or have developed during the period of donation. Providing the result is negative, the sperm samples can be released from quarantine and used. Common reasons for sperm rejection include suboptimal semen quality and STDs. Chromosomal abnormalities are also a cause for semen rejection, but are less common. Children conceived through sperm donation had a birth defect rate of almost a fifth compared with the general population in a 1983 study.

The sperm will be checked to ensure its fecundity and also to ensure that motile sperm will survive the freezing process. If a man is accepted as a sperm donor, his sperm will generally be constantly monitored, and samples of his blood will be taken at regular intervals. A sperm bank may provide a donor with dietary supplements containing herbal or mineral substances such as maca, zinc, vitamin E, and arginine which are designed to improve the quality and quantity of the donor's semen, as well as reduce the refractory time.

=== Failures ===
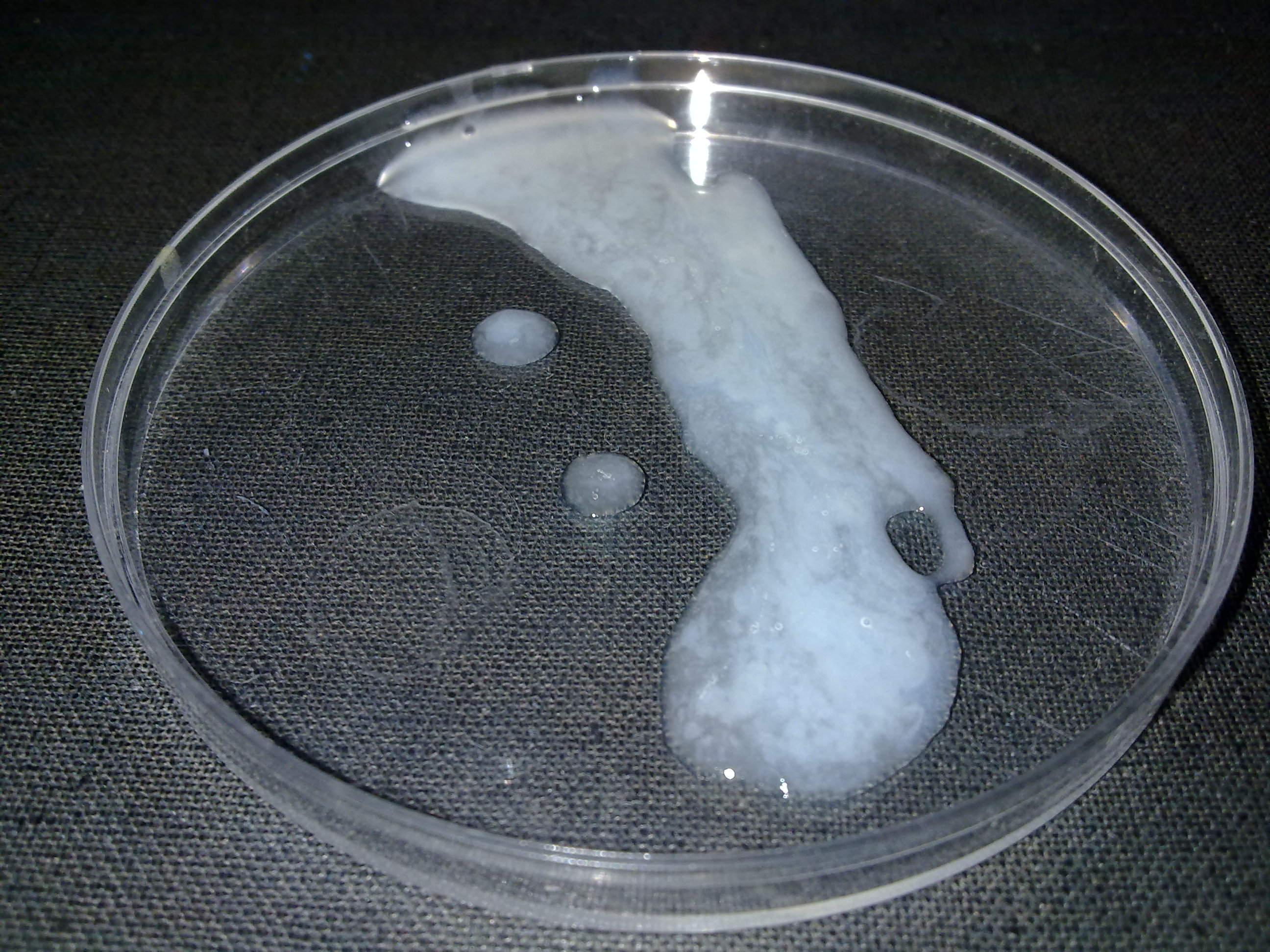
Human semen in a Petri dish

In 1995, the largest sperm bank in New York State was ordered to close (and no longer operate semen banks and blood banks), over the objections of its owner the Daxor Corporation and its president, CEO, and majority shareholder Joseph Feldschuh, by New York State Supreme Court Justice Harold Tompkins. The Justice found that Daxor had repeatedly endangered the public health over several years. A 1993 inspection had documented 517 violations by the sperm bank, including its failure to screen sperm donors properly for sexually transmitted diseases. Rather, the inspection showed that Daxor had, in fact, made available semen from men who had tested positive for hepatitis, chlamydia, and gonorrhea. Daxor employees told government investigators that Feldschuh had instructed them to make false entries on business records and to lie to investigators. Feldschuh claimed New York State Health Department officials were conspiring to shut down his business, sued them three times, appealed three times, and lost each of the six times.

The Daxor sperm bank was sued for negligence by customers. In one case, a White mother sued the sperm bank because though her White terminally ill husband's sperm had been stored at the sperm bank, when she asked for the sperm and used it to artificially inseminate her, she ended up giving birth to a Black baby.

In 2007 another mother settled her own claims against Daxor for $250,000, which she said was a fraction of the estimated $7 million in care that will be needed for both of her children. She said the Daxor donor of the sperm that she used had lied significantly about his education, and had failed to disclose that he was diagnosed with ADHD, did not speak until age 3, and attended a special school for children with learning and emotional disabilities; she said using his sperm led to both of her children being diagnosed with autism.

== Donor payment ==
Most sperm donors who donate their sperm through a sperm bank receive some payment, though this is rarely a significant amount. A 2012 review of 29 studies from nine countries found that the amount of money donors received varied from $10 to €70 per donation.

== Collection ==
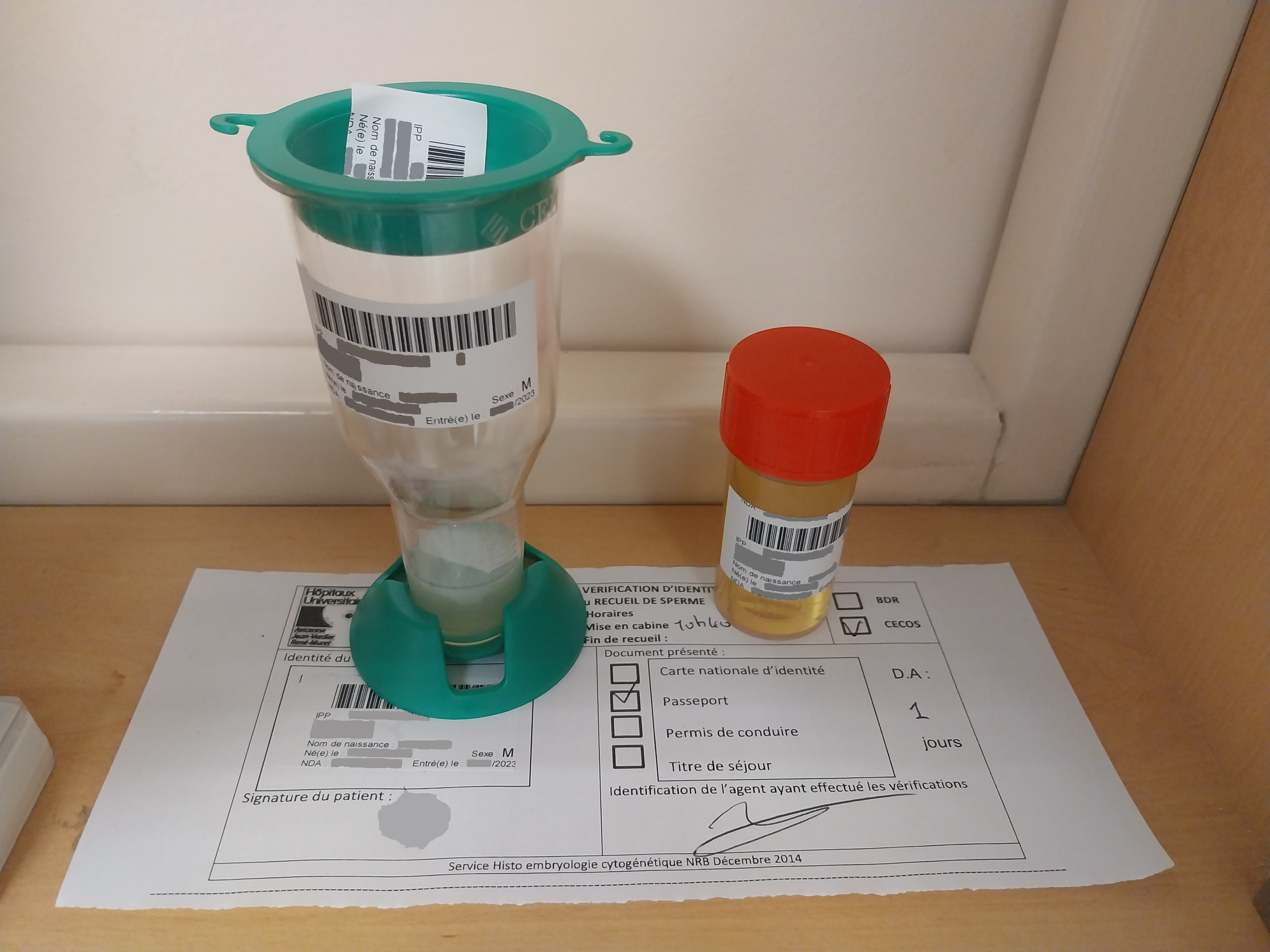
Semen and urine samples being donated at a sperm bank.

A sperm donor will usually be required to enter into a contract with a sperm bank to supply his semen, typically for a period of six to 24 months depending on the number of pregnancies which the sperm bank intends to produce from the donor.

The contract may also specify the place and hours for donation, a requirement to notify the sperm bank in the case the donor acquires a sexual infection, and a requirement not to have intercourse or to masturbate for a period of usually 2–3 days before making a donation.

A sperm donor generally produces and collects sperm at a sperm bank or clinic by masturbation in a private room or cabin, known as a 'men's production room' (UK), 'donor cabin' (DK), or a masturbatorium (US). Many of these facilities contain pornography such as videos/DVD, magazines, and/or photographs which may assist the donor in becoming aroused in order to facilitate production of the ejaculate, also known as the "semen sample" but the increasing usage of porn in the U.S. has dulled many men to its effects. Often, using any lubricant, saliva, oil, or anything else to lubricate and stimulate the genitals is prohibited, as it can contaminate the semen sample and have negative impacts on the quality and health of sperm. In some circumstances, it may also be possible for semen from donors to be collected during sexual intercourse with the use of a collection condom which results in higher sperm counts.

== Processing sperm ==
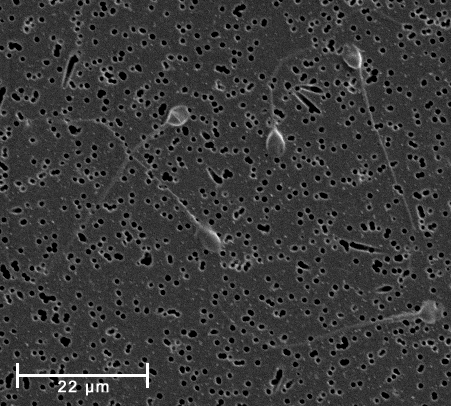
Human Spermatozoa are a primary component of normal semen, and the agents of fertilization of female ova.

After collection, sperm must be processed for storage. According to the Sperm Bank of California, sperm banks can use the 'unwashed' or 'wash' method to process sperm samples. The 'wash' method includes removing unwanted particles and adding buffer solutions to preserve viable sperm. However, this approach can contribute to further stress on the sperm cells and decrease the survival of sperm after freezing. The 'unwashed' approach allows for more flexibility to freeze the semen sample, and increases the number of sperm that survive.

A cryoprotectant semen extender is conducted if the semen sample is placed in a freezer for storage. Semen extenders play a key role in protecting sperm from 'freeze and osmotic shock, oxidative stress, and cell injury' due to the formation of ice crystals during frozen storage. The semen is preserved by stabilizing the properties of the sperm cells such as the membrane, motility, and 'DNA integrity' in order to create a sustainable viable environment. There are two common forms of medium for sperm cyropreservation, one containing egg yolk from hens and glycerol, and the other containing just glycerol. One study in 2009 compared media supplemented with egg yolk and media supplemented with soy lecithin, finding that there was no significance between sperm motility, morphology, chromatin decondensation, or binding between the two, indicating that soy lecithin may be a viable alternative to egg yolk.

== Storage ==
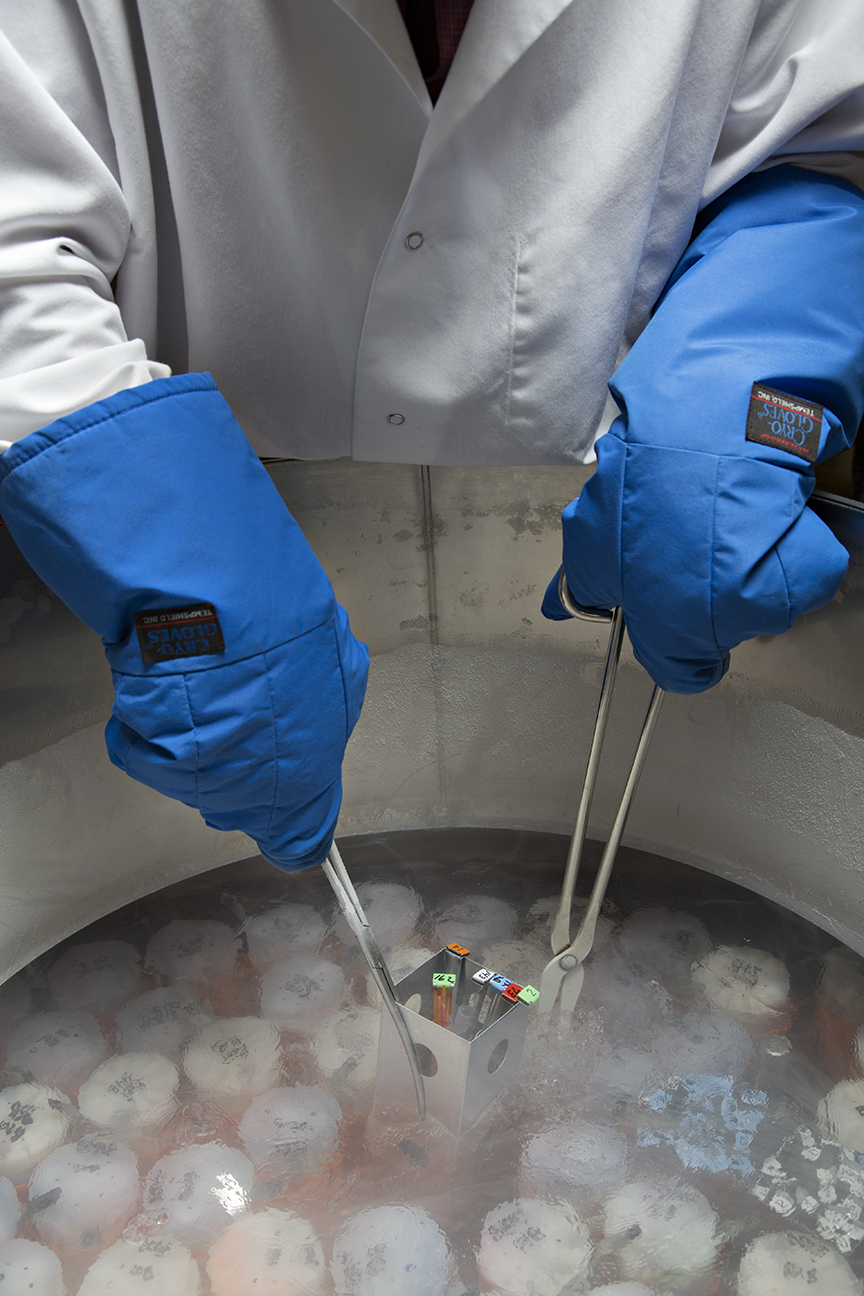
Cryopreservation

After the sample has been processed for cryoprotection, the sperm is stored in small vials or straws holding between 0.4 and 1.0 ml of sperm and then cryogenically preserved in liquid nitrogen tanks. Two approaches for sperm cryoperservation include conventional freezing and vitrification. The conventional technique consists of a slow freezing process that is most commonly used for assisted reproduction technologies (ART). Whereas the vitrification method is a faster approach for sperm cryopreservation in converting liquid to solid state. The disadvantage of this latter process is increase in contamination from the liquid nitrogen and smaller sperm sample size to improve the speed for 'high cooling rate'.

It has been proposed that there should be an upper limit on how long frozen sperm can be stored; however, a baby has been conceived in the United Kingdom using sperm frozen for 21 years and andrology experts believe sperm can be frozen indefinitely. The UK government places an upper limit for storage of 55 years.

Following the necessary quarantine period, which is usually six months, a sample will be thawed. To thaw a sperm sample, the vial or straw is left at room temperature for approximately 30 minutes, and then brought to body temperature by holding it in the hands of the person performing the insemination. Once a sperm sample is thawed, it cannot be frozen again, and should be used to artificially inseminate a recipient or used for another assisted reproduction technologies (ART) treatment immediately.

Freeze-drying is another promising alternative for storing semen for its accessibility with regular refrigeration. This method has been successfully replicated in animal species. However, DNA can be damaged in this process, therefore further research is warranted to determine factors that can affect the efficacy of this method.

== Demographics of people that utilize sperm donor/bank services ==
=== Demographics ===
One study conducted by investigators at the University of North Carolina Chapel Hill looked into donated sperm utilization within the United States from 1995 to 2017. Cross-sectional studies recorded that an estimated 170,701 individuals during 1995 used donated sperm, while the 2011 to 2013 cohort had a decreased amount of donated sperm use of 37,385. Most recently, in the 2015 to 2017 cohort, 440,986 individuals were reported to use donated sperm. When looking at 200,197 individuals across 2011–2017, 76% had a 4-year college degree or further while 24% had high school or 2-year college degree. In terms of household percent of poverty, 71% of the sperm bank users were at or above 400% of the household poverty level while only 11% were between 200 and 399% of the household poverty levels. Although the household income levels were not explicit, there seems to be an obvious trend that higher education level attainment (such as finishing college or higher) and being at much higher income level above the household poverty levels were the common tendencies in the sperm bank users.

=== Controversy ===
Based on the statistics presented in earlier discussions, there is controversy with regard to a perceived lack of diversity within the donor sperm pool of many sperm banks. This includes, but is not limited to, height requirements implemented by some sperm banks. As a result, it is alleged that potential sperm recipients often encounter very limited sperm donor pool options. Lack of diversity results in very limited choices especially among ethnic minorities within the United States. Whenever an individual chooses to specify their preferred donor background, the number of available options (sperm donors that meet the particular individual's criteria) can dwindle down to the low single digits. Scott Brown from California Cryobank admitted: "We don't get as many minority applicants as we [would] like." Even after numerous attempts to reach out to numerous ethnic communities, the response can be nearly nonexistent.

At the California Cryoback, Brown mentions that one out of 100 would be able to become final sperm donor while Ottey from the Fairfax Cryobank mentions one out of 200 would be able to become ultimate sperm donors. In addition, locations of the California Cryobank are in Los Angeles, Los Altos, California; mid-Manhattan, and Cambridge Massachusetts. These locations are known to have a population with higher socioeconomic latitude and being more likely to afford the services. Moreover, one of the requirements includes the potential sperm donor to be able to live nearby the sperm bank in order to provide samples once to twice a month for at least a term of six months.

Some controversy stems from the fact that donors father children for others, in the majority of cases, for single people or same-sex couples, but usually take no part in the upbringing of such children. The issue of sperm banks providing fertility services to single women and coupled lesbians so that they can have their own biological children by a donor is itself often controversial in some jurisdictions, but in many countries where sperm banks operate, this group form the main body of recipients. Donors usually do not have a say in who may be a recipient of their sperm.

Another controversy centers around the use of sperm posthumously, or after the death of the sperm donor, as pioneered by California Cryobank. Within the United States, there were differences when it came to a child conceived after the father's death and the eligibility for survivor's benefits. Under California law, there was one court case (Vernoff vs. Astrue) in which the mother's child (conceived after the father's death) was not eligible for the survivor's benefits. However, Arizona courts had a different approach when it came to children who were born after a father's death, holding that the children were eligible for the survivors benefits. There have been numerous other stories of similar situations across different states in the United States and even the United Kingdom. Canada, France, Germany, and Sweden do not permit the retrieval use of sperm posthumously.

== Services ==
=== Use ===
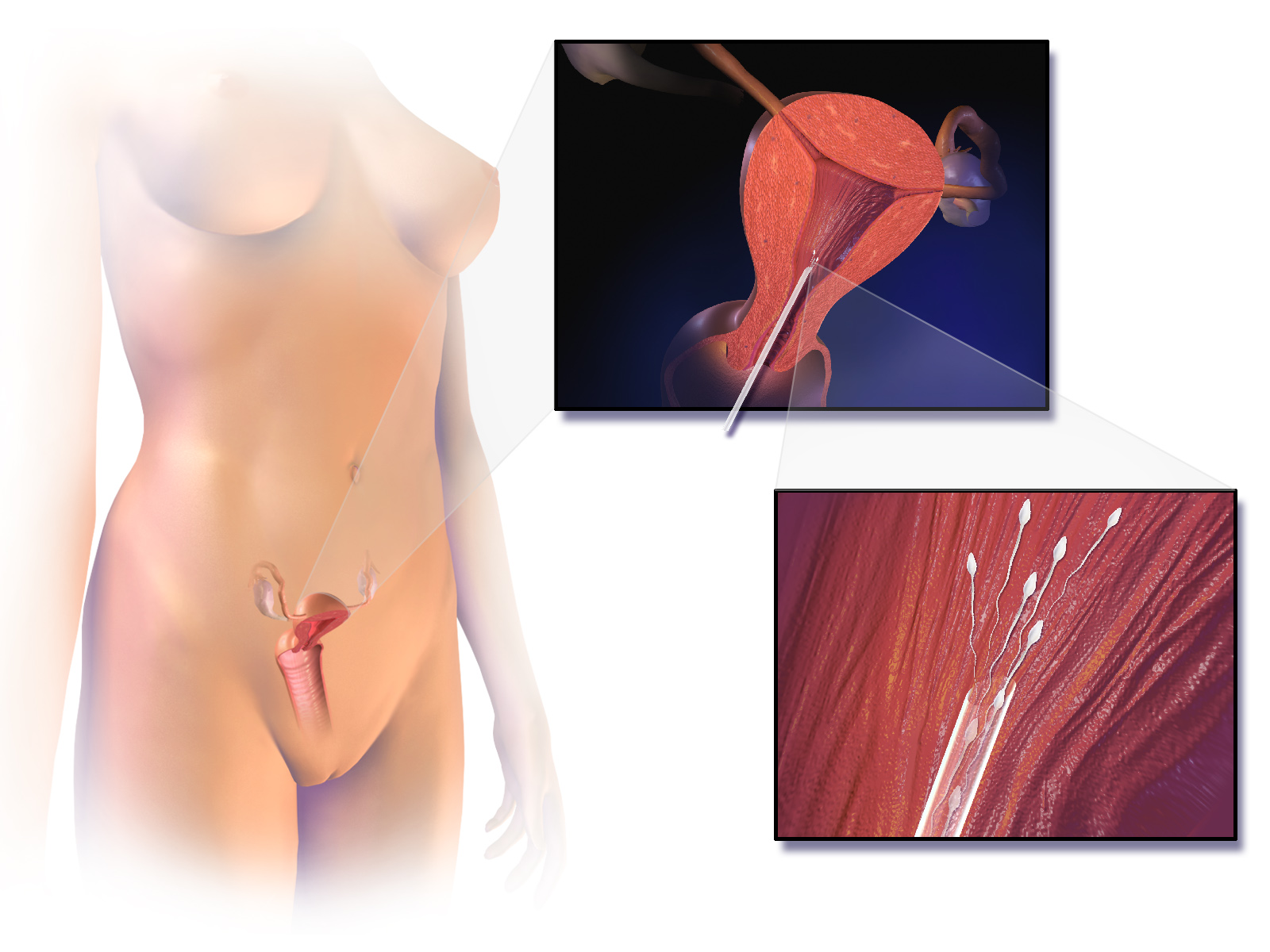
Schematic illustration of human artificial insemination.

Sperm is introduced into the recipient by means of artificial insemination or by IVF. The most common technique is conventional artificial insemination which consists of a catheter to put the sperm into the vagina where it is deposited at the entrance to the cervix. In biological terms, this is much the same process as when semen is ejaculated from the penis during sexual intercourse. Owing to its simplicity, this method of insemination is commonly used for home and self inseminations principally by single women and lesbians. Other types of uses include intrauterine insemination (IUI) and deep intrauterine artificial insemination where 'washed' sperm must be used. These methods of insemination are most commonly used in fertility centers and clinics mainly because they produce better pregnancy rates than ICI insemination especially where the woman has no underlying fertility issues.

=== Choosing donors ===
==== Information about donor ====
In the United States, sperm banks maintain lists of donors which provide basic information about the donor such as racial origin, skin color, height, weight, color of eyes, and blood group.

Qualities that potential recipients typically prefer in donors include the donors being tall, college educated, and with a consistently high sperm count. A review came to the result that 68% of donors had given information to the clinical staff regarding physical characteristics and education but only 16% had provided additional information such as hereditary aptitudes and temperament or character.

=== Recipient's selection of donors ===
Sperm banks make information available about the sperm donors whose donations they hold to enable customers to select the donor whose sperm they wish to use. This information is often available by way of an online catalog. Subscription fees to be able to view the sperm donor through California Cryobank, for example, start at $145.

Information made available by a sperm bank will usually include the race, height, weight, blood group, health and eye color of the donor. Sometimes information about the donor's age, family history and educational achievements will also be given. Some sperm banks make a 'personal profile' of a donor available and occasionally more information may be purchased about a donor, either in the form of a DVD or in written form. Catalogs usually state whether samples supplied by a particular donor have already given rise to pregnancies, but this is not necessarily a guide to the fecundity of the sperm since a donor may not have been in the program long enough for any pregnancies to have been recorded. The donor's educational qualification is also taken into account when choosing a donor.

=== Sex selection ===
Some sperm banks enable recipients to choose the sex of their child, through methods of sperm sorting. Although the methods used do not guarantee 100% success, the chances of being able to select the gender of a child are held to be considerably increased.

Sex selection is controversial, and is illegal in many countries, including Australia, the United Kingdom, and Canada, except when there is a large possibility of a sex-linked genetic disorder. It is legal in the United States, although use for non-medical reasons is discouraged by the American Society for Reproductive Medicine.

== Regulation ==
In the United States, the sperm bank industry is largely unregulated federally, with no laws against fertility fraud, no national registry, no requirement of open-ID at 18 donors or release of information to the donor conceived person, and no limit to the number of children born from each donor. Sperm banks are regulated as Human Cell and Tissue or Cell and Tissue Bank Product (HCT/Ps) establishments by the Food and Drug Administration (FDA), effective May 25, 2005. This requires a physical exam, screening for STIs including HIV, and a psychological evaluation. It also bars men who have had sex with men in the last 5 years from donating, which is widely regarded as homophobic, as donors are already tested for HIV, and men who practice unprotected sex with many women are allowed to donate, but not men who are in a monogamous relationship with a man.

As with other forms of third party reproduction, the use of donor sperm from a sperm bank gives rise to a number of moral, legal, and ethical issues, including, but not limited to the right of the sperm donor remaining anonymous, and the child's right to know their familial background.

Furthermore, as local regulations reduce the size of the donor pool and, in some cases, exclude entire classes of potential buyers such as single women and lesbian couples, restricting donations to only heterosexual couples who are married. Some customers choose to buy abroad or on the internet, having the samples delivered at home.

== Abuse ==
There have been reports of incidents of abuse regarding forced insemination with sperm samples bought online.

Further abuse of sperm banks comes from the fertility clinic staff themselves. There have been a number of reports of staff at sperm banks and fertility clinics providing their own sperm in place of donor sperm. There have also been cases in which men have claimed their sperm sample was used by a clinic to inseminate a woman without his consent. This has led to cases of malpractice, and in some states, lobbying to create fertility fraud laws. These incidents have also led to outcry by people who had been conceived by such incidents, raising concerns of consanguinity, as well as the simple right to know who their siblings and biologic parents are.

== See also ==
- Accidental incest
- Assisted reproduction
- Designer babies
- Donor conceived people
- Gene bank
- Genetic counseling
- Genetic testing
- Milk bank
- New eugenics
- Ova bank
- Surrogacy
