= Werling v. Sandy =

1985 Ohio Supreme Court case

- Court: Supreme Court of Ohio
- Full case name: Werling, ADMX., Appellant, v. Sandy et al., Appellees.
- Decided: April 24, 1985
- Citation: 17 Ohio St. 3d 45

Court membership
- Judges sitting: Frank D. Celebrezze, Robert E. Holmes, Clifford F. Brown, A. William Sweeney, Andrew Douglas, J. Craig Wright, Donald R. Ford (Note: Appellate judge of Eleventh District; sitting in place of Ralph S. Locher)

Case opinions
- Decision by: Holmes
- Concurrence: Celebrezze, Sweeney, Ford, C. Brown, Wright, Douglas

Werling v. Sandy, 17 Ohio St. 3d 45 (1985), was a case decided by the Supreme Court of Ohio that first recognized the cause of action for the wrongful death of a fetus in that state.

== Decision ==
The parents of a stillborn fetus sued for wrongful death, and the trial court dismissed the complaint on the grounds that there was no such cause of action. The Supreme Court of Ohio held that a cause of action would lie. The court recognized several statutory indicators that a stillborn fetus might properly be considered a decedent, including clauses in the Uniform Anatomical Gift Act and the rule against perpetuities. The court also recognized the arbitrariness of allowing recovery for wrongful death caused by negligently inflicted prenatal injuries in the case where the death occurs shortly after a live birth and disallowing recovering when the death occurred shortly before birth. The court held that the wrongful death action would only lie for a viable fetus that was carried full term.
