= Artificial insemination =

Pregnancy through in vivo fertilization

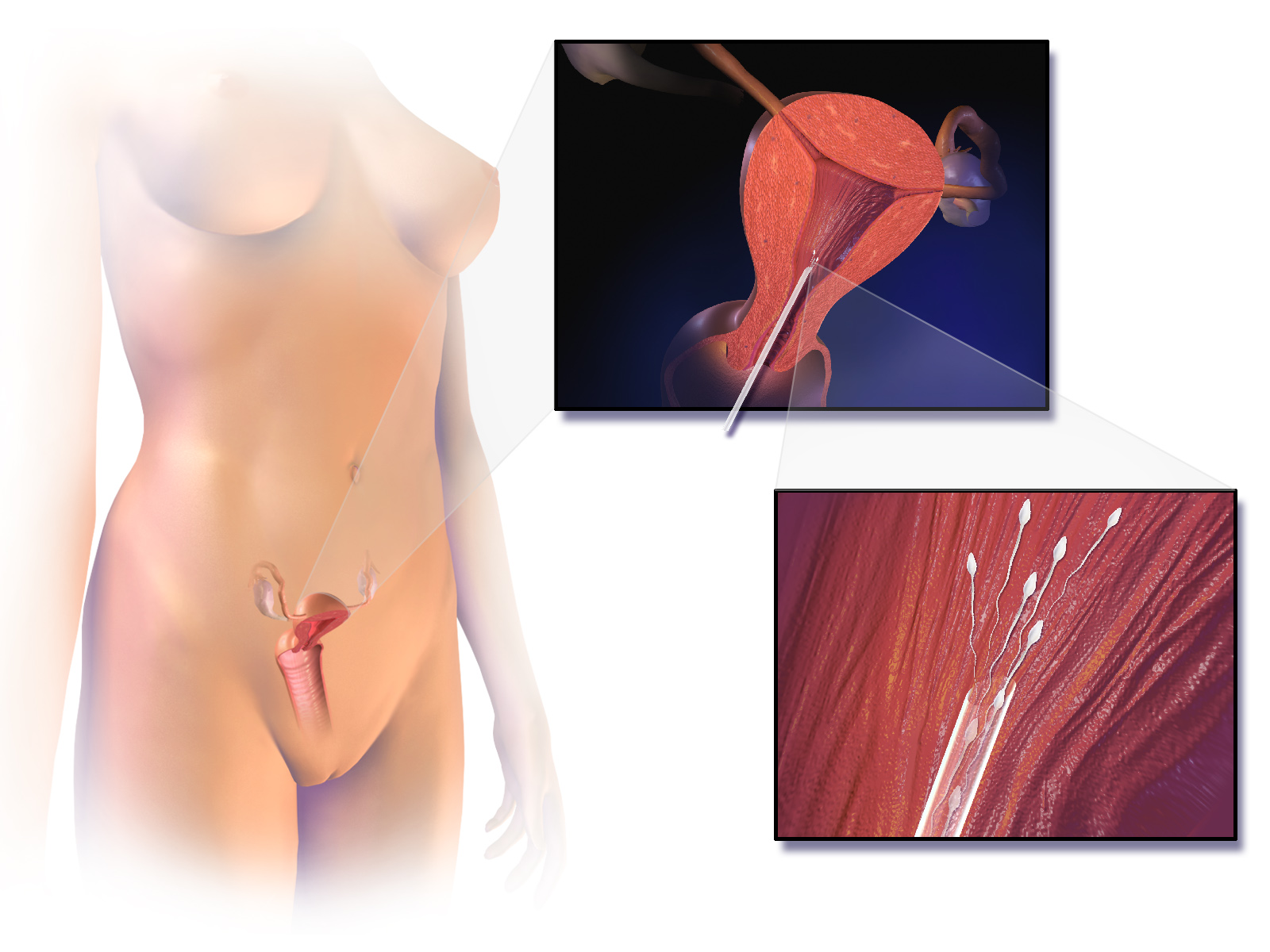
- Schematic illustration of human artificial insemination
- ICD-9-CM: 69.92
- MeSH: D007315

Artificial insemination is the deliberate introduction of sperm into the cervix or uterine cavity for the purpose of achieving pregnancy through in vivo fertilization by means other than sexual intercourse. It is a fertility treatment for humans, and is a common practice in animal breeding, including cattle (see frozen bovine semen) and pigs.

Artificial insemination may employ assisted reproductive technology, sperm donation and animal husbandry techniques. Artificial insemination techniques available include intracervical insemination (ICI) and intrauterine insemination (IUI). Where gametes from a third party are used, the procedure may be known as 'assisted insemination'.

== Humans ==
=== History ===
The first recorded case of artificial insemination was by Lazzaro Spallanzani in 1784, who performed it on a dog. It was followed in 1790 by John Hunter, who helped impregnate a linen draper's wife. The first reported case of artificial insemination by donor occurred in 1884: William H. Pancoast, a professor in Philadelphia, took sperm from his "best looking" student to inseminate an anesthetized woman without her knowledge. The case was reported 25 years later in a medical journal. The sperm bank was developed in Iowa starting in the 1950s in research conducted by University of Iowa medical school researchers Jerome K. Sherman and Raymond Bunge.

In 1916, Australian eugenicist Marion Louisa Piddington published a pseudonymous tract titled Via Nuova or Science & Maternity in which she called for a programme of mass artificial insemination for the sweethearts of soldiers who had been killed in World War I. She described this as a "conscription of the virgins" – comparable to the conscription of men for military service – who would receive "artificial insemination from a eugenically-desirable donor". Piddington promoted her scheme for several years in Australia, Britain and the United States under the name of "scientific motherhood", but it was poorly received.

In the United Kingdom, British obstetrician Mary Barton founded one of the first fertility clinics to offer donor insemination in the 1930s, with her husband Bertold Wiesner fathering hundreds of offspring.

In the 1980s, direct intraperitoneal insemination (DIPI) was occasionally used, where doctors injected sperm into the lower abdomen through a surgical hole or incision, with the intention of letting them find the oocyte at the ovary or after entering the genital tract through the ostium of the fallopian tube.

=== Patients and gamete donors ===
Artificial insemination (AI) is a medical procedure in which sperm is introduced into a woman's reproductive system to achieve pregnancy without sexual intercourse. The sperm used may come from the recipient's partner or from a donor, whose identity may be known or anonymous. Various methods exist to obtain sperm for use in artificial insemination.

In 2016, an article was published in Seventeen magazine that highlighted the story of Kacie Saxer-Taulbee, a teenager conceived from a sperm donor father. Using her donor's cryobank number in the Donor Sibling Registry, she managed to find other siblings conceived from the same donor. They became known as the "5010ers" and formed a Facebook group to keep in touch.

==== Barriers for patients and donors ====
Some countries have laws which restrict and regulate who can donate sperm and who is able to receive artificial insemination.

=== Preparations ===
Timing is critical, as the window and opportunity for fertilization is little more than twelve hours from the release of the ovum. To increase the chance of success, the woman's menstrual cycle is closely observed, often using ovulation kits, ultrasounds or blood tests, such as basal body temperature tests over, noting the color and texture of the vaginal mucus, and the softness of the nose of her cervix. To improve the success rate of artificial insemination, drugs to create a stimulated cycle may be used, but the use of such drugs also results in an increased chance of a multiple birth.

Sperm can be provided fresh or washed.

=== Techniques ===
The human female reproductive system. The cervix is part of the uterus. The cervical canal connects the interiors of the uterus and vagina.

Semen used is either fresh, raw, or frozen.

==== Intracervical ====
Intracervical insemination (ICI) is the method of artificial insemination which most closely mimics the natural ejaculation of semen by the penis into the vagina during sexual intercourse. It is painless and is the simplest and most common method of artificial insemination involving the introduction of unwashed or raw semen into the vagina at the entrance to the cervix, usually by means of a needle-less syringe. The vagina acts as a filter to separate out the sperm from other chemicals in the ejaculate, as with intercourse, so that only sperm pass through the cervix on their way to the uterus.

Although ICI is the simplest method of artificial insemination, a meta-analysis has shown no difference in live birth rates compared with IUI.

During ICI, air is expelled from a needleless syringe which is then filled with semen which has been allowed to liquify. A specially designed syringe, wider and with a more rounded end, may be used for this purpose. Any further enclosed air is removed by gently pressing the plunger forward. The woman lies on her back and the syringe is inserted into the vagina. Care is optimal when inserting the syringe, so that the tip is as close to the entrance to the cervix as possible. A vaginal speculum may be used for this purpose and a catheter may be attached to the tip of the syringe to ensure delivery of the semen as close to the entrance to the cervix as possible. The plunger is then slowly pushed forward and the semen in the syringe is gently emptied deep into the vagina. It is important that the syringe is emptied slowly for safety and for the best results, bearing in mind that the purpose of the procedure is to replicate as closely as possible a natural deposit of the semen in the vagina. The syringe (and catheter if used) may be left in place for several minutes before removal. The woman can bring herself to orgasm so that the cervix 'dips down' into the pool of semen, again replicating closely vaginal intercourse, and this may improve the success rate.

When performed at home without the presence of a professional, aiming the sperm in the vagina at the neck of the cervix may be more difficult to achieve and the effect may be to 'flood' the vagina with semen, rather than to target it specifically at the entrance to the cervix. This procedure is sometimes referred to as 'intravaginal insemination' (IVI).

A conception cap, which is a form of conception device, may be inserted into the vagina following insemination and may be left in place for several hours

==== Intrauterine ====
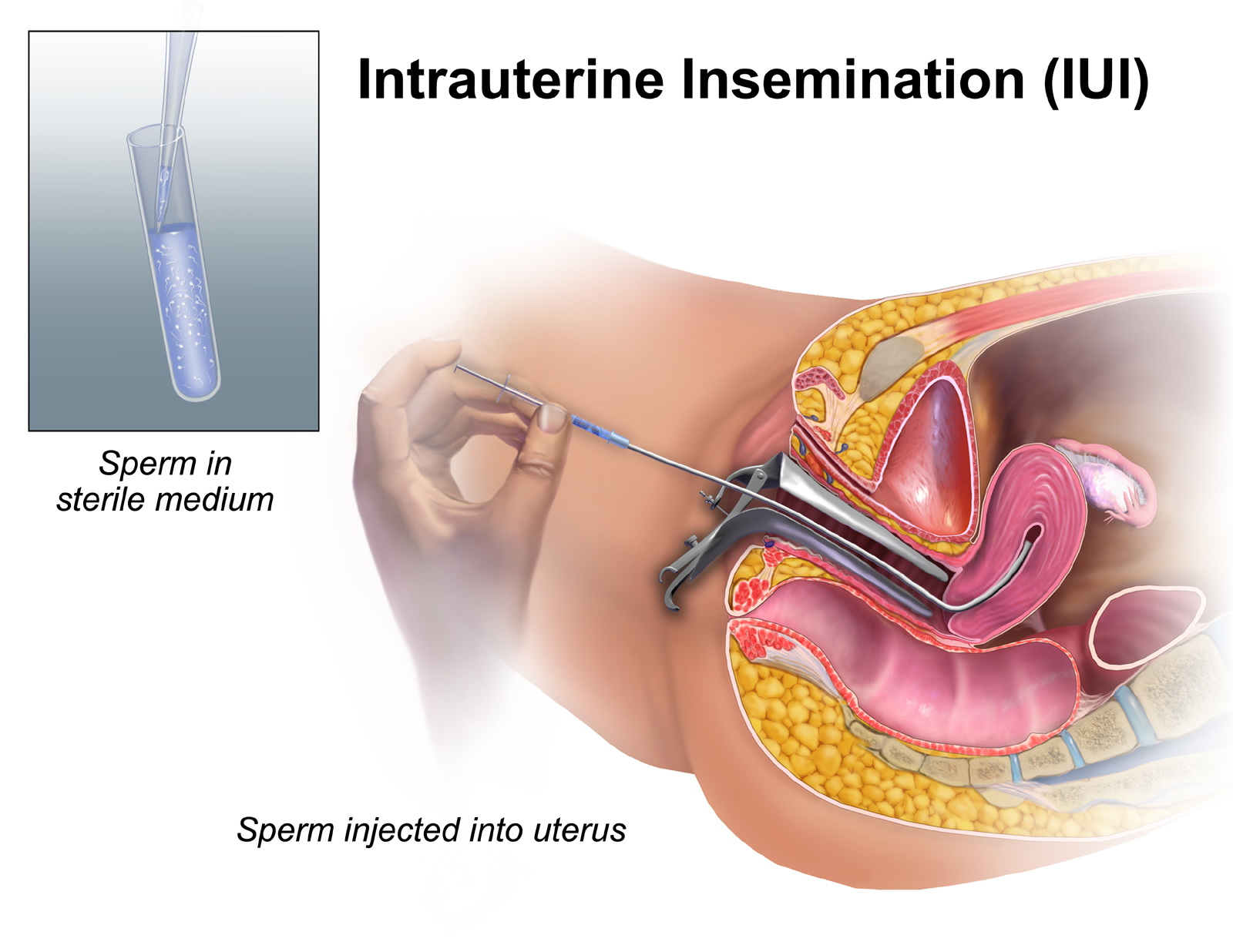

Intrauterine insemination (IUI) involves injection of 'washed' sperm directly into the uterus with a catheter. Washing involves the removal of chemicals other than sperm which are in the natural ejaculate. In forms of vaginal insemination, including artificial vaginal insemination and ICI, these chemicals will be filtered out by the vagina. Insemination in this way also means that the sperm do not have to swim through the cervix which is coated with a mucus layer. This layer of mucus can slow down the passage of sperm and can result in many sperm perishing before they can enter the uterus. Donor sperm is sometimes tested for mucus penetration if it is to be used for ICI inseminations but partner sperm may or may not be able to pass through the cervix. In these cases, the use of IUI can provide a more efficient delivery of the sperm. In general terms, IUI is usually regarded as more efficient than ICI or IVI. It is therefore the method of choice for single and lesbian women wishing to conceive using donor sperm since this group of recipients usually require artificial insemination because they do not have a male partner, not because they have medical problems. Owing to the high number of these recipients using donor sperm services, IUI is therefore the most popular method of insemination today at a fertility clinic. The term 'artificial insemination' has, in many cases, come to mean IUI insemination.

It is important that washed sperm is used because unwashed sperm may elicit uterine cramping, expelling the semen and causing pain, due to content of prostaglandins. (Prostaglandins are also the compounds responsible for causing the myometrium to contract and expel the menses from the uterus, during menstruation.) Resting on the table for fifteen minutes after an IUI is optimal for the woman to increase the pregnancy rate.

For heterosexual couples, the indications to perform an intrauterine insemination are usually a moderate male factor, the incapability to ejaculate in vagina and an idiopathic infertility. A short period of ejaculatory abstinence before intrauterine insemination is associated with higher pregnancy rates. For the man, a TMS of more than 5 million per ml is optimal. In practice, donor sperm will satisfy these criteria and since IUI is a more efficient method of artificial insemination than ICI and, because of its generally higher success rate, IUI is usually the insemination procedure of choice for single women and lesbians using donor semen in a fertility centre. Lesbians and single women are less likely to have fertility issues of their own and enabling donor sperm to be inserted directly into the womb will often produce a better chance of conceiving. A 2019 showed that pregnancy rates were similar between lesbian women and heterosexual women undergoing IUI. However, it was found that there is a significantly higher multiple gestation rate among lesbian women undergoing ovulation induction (OI) when compared to lesbian women undergoing natural cycles.

Unlike ICI, intrauterine insemination normally requires a medical practitioner to perform the procedure. One of the requirements is to have at least one permeable tube, proved by hysterosalpingography. The infertility duration is also important. A female under 30 years of age has optimal chances with IUI; A promising cycle is one that offers two follicles measuring more than 16 mm, and estrogen of more than 500 pg/mL on the day of hCG administration. However, GnRH agonist administration at the time of implantation does not improve pregnancy outcome in intrauterine insemination cycles according to a randomized controlled trial. One of the prominent private clinic in Europe has published a data A multiple logistic regression model showed that sperm origin, maternal age, follicle count at hCG administration day, follicle rupture, and the number of uterine contractions observed after the second insemination procedure were associated with the live-birth rate The steps to follow in order to perform an intrauterine insemination are:

- Mild controlled ovarian stimulation (COS): there is no control of how many oocytes are at the same time when stimulating ovulation. For that reason, it is necessary to check the amount being ovulated via ultrasound (checking the amount of follicles developing at the same time) and administering the desired amount of hormones.
- Ovulation induction: using substances known as ovulation inductors.
- Semen capacitation: wash and centrifugation, swim-up, or gradient. The insemination should not be performed later than an hour after capacitation. 'Washed sperm' may be purchased directly from a sperm bank if donor semen is used, or 'unwashed semen' may be thawed and capacitated before performing IUI insemination, provided that the capacitation leaves a minimum of, usually, five million motile sperm.
- Luteal phase support: a lack of progesterone in the endometrium could end a pregnancy. To avoid that 200 mg/day of micronized progesterone are administered via vagina. If there is pregnancy, this hormone is kept administering until the tenth week of pregnancy.

The cost breakdown for Intrauterine Insemination (IUI) involves several components. The procedure itself typically ranges from $300 to $1,000 per cycle without insurance. The cost of the sperm may vary widely, with prices per vial ranging from $500 to $1,000 or more from a sperm bank. Additional expenses might include consultation fees, ovulation-inducing medication, ultrasounds, and blood tests.

The extent of insurance coverage for fertility treatments, including Intrauterine Insemination (IUI), varies considerably. Some insurance plans may cover some of the costs, while others may not provide any financial support for fertility treatments. Coverage depends on various factors, such as the insurance plan, state policies and regulations, and the underlying cause of infertility. Several states have mandated insurers to provide coverage for infertility services.

IUI can be used in conjunction with controlled ovarian hyperstimulation (COH). Clomiphene Citrate is the first line, Letrozole is second line, in order to stimulate ovaries before moving on to IVF. Still, advanced maternal age causes decreased success rates; women aged 38–39 years appear to have reasonable success during the first two cycles of ovarian hyperstimulation and IUI. However, for women aged over 40 years, there appears to be no benefit after a single cycle of COH/IUI. Medical experts therefore recommend considering in vitro fertilization after one failed COH/IUI cycle for women aged over 40 years.

A double intrauterine insemination theoretically increases pregnancy rates by decreasing the risk of missing the fertile window during ovulation. However, a randomized trial of insemination after ovarian hyperstimulation found no difference in live birth rate between single and double intrauterine insemination. A Cochrane found uncertain evidence about the effect of IUI compared with timed intercourse or expectant management on live birth rates but IUI with controlled ovarian hyperstimulation is probably better than expectant management.

Due to the lack of reliable evidence from controlled clinical trials, it is not certain which semen preparation techniques are more effective (wash and centrifugation; swim-up; or gradient) in terms of pregnancy and live birth rates.

Intrauterine insemination success factors

Intrauterine insemination (IUI) procedures have shown to be more successful and effective with certain factors taken into account. One major factor is the health of the sperm that is used. Sperm motility, which is improved by the sperm washing procedure, sperm density, and the sperm concentration index, all of which are found through washing and studying of the health of the specimen, are major indicators of a positive pregnancy test following IUI.

The age of both the male and female (egg and sperm donors) involved in the process are extremely important. Although age has typically been pinned on the women as a determining factor, research shows that both male and female age has about equal impact on the success of the procedure. Along with age, the duration of fertility is also found to be a factor in IUI success, the longer one faces infertility, the lower the chance of a positive pregnancy test occurring. When people talk about age as a risk factor, they are generally speaking to the way in which the DNA in the eggs and sperm have increased probabilities of mutations.

Lastly, the biological factors of the female's body can have some impact on the success of the IUI procedure. The endometrial thickness at time of insemination is moderately important, though less of a concern than some of the other factors. The number of follicles developed, grown, and retrieved from the ovaries during ovarian stimulation is particularly important and a major success factor in fertility treatments. And lastly, for the female partner, the estradiol concentration within the body on the day of HCG administration.

Who IUI can be used for

Because IUI is less expensive and less invasive than other fertility options (for example, in vitro fertilisation, or IVF), it is typically the first outlet for those looking for fertility treatments. For individuals or couples who struggle with getting pregnant, but haven't explored any fertility treatments yet, they would be good candidates for IUI. IUI provides those with a more affordable and accessible outlet for fertility treatments, however, IUI may not be the most successful option if it is determined to be female factor infertility. IUI is also a very good option for single individuals who are using donor sperm, as donor sperm undergoes regulations and checks which may not be the case for a partner sperm donation. IUI can additionally be a good fertility outlet for lesbian or queer couples as they most often do not face infertility, and would most likely be using regulated and checked donor sperm. Furthermore, surrogates can be artificially inseminated through IUI to help other individuals and/or couples become pregnant with their sperm.

==== Intrauterine tuboperitoneal ====
Intrauterine tuboperitoneal insemination (IUTPI) involves injection of washed sperm into both the uterus and fallopian tubes. The cervix is then clamped to prevent leakage to the vagina, best achieved with a specially designed double nut bivalve (DNB) speculum. The sperm is mixed to create a volume of 10 ml, sufficient to fill the uterine cavity, pass through the interstitial part of the tubes and the ampulla, finally reaching the peritoneal cavity and the Pouch of Douglas where it would be mixed with the peritoneal and follicular fluid. IUTPI can be useful in unexplained infertility, mild or moderate male infertility, and mild or moderate endometriosis. In non-tubal sub fertility, fallopian tube sperm perfusion may be the preferred technique over intrauterine insemination.

==== Intratubal ====
Intratubal insemination (ITI) involves injection of washed sperm into the fallopian tube, although this procedure is no longer generally regarded as having any beneficial effect compared with IUI. ITI however, should not be confused with gamete intrafallopian transfer, where both eggs and sperm are mixed outside the woman's body and then immediately inserted into the fallopian tube where fertilization takes place.

=== Pregnancy rate ===
Approximate pregnancy rate as a function of total sperm count (may be twice as large as total motile sperm count). Values are for intrauterine insemination. (Old data, rates are likely higher these days)

The rates of successful pregnancy for artificial insemination are 10-15% per menstrual cycle using ICI, and 15–20% per cycle for IUI. In IUI, about 60 to 70% have achieved pregnancy after 6 cycles.

However, these pregnancy rates may be very misleading, since many factors have to be included to give a meaningful answer, e.g. definition of success and calculation of the total population. These rates can be influenced by age, overall reproductive health, and if the patient had an orgasm during the insemination. The literature is conflicting on immobilization after insemination has increasing the chances of pregnancy. Previous data suggests that it is statistically significant for the patient to remain immobile for 15 minutes after insemination, while another review article claims that it is not. A point of consideration, is that it does cost the patient or healthcare system to remain immobile for 15 minutes if it does increase the chances. For couples with unexplained infertility, unstimulated IUI is no more effective than natural means of conception.

The pregnancy rate also depends on the total sperm count, or, more specifically, the total motile sperm count (TMSC), used in a cycle. The success rate increases with increasing TMSC, but only up to a certain count, when other factors become limiting to success. The summed pregnancy rate of two cycles using a TMSC of 5 million (may be a TSC of ~10 million on graph) in each cycle is substantially higher than one single cycle using a TMSC of 10 million. However, although more cost-efficient, using a lower TMSC also increases the average time taken to achieve pregnancy. Women whose age is becoming a major factor in fertility may not want to spend that extra time.

=== Samples per child ===
The number of samples (ejaculates) required to give rise to a child varies substantially from person to person, as well as from clinic to clinic. However, the following equations generalize the main factors involved:

For intracervical insemination:

$$N = \frac{V_s \times c \times r_s}{n_r}$$

- N is how many children a single sample can give rise to.
- V_{s} is the volume of a sample (ejaculate), usually between 1.0 mL and 6.5 mL
- c is the concentration of motile sperm in a sample after freezing and thawing, approximately 5–20 million per ml but varies substantially
- r_{s} is the pregnancy rate per cycle, between 10% and 35%
- n_{r} is the total motile sperm count recommended for vaginal insemination (VI) or intra-cervical insemination (ICI), approximately 20 million pr. ml.

The pregnancy rate increases with increasing number of motile sperm used, but only up to a certain degree, when other factors become limiting instead.

Derivation of the equation (click at right to view)

In the simplest form, the equation reads:

$$N = \frac{n_s}{n_c} \times r_s$$

N is how many children a single sample can give rise to
n_{s} is the number of vials produced per sample
n_{c} is the number of vials used in a cycle
r_{s} is the pregnancy rate per cycle

n_{s} can be further split into:

$$n_s = \frac{V_s}{V_v}$$
n_{s} is the number of vials produced per sample
V_{s} is the volume of a sample
V_{v} is the volume of the vials used

n_{c} may be split into:

$$n_c = \frac{n_r}{n_s}$$
n_{c} is the number of vials used in a cycle
n_{r} is the number of motile sperm recommended for use in a cycle
n_{s} is the number of motile sperm in a vial

n_{s} may be split into:

$$n_s = V_v \times c$$
n_{s} is the number of motile sperm in a vial
V_{v} is the volume of the vials used
c is the concentration of motile sperm in a sample

Thus, the factors can be presented as follows:

$$N = \frac{V_s \times c \times r_s}{n_r} \times \frac{V_v}{V_v}$$
N is how many children a single sample can help giving rise to
V_{s} is the volume of a sample
c is the concentration of motile sperm in a sample
r_{s} is the pregnancy rate per cycle
n_{r} is the number of motile sperm recommended for use in a cycles
V_{v} is the volume of the vials used (its value does not affect N and may be eliminated. In short, the smaller the vials, the more vials are used)

Approximate live birth rate (r_{s}) among infertile couples as a function of total motile sperm count (n_{r}). Values are for intrauterine insemination.

With these numbers, one sample would on average help giving rise to 0.1–0.6 children, that is, it actually takes on average 2–5 samples to make a child.

For intrauterine insemination, a centrifugation fraction (f_{c}) may be added to the equation:

f_{c} is the fraction of the volume that remains after centrifugation of the sample, which may be about half (0.5) to a third (0.33).

$$N = \frac{V_s \times f_c \times c \times r_s}{n_r}$$

On the other hand, only 5 million motile sperm may be needed per cycle with IUI (n_{r}=5 million)

Thus, only 1–3 samples may be needed for a child if used for IUI.

=== Risk factors ===
The risk factors of artificial insemination are comparatively low to other forms of fertility treatment. The most prominent risk factor would be infection after the procedure, with other risk factors including a higher risk of having twins or triplets, and minor vaginal bleeding during the procedure.

Although these risk factors are minor and generally manageable, there is a significant knowledge gap between identity groups around risk factors for fertility treatments in general. For instance, it was found that LGBTQ+ individuals had "had significant knowledge gaps of risk factors associated with reproductive outcomes when compared to heterosexual female peers."

=== Legal restrictions ===
Some countries restrict artificial insemination in a variety of ways. For example, some countries do not permit AI for single women, and other countries do not permit the use of donor sperm.

==== Europe ====
As of May 2013, the following European countries permit medically assisted AI for single women:

- Armenia
- Belarus
- Belgium
- Bulgaria
- Cyprus
- Denmark
- Estonia
- Finland
- Germany
- Greece
- Hungary
- Iceland
- (Republic of Ireland) Ireland
- Latvia
- Moldova
- Montenegro
- Netherlands
- North Macedonia
- Romania
- Russia
- Spain
- Ukraine
- United Kingdom

==== Law in the United States ====
===== History of Law Around Artificial Insemination =====
Artificial insemination used to be seen as adultery and was illegal until the 1960s when states started recognizing the child born from artificial insemination as legitimate. Once the children began to be recognized as legitimate, legal questions around who the parents of the child are, how to handle surrogacy, paternity rights, and eventually artificial insemination and LGBT+ parents began to arise. Prior to the use of artificial insemination, the legal parents of a child were the two people who conceived the child or the person who birthed the child and their legal spouse, but artificial insemination complicates the legal process of becoming a parent as well as who is the parent of the child. Deciding who the parents of the child are is the largest legal predicament around artificial insemination. However, questions around surrogacy and donor's rights also appear as a side question to determining the parent(s). Some major cases that deal with artificial insemination and parental rights are, K.M v E.G, Johnson v Calvert, Matter of Baby M, and In Re K.M.H.

===== Legal Parental Relations and Artificial Insemination =====
When children are conceived the traditional way, there is little discrepancy around who the legal parents of the child are. However, because children conceived using artificial insemination may not be genetically related to one or more of their parents, who the legal parents of the child are can come into question. Prior to the passage of the Uniform Parentage Act in 1973, children conceived via artificial insemination were deemed as "illegitimate" children. The Uniform Parentage Act then recognized the children born from artificial insemination as legal and laid precedent for how the legal parents of the child were decided. However, this act applied only to the children of those married couples. It established that the person who birthed the child was the mother and the father would be the husband of the woman. In 2002, the Uniform Parentage Act, which is adopted individually on a state by state basis, was revised to address non married couples and states that an unmarried couple has the same rights to the child that a married couple would. This extended who has the right to be a parent to a man who would supposedly fill in the social role as a "father." There were now numerous ways to establish parental rights for both the mother and the father depending on if the child was born using a sperm donor or a surrogate. Currently, a revised version of the Uniform Parentage Act is starting to be passed in a few states that expands how parental relations can be determined. This bill includes expanding "father" to mean any person who would fill the role of a father, regardless of their gender and "mother" is expanded to anyone who gives birth to the child regardless of gender. In addition, this act would also change any language of "husband" or "wife" to "spouse."

===== Paternity rights =====
There is no federal law that applies to all fifty states when it comes to artificial insemination and paternity rights, but the Uniform Parentage Act is a model which many states have adopted. Under the 1973 UPA, married heterosexual couples making use of artificial insemination through a licensed physician could list the husband as the natural father of the child, rather than the sperm donor. Since then a revised version of the Act has been introduced, though to less widespread adoption

Generally paternity is not an issue when artificial insemination is between a married woman and an anonymous donor. Most states provide that anonymous donors' paternity claims are not recognized, and most sperm donation centers make use of contracts that require donors to sign away their paternity rights before they can participate. When the mother knows the donor, however, or engages in artificial insemination while unmarried, complications may arise. In cases of private sperm donation, paternity rights and responsibilities are often conferred onto sperm donors when: the donor and recipient did not comply with state laws regarding artificial insemination, the sperm donor and recipient know one another, or the donor had the intent of being a father to the child. When one or a number of these things is true, courts have at times found written agreements relinquishing parental rights to be unenforceable.

=== Cultural concerns ===
==== Religious opposition ====
Some theologically buttressed arguments reject the moral validity of this practice, such as Pope John XXIII. However, according to a document of the USCCB, the intrauterine insemination (IUI) of "licitly obtained" (normal intercourse with a silastic sheath i.e. a perforated condom) but technologically prepared semen sample (washed, etc.) has been neither approved nor disapproved by Church authority and its moral validity remains under discussion. Some religious groups, such as the Catholic Church, and individuals have also criticized artificial insemination because acquiring sperm for the procedure is seen as "a form of adultery promoting the vice of [[masturbation]]."

==== Other morality-based opposition ====
There are critics of artificial insemination who voice concerns regarding the potential for AI to encourage eugenicist practices through selection of particular traits. The line of reasoning follows the history of artificial insemination in breeding livestock and other domesticated animals wherein preferred traits are encouraged through human-controlled selection.

==== Social implications ====
One of the key issues arising from the rise of dependency on assisted reproductive technology (ARTs) is the pressure placed on couples to conceive, "where children are highly desired, parenthood is culturally mandatory, and childlessness socially unacceptable".

The medicalization of infertility creates a framework in which individuals are encouraged to think of infertility quite negatively. In many cultures donor insemination is religiously and culturally prohibited, often meaning that less accessible "high tech" and expensive ARTs, like IVF, are the only solution.

An over-reliance on reproductive technologies in dealing with infertility prevents many – especially, for example, in the "infertility belt" of central and southern Africa – from dealing with many of the key causes of infertility treatable by artificial insemination techniques; namely preventable infections, dietary and lifestyle influences.

If good records are not kept, the offspring when grown up risk accidental incest.

==== LGBTQ+ concerns ====
Although many fertilization procedures, like IUI are typically carried out in a medical setting, society is increasingly recognizing the important role that this plays in the lives of individuals who might otherwise not conceive through heterosexual penetrative sexual intercourse. Artificial insemination using a sperm donor for LGBTQ+ individuals and couples is one of the more cost-effective avenues to parenting. While clinic based IUI may be open to many, it typically still includes hetero-reproductive narratives which dates from the early days of fertilization procedures when these were often exclusively for married couples and when there was a resistance in many societies to extend these services to the LGBTQ+ community. Indeed, in the early days, there were very few fertility clinics which would provide services to single women and lesbian couples. In the UK, notable pioneers in this respect were the British Pregnancy Advisory Service (BPAS) and the Pregnancy Advisory Service (PAS), both of which operated before statutory control of fertility services in 1992, and the London Women's Clinic (LWC) which provided artificial insemination to single women and lesbians from 1998. Most donor insemination procedures undertaken in many countries today are for lesbian couples or single mainly lesbian women, yet much of their rhetoric and advertising is directed at heterosexual couples. Indeed, many sperm banks seem reluctant to inform donors that most of their donations will be used for lesbians and single women. To improve the way society talks about and carries out donor insemination inclusive language may be used. One way to do this is to bring LGBTQ narratives into this process, with a particular emphasis on this being a family-centered process. Even in a medical setting, it is important to bring intimacy and family-centeredness into this process, as this promotes connectedness and inclusiveness in what can be seen as a hostile and discriminatory environment. LGBTQ couples or individuals typically have to navigate more complexities and barriers than heterosexual couples when undergoing fertility treatment, such as stigma and carrier decisions, so allowing room for intimacy and connectedness in the process can improve the experience for individuals, reduce stress, and minimize barriers that target marginalized individuals.

Lesbian couples may either select a friend or family member as their sperm donor or choose an anonymous donor. After a sperm donor is selected, a couple can proceed with donor sperm IUI. IUI is an economic option for same-sex couples and can be done without the use of medication. According to a study from 2021, lesbian women undergoing IUI had an average clinical pregnancy rate of 13.2% per cycle and 42.2% success rate giving the average number of cycles at 3.6.

== Other animals ==
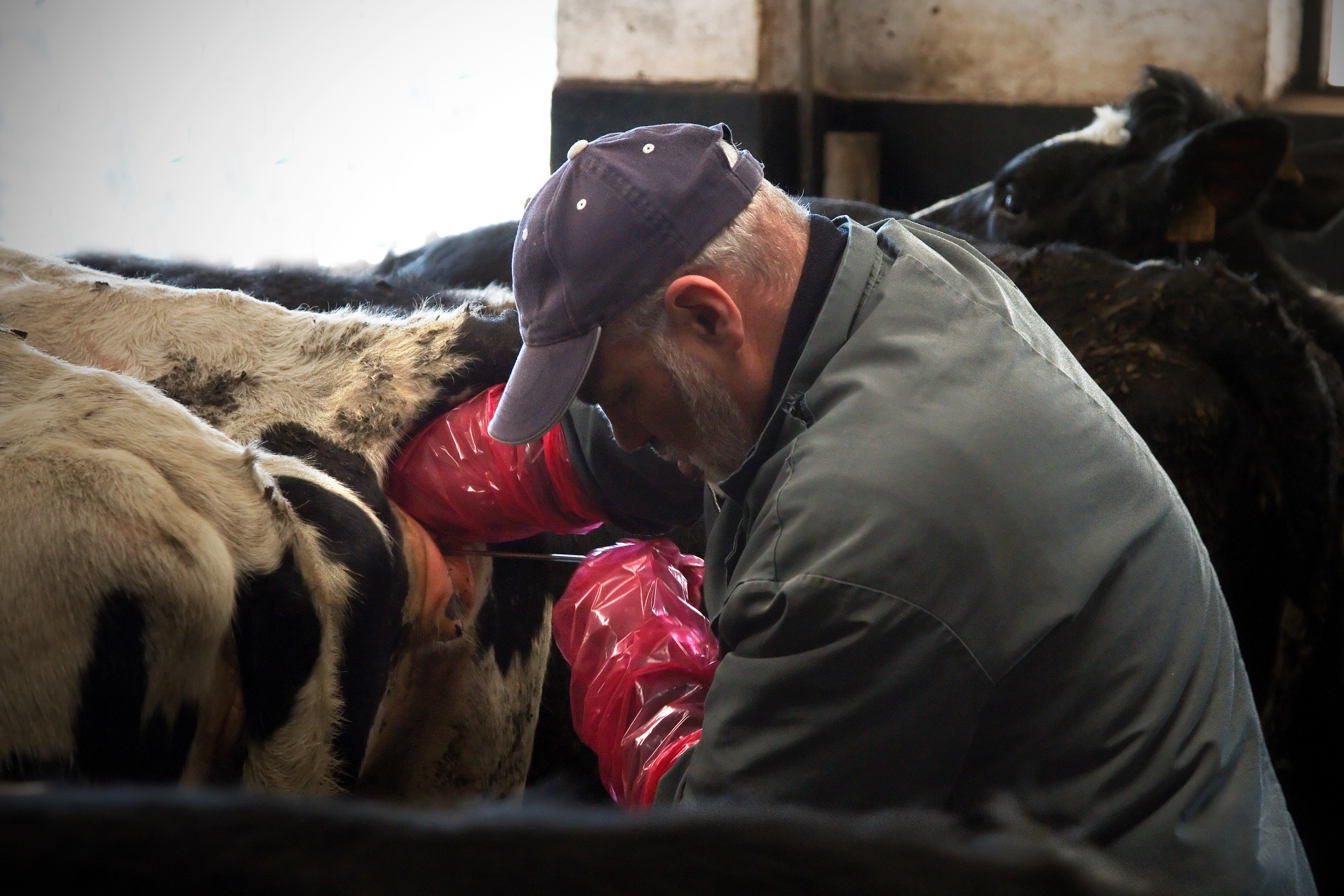
A man performing artificial insemination of a cow.

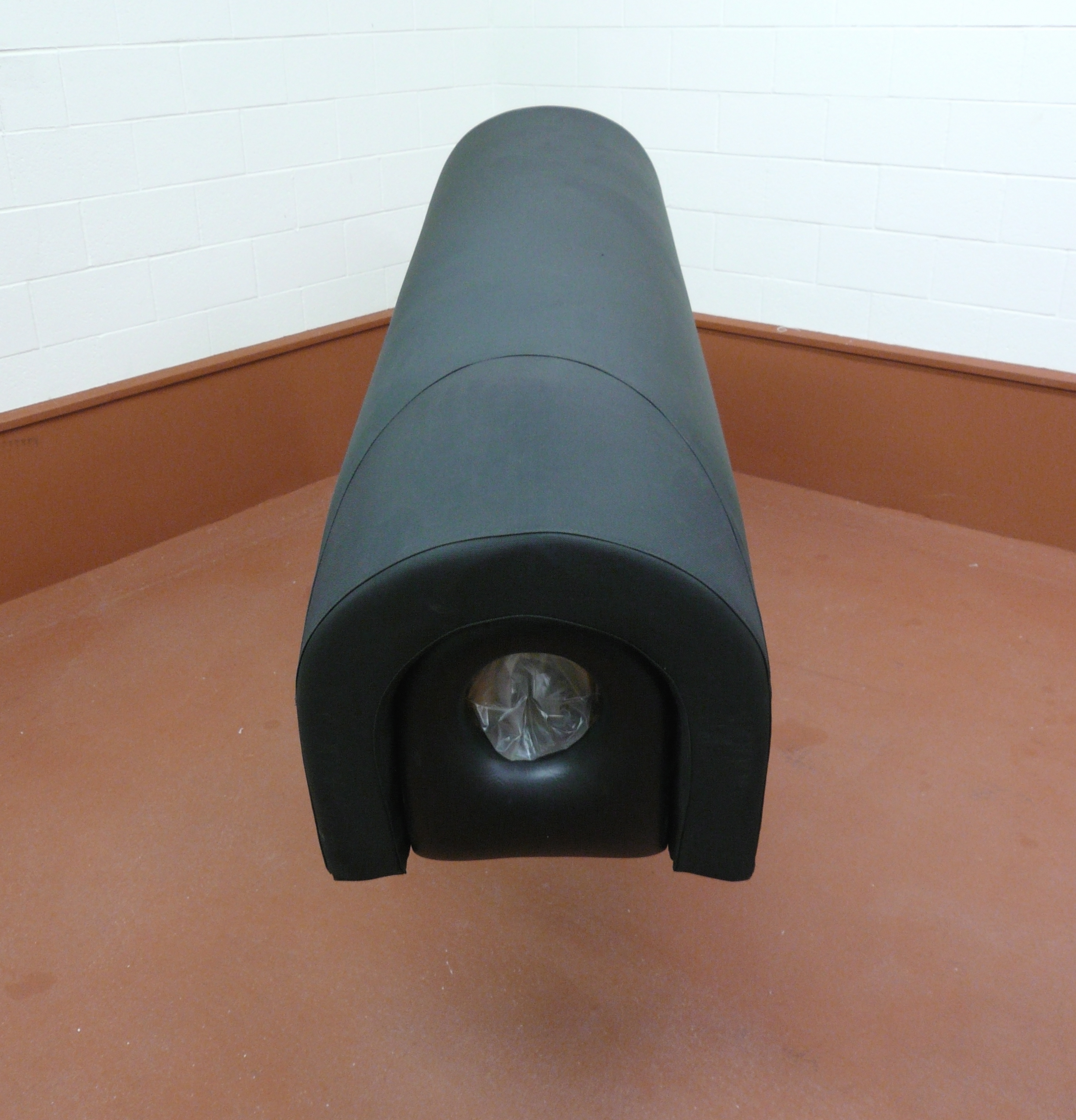
A breeding mount with built-in artificial vagina used in semen collection from horses for use in artificial insemination

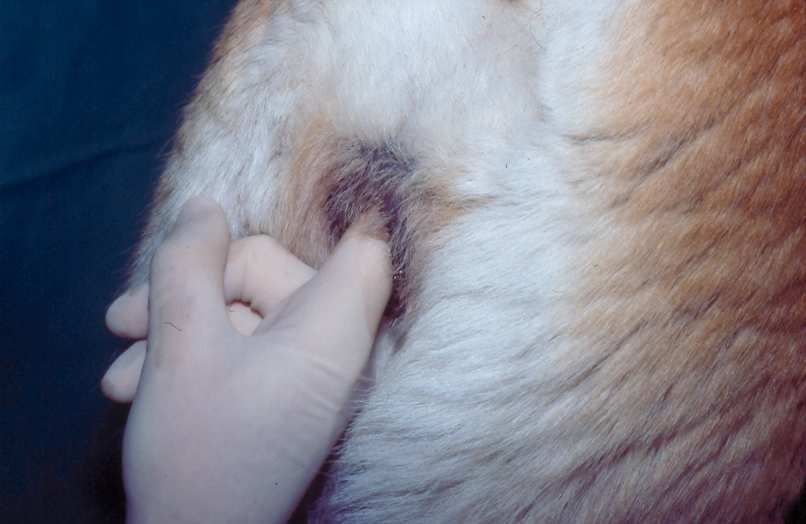
A breeder performing artificial insemination of a dog.

Artificial insemination is used for pets, livestock, endangered species, and animals in zoos or marine parks difficult to transport.

=== Reasons and techniques ===
It may be used for many reasons, including to allow a male to inseminate a much larger number of females, to allow the use of genetic material from males separated by distance or time, to overcome physical breeding difficulties, to control the paternity of offspring, to synchronize births, to avoid injury incurred during natural mating, and to avoid the need to keep a male at all (such as for small numbers of females or in species whose fertile males may be difficult to manage).

Artificial insemination is much more common than natural mating, as it allows several female animals to be impregnated from a single male. For instance, up to 30-40 female pigs can be impregnated from a single boar. Workers collect the semen by masturbating the boars, then insert it into the sows via a raised catheter known as a pork stork. Boars are still physically used to excite the females prior to insemination, but are prevented from actually mating.

Semen is collected, extended, then cooled or frozen. It can be used on-site or shipped to the female's location. If frozen, the small plastic tube holding the semen is referred to as a straw. To allow the sperm to remain viable during the time before and after it is frozen, the semen is mixed with a solution containing glycerol or other cryoprotectants. An extender is a solution that allows the semen from a donor to impregnate more females by making insemination possible with fewer sperm. Antibiotics, such as streptomycin, are sometimes added to the sperm to control some bacterial venereal diseases. Before the actual insemination, estrus may be induced through the use of progestogen and another hormone (usually PMSG or Prostaglandin F2α).

=== History ===
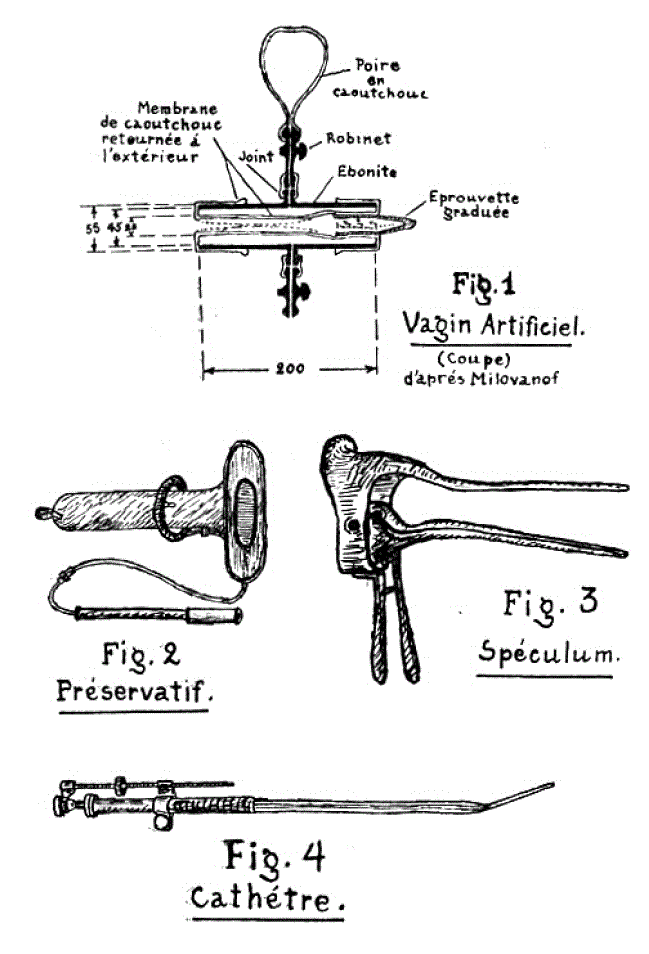
Artificial insemination tools brought from the USSR by Luis Thomasset in 1935 to work at Cambridge Laboratories and South America.

The first viviparous animal to be artificially fertilized was a dog. The experiment was conducted with success by the Italian Lazzaro Spallanzani in 1780. Another pioneer was the Russian Ilya Ivanov in 1899. In 1935, diluted semen from Suffolk sheep was flown from Cambridge in Britain to Kraków, Poland, as part of an international research project. The participants included Prawochenki (Poland), Milovanoff (USSR), Hammond and Walton (UK), and Thomasset (Uruguay).

Modern artificial insemination was pioneered by John O. Almquist of Pennsylvania State University. He improved breeding efficiency by the use of antibiotics (first proven with penicillin in 1946) to control bacterial growth, decreasing embryonic mortality, and increase fertility. This, and various new techniques for processing, freezing, and thawing of frozen semen significantly enhanced the practical utilization of artificial insemination in the livestock industry and earned him the 1981 Wolf Foundation Prize in Agriculture. Many techniques developed by him have since been applied to other species, including humans.

=== Species ===
Artificial insemination is used in many non-human animals, including sheep, horses, cattle, pigs, dogs, pedigree animals generally, zoo animals, turkeys and creatures as tiny as honeybees and as massive as orcas (killer whales).

Artificial insemination of farm animals is common in the developed world, especially for breeding dairy cattle (75% of all inseminations). Swine are also bred using this method (up to 85% of all inseminations).

Although common with cattle and swine, artificial insemination is not as widely practiced in the breeding of horses. A small number of equine associations in North America accept only horses that have been conceived by "natural cover" or "natural service" – the actual physical mating of a mare to a stallion – the Jockey Club being the most notable of these, as no artificial insemination is allowed in Thoroughbred breeding. Other registries such as the AQHA and warmblood registries allow registration of foals created through artificial insemination, and the process is widely used allowing the breeding of mares to stallions not resident at the same facility – or even in the same country – through the use of transported frozen or cooled semen.

In modern species conservation, semen collection and artificial insemination are used also in birds. In 2013 scientist of the Justus-Liebig-University of Giessen, Germany, from the working group of Michael Lierz, Clinic for birds, reptiles, amphibians, and fish, developed a novel technique for semen collection and artificial insemination in parrots producing the world's first macaw by assisted reproduction.

Scientists working with captive orcas were able to pioneer the technique in the early 2000s, resulting in "the first successful conceptions, resulting in live offspring, using artificial insemination in any cetacean species". John Hargrove, a SeaWorld trainer, describes Kasatka as being the first orca to receive artificial insemination.

=== Violation of rights ===
Artificial insemination on animals has been criticised as a violation of animal rights, with animal rights advocates equating it with rape and arguing it constitutes institutionalized bestiality. Artificial insemination of farm animals is condemned by animal rights campaigners such as People for the Ethical Treatment of Animals (PETA) and Joey Carbstrong, who identify the practice as a form of rape due to its sexual, involuntary and perceived painful nature. Animal rights organizations such as PETA and Mercy for Animals frequently write against the practice in their articles. Much of the meat production in the United States depends on artificial insemination, resulting in an explosive growth of the procedure over the past three decades.

== Criteria for benefiting from artificial insemination according to the 2021 Bioethics Law of France ==
According to the 2021 Bioethics Law of France, the criteria that must be met to benefit from artificial insemination are as follows:

1. Artificial insemination can be performed using sperm from the husband or frozen sperm from an anonymous donor.
2. Both spouses or the unmarried woman must consent in advance to artificial insemination or embryo transfer.
3. The parenting project must be validated through a series of interviews with professionals (doctors, psychologists, etc.).
4. Individuals benefiting from artificial insemination must be of reproductive age.

The 2021 Bioethics Law has expanded the scope of Medically Assisted Procreation (MAP).

== See also ==
- Accidental incest
- Conception device
- Donor conceived people
- Embryo transfer
- Ex-situ conservation
- Frozen bovine semen
- Frozen zoo
- Intracytoplasmic sperm injection
- Semen extender
- Sperm bank
- Sperm donation
- Sperm sorting
- Surrogacy
