= Moral theology of John XXIII =

Beliefs and views of Pope John XXIII

Pope John XXIII held traditional views on the issues of moral theology and was highly critical of abortion, contraception, artificial insemination, divorce and the ordination of homosexual seminarians.

== Contraception ==
In 1963, Pope John XXIII established a commission of six European non-theologians to study questions of birth control and population. Neither John XXIII nor Paul VI wanted the almost three thousand bishops and other clerics then in Rome for Vatican II to address the birth control issue even though many of these bishops expressed their desire to bring this pressing pastoral issue before the Council.

The disagreements within the commission ultimately led to the publication of the encyclical Humanae Vitae.

== Human Rights ==
Pope John XXIII was a strong advocate for human rights including those of the unborn and the elderly. He wrote most passionately about human rights in his final encyclical, Pacem in Terris, issued in 1963 only a few months before his death. In it he wrote, "Man has the right to live. He has the right to bodily integrity and to the means necessary for the proper development of life, particularly food, clothing, shelter, medical care, rest, and, finally, the necessary social services. In consequence, he has the right to be looked after in the event of ill health; disability stemming from his work; widowhood; old age; enforced unemployment; or whenever through no fault of his own he is deprived of the means of livelihood."

== Divorce ==
Regarding divorce, he said that “We must solemnly proclaim that human life is transmitted by means of the family, the family founded on marriage, one and indissoluble, raised for Christians to the dignity of a Sacrament.”

== Ordination of gay seminarians ==
A 1961 document approved by Pope John was entitled "Careful Selection And Training Of Candidates For The States Of Perfection And Sacred Orders". It stated that homosexual men should not be ordained, although this was left to bishops to enforce, and most did not, holding homosexuals to the same standards of celibate chastity as heterosexual seminarians.

== Clerical abuse affairs ==
The document known as Crimen sollicitationis was issued by the Holy Office on March 16, 1962 and was presented by Cardinal Alfredo Ottaviani to Pope John XXIII for his approval.

== Artificial insemination ==
He also stated that “the transmission of human life is entrusted by nature to a personal and conscious act, and, as such, subject to the all-wise laws of God: laws inviolable and immutable that are to be recognized and observed. Therefore, it is not permissible to use means and follow methods that can be licit for the transmission of plant or animal life.”

== See also ==
- Catholic moral theology
