= California Cryobank =

- Type: Private
- Industry: Reproductive tissue banking
- Founded: 1977
- Headquarters: Los Angeles, California, U.S.
- Services: Donor sperm; reproductive tissue storage; cryogenic preservation
- Parent: CooperSurgical
- Website: www.cryobank.com

California Cryobank is a sperm bank in California, United States, one of the two biggest in the world. There are offices in Palo Alto, Los Angeles, Cambridge, Massachusetts, and New York. According to the company in 2018, they had about 600 donors and 75,000 registered live births since 1977.

Since 2018, they no longer accept anonymous donations. They offer a service to choose sperm from donors who resemble celebrities. When they reach the age of 18 children conceived through sperm donation can ask for information about their biological fathers.

The sperm bank also offers sperm of donors who have deceased, and co-founder Cappy Rothman was the first physician who extracted sperm post mortem. In 2016, it was estimated that there had been 200 such cases.
