= Donor Sibling Registry =

- Company type: 501(c)(3) nonprofit
- Industry: Charity
- Founded: September 2000
- Headquarters: Nederland, Colorado, USA
- Key people: Wendy Kramer, director and co-founder Ryan Kramer, co-founder
- Revenue: ▲$288,616 USD (2018)

The Donor Sibling Registry is a website and non-profit US organization serving donor offspring, sperm donors, egg donors and other donor conceived people. It was founded in September 2000 by a mother-and-son team, Wendy Kramer and Ryan Kramer of Nederland, Colorado.

== Purpose and goals ==
The Donor Sibling Registry (DSR) was founded in 2000 to assist individuals conceived as a result of sperm, egg or embryo donation, such as through a sperm bank, who are seeking to make mutually desired contact with others with whom they share genetic ties. The DSR has pioneered an international discussion about the donor conception industry and the families, with its research, media appearances, speaking engagements, and interviews. The DSR advocates for the right to honesty and transparency for donor-conceived people, for social acceptance and legal rights, and values the diversity of all families.

== History ==
The DSR began as a Yahoo! group, which was created in September 2000. It was started by Wendy Kramer and her 10-year-old son Ryan Kramer, who was conceived via an anonymous sperm donor, as a means of communicating with half siblings who were conceived from the same donor. After the first year, the group was home to only 37 members. In October 2002, Wendy created a press release which was sent to local news agencies. The story was picked up by Denver's NBC affiliate, KUSA-TV. Shortly after, a small article about the DSR was written for The Denver Post. This article led to national and international media coverage, giving the DSR enough exposure to grow its member base into the thousands. In 2003 the DSR became a 501(c)3 charity organization and moved from a Yahoo group to its own database website.

== Research ==
The DSR has published dozens of papers in peer-reviewed academic and legal journals.

== Books and booklets ==
- DNA = Donors Not Anonymous
- Finding Our Families: A First-of-Its-Kind Book for Donor-conceived People and Their Families
- Your Family: A Donor Kid's Story

== Matches ==
When a donor-conceived person, a parent of a donor-conceived person or a sperm or egg donor signs up to the Donor Sibling Registry, they are automatically filed under their respective facility/clinic/cryobank by their donor number. Matches and messages from potential matches can only be viewed for an annual membership fee. If only one person of a donor number is listed, the posting is white. When two or more people sign up under the same donor number, they are filed together as a "match". Matches can occur between half siblings (light yellow), sperm donors and their offspring (dark yellow), or egg donors and their offspring (also dark yellow).

Due to changes in technology and the introduction of the commercially available home DNA tests, the ability of Donor Sibling Registry to be an effective use of resources may be outdated.

== See also ==
- Dibling
