= Donor-conceived person =

Person who was conceived with a donor egg, sperm, or embryo

A donor offspring, or donor-conceived person (DCP), is conceived via the donation of sperm (sperm donation) or ova (egg donation), or both (either from two separate donors or from a couple).

For donor-conceived people, the biological parent(s) who donated sperm or eggs are not legally recognized as parents and do not appear on their birth certificates. In many countries, it is common for donor-conceived people to be given no identifying information about their donors; however, in some countries, anonymous sperm or egg donation has been made illegal due to concerns for the medical and emotional needs of donor-conceived people. Even in cases with anonymous donors, donor-conceived people are sometimes able to connect with biological parent(s) or half-siblings conceived from the same donor using DNA testing or through online registries for donor-conceived people.

With the significant increase in the numbers of donor-conceived individuals (38,910 live babies were born in 2005 as a result of 134,260 assisted reproductive technology (ART) cycles performed at reporting U.S. clinics in 2005, compared with 20,659 babies born as a result of 64,036 ART cycles in 1996), many have questioned the ethics surrounding the technologies and human decisions surrounding donor conception, and there has been plenty of controversy. For example, the term "snowflake baby" was coined in reference to unused frozen embryos (left over from other couples' attempts to conceive through in-vitro fertilization (IVF)) that have been "adopted" by families. Abortion opponents tend to support such adoptions.

"ART cycles" are not accurate, as many people (<40%) who use egg donation for IVF do not report their births, and there is no tracking or record-keeping required for children born from sperm donation. Estimates of 30,000–60,000 often used are from estimates made with incomplete records from the mid-1980s.

== Psychological and social ==
The psychological and social impacts of assisted reproductive technologies (ART) on donor-conceived children and their families has gained a great deal of interest in recent years as this population has continued to grow. An increasing number of family-support organizations strongly encourage parents to openly discuss their children's origins, whether through donor insemination or following treatment with donated gametes, because research suggests that donor-conceived people who learn the nature of their conception at a young age do not suffer psychologically as much as those who learn about their conception at a later age, where they may feel lied to or betrayed. In addition, a person not knowing that they are donor conceived will cause them to provide inaccurate medical histories. They might also accidentally have incestous relationships with half-siblings.

For most Swedish sperm recipients, the choice between anonymous sperm donor and a non-anonymous one is generally not of major importance. For some donor conceived children, on the other hand, it may be psychologically burdensome not having the possibility of contacting or knowing almost nothing about the donor. Studies have found that a significant number of donor conceived children want information about their donor.

== Donor and sibling tracking ==
There are donor sibling registries matching genetic siblings and donors. However, with modern information technology, there are other ways of getting information.

One study estimated that approximately 67% of donor-conceived children in adolescence with an identity-release donor plan on contacting him when they are eighteen years old.

=== Registries ===
Donor registration facilitates donor-conceived people, sperm donors, and egg donors establishing contact with genetic relatives. They are mostly used by donor-conceived people to find genetic half-siblings from the same egg or sperm donor.

Some donors are non-anonymous, but most are anonymous; that is, most donor-conceived people do not know the identities of their donors. Still, they may be able to obtain unique donor numbers or known donor characteristics, such as hair, eye, and skin colors, from fertility clinics to find matched genetic half-siblings.

The largest donor registry is the Donor Sibling Registry (DSR); however, there are also many other registries and sometimes registries for siblings set up by the clinics themselves.

=== Clinics or sperm banks ===
Clinics and sperm banks facilitate the transaction that allows for prospective parents to become pregnant with donated gametes. They recruit and screen donors and advertise their products to prospective parents. Their position as a middleman is what makes anonymous sperm donation possible, though many clinics and sperm banks also offer non-anonymous donors, where donor-conceived people may get the identities of their donors. The most common type of non-anonymous donor is an identity-release donor, which allows offspring to receive identifying information (such as name, phone number, and/or email address) upon their 18th birthdays, but there are also donors who share identifying information from the beginning. Identity-release donors can have some issues, as the donor's contact information may change between the donation and the child's 18th birthday, or the donor may pass away.

Many people fear that if anonymous donation is made illegal, then the number of donors will decrease and there will not be enough supply. However, an Australian study concluded that potential donors who would still be willing to donate without a guarantee of anonymity were not automatically more open to contact with offspring. Most potential donors would be willing to meet offspring in a single contact. In addition, after anonymous donation was banned in the UK, donations actually increased.

=== DNA testing ===
Due to the advent of genetic genealogy and DNA databases, even sperm donors who have not initiated contact through a registry are now increasingly being traced by their offspring. In the current era, there can be no such thing as guaranteed anonymity, as it is now possible for "anonymous" sperm donors to be identified by their offspring. Possibly the first such case was in 2005, when it was revealed in New Scientist magazine that a fifteen-year-old had used information from a DNA test and the Internet to identify and contact his sperm donor.

In 2018, it was reported that DNA testing has led to a significant increase in donor-conceived people finding their siblings and sperm donors.

=== Controversy ===
Within groups of donor-conceived people, there is controversy regarding the practice of donor conception and anonymity. Some donor-conceived people feel frustrated with the circumstances of their conception, particularly if they were conceived anonymously, because they wish to learn more about their biological family but they find themselves without the means to do so. They may feel that their parents, who often chose donor conception over adoption because of desire for a biological connection, are hypocritical in choosing an anonymous donor and preventing them from connecting to biological relatives. On the other hand, some primarily feel grateful that donor conception allowed for their existence and are less interested in the biological family. And yet others feel neutral or do not consider it much. Overall, however, most donor-conceived people are at least somewhat interested in their biological family and believe that the fertility industry needs greater regulation.

== See also ==
- Egg donor
- Sperm donation
- Accidental incest
- Dibling
