= Ann Kiessling =

American reproductive biologist (born 1942)

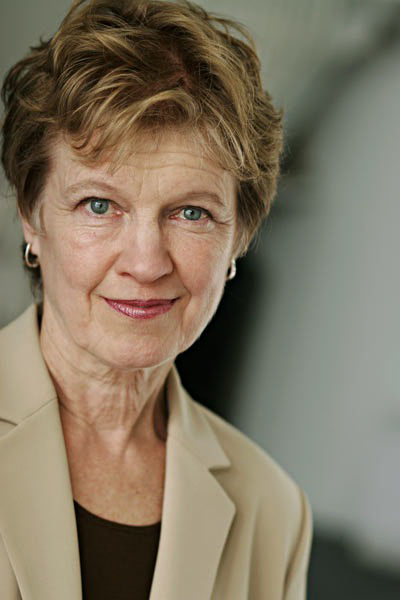
- Born: Ann Anderson; March 29, 1942 (age 84); Baker City, Oregon, U.S.
- Education: U. of Virginia (BSc.); Central Washington U. (BSc., MS); Oregon State University (Ph.D.); UCSD (Postdoc.)
- Occupation: Stem cell researcher
- Known for: Discovery of reverse transcriptase activity in normal human cells, founder of the Special Program of Assisted Reproduction, director of the Bedford Stem Cell Research Foundation

Ann Kiessling (née Anderson; born March 29, 1942) is an American reproductive biologist and a researcher in human parthenogenic stem cell research at The Bedford Research Foundation. She was an associate professor in teaching hospitals of Harvard Medical School (Brigham and Women's Hospital, Faulkner Hospital, New England Deaconess, and Beth Israel Deaconess Medical Center) from 1985 until 2012.

== Background ==
Kiessling was born Ann Anderson in Baker City, Oregon. Her father, William Charles Anderson, was a squadron commander in the US Air Force during World War II. She graduated in 1960 from Klamath Falls High School and attended Georgetown University from 1960 to 1962, then attended the University of Virginia from 1992 to 1964 where she received the first of her two bachelor's degrees in nursing. In 1966, she received her second bachelor's degree, in chemistry, from Central Washington University where the following year she also received her master's degree in organic chemistry. In 1971, she earned her Ph.D. from Oregon State University in biochemistry and biophysics. She did postdoctoral research at Fred Hutchinson Cancer Research Center, Memorial Sloan-Kettering Cancer Center, and University of California, San Diego. Kiessling has four children, 3 daughters and a son.

== Career ==
Kiessling is noted for her discovery of reverse transcriptase activity in normal human cells. This report pioneered the importance of naturally occurring retrovirus sequences in human genes, now thought to be important to the genetic plasticity involved in human evolution and biology. Prior to this discovery, it had been assumed that reverse transcriptase was an enzyme found only in retroviruses (such as human immunodeficiency virus). To understand the normal biologic role of reverse transcriptase, Kiessling began to study eggs and early cleaving embryos. Her dual interests in virology and reproductive biology led to research in semen transmission of human immunodeficiency virus, and the creation of the first laboratory for human in vitro fertilization in Oregon in the early 1980s. Harvard Medical School recruited Kiessling in 1985, and she conducted research there until 2011. Kiessling conducts research at the Bedford Stem Cell Research Foundation.

The need to conduct biomedical research in areas not funded by the federal government led to the incorporation of the Bedford Stem Cell Research Foundation. The techniques developed for the Special Program of Assisted Reproduction have been extended to other diseases of the male genitourinary tract, such as prostatitis and bladder infections. Expertise in human egg biology led Kiessling to develop the country's first human egg donor program for stem cell research in 2000. It remains a research focus today. Kiessling's team was the first to establish the importance of circadian rhythms to early egg development.Because of Kiessling's Special Program of Assisted Reproduction, 101 healthy babies have been fathered by HIV positive men as of October 2009.

Among the publications by Kiessling is the first comprehensive look at the influence of accurate science terminology on laws titled, "What is an Embryo," published by the Connecticut Law Review along with rejoinders by Harold Shapiro, Prof John A. Robertson, Prof. Lars Noah, and Father Kevin P. Quinn. The law review addresses the controversy of all of the entities that are currently called embryos with regards to embryonic stem cell research legislation around the world. In 2003, Kiessling wrote Human Embryonic Stem Cells: An Introduction to the Science and Therapeutic Potential, the first textbook on the controversial topic.

Kiessling is a member of the California (California Constitution Article XXXV) and Connecticut Stem Cell Research Advisory Boards, and a member of the Embryonic Stem Cell Research Oversight Committees for Harvard University, Joslin Diabetes Center and Children's Hospital. Kiessling has been cited in articles in The Boston Globe, The Wall Street Journal, Los Angeles Times, The New York Times, and NPR among others.

== SARS2 (Coronavirus) ==
In March 2020, Kiessling expanded her laboratory operations at the Bedford Research Foundation to include SARS-CoV-2 (COVID-19) testing. On April 17, 2020, Kiessling reported that one of her daughters, a front-line worker at a local hospital, had tested positive for Coronavirus. Kiessling's frustration over the continued lack of available testing led her to expand the Foundation's SARS-CoV-2 testing efforts to offer public testing.

== Awards ==
- 2007 – Kiessling's Special Program of Assisted Reproduction was presented with the Technology Prize Paper Award by The American Society for Reproductive Medicine.
- 2009 – Kiessling received the Jacob Heskel Gabbay Award for Biotechnology and Medicine.
- 2010 – Central Washington University Distinguished Alumni Award,
- 2011 – First ever University of Virginia, school of nursing, Alumni Achievement Award.
- 2014 – Honorary Doctorate and Lifetime Achievement Award from Jodhpur School of Public Health, Mumbai, India, presented at the 2014 HIV Congress in Mumbai.
- 2014 – Oregon State University Commencement Address
- 2014 – Honorary Doctorate in Cell and Molecular Biology, Oregon State University

== Selected publications ==
- Loutradis D, John D, Kiessling AA (September 1987). "Hypoxanthine causes a 2-cell block in random-bred mouse embryos". Biology of Reproduction. 37 (2): 311–6. doi:10.1095/biolreprod37.2.311. PMID 3676390.
- Goldman DS, Kiessling AA, Millette CF, Cooper GM (July 1987). "Expression of c-mos RNA in germ cells of male and female mice". Proceedings of the National Academy of Sciences of the United States of America. 84 (13): 4509–13. Bibcode:1987PNAS...84.4509G. doi:10.1073/pnas.84.13.4509. PMC 305119. PMID 2955407.
- Borzy MS, Connell RS, Kiessling AA (1988). "Detection of human immunodeficiency virus in cell-free seminal fluid". Journal of Acquired Immune Deficiency Syndromes. 1 (5): 419–24. PMID 2464685.
- O'Keefe SJ, Wolfes H, Kiessling AA, Cooper GM (September 1989). "Microinjection of antisense c-mos oligonucleotides prevents meiosis II in the maturing mouse egg". Proceedings of the National Academy of Sciences of the United States of America. 86 (18): 7038–42. Bibcode:1989PNAS...86.7038O. doi:10.1073/pnas.86.18.7038. PMC 297988. PMID 2476810.
- Kiessling, Ann A.; Anderson, Scott (2003). Human Embryonic Stem Cells: An Introduction to the Science and Therapeutic Potential. Burlington, MA: Jones and Bartlett Publishers, Inc. ISBN 978-0763723415.
- Kiessling AA (2004). "What is an embryo?". Connecticut Law Review. 36 (4): 1051–92. PMID 15868674.
- Ann Kiessling; Ritsa Bletsa; Bryan Desmarais; Christina Mara; Kostas Kallianidis; Dimitris Loutradis (2009). "Evidence that human blastomere cleavage is under unique cell cycle control". Journal of Assisted Reproduction and Genetics. 26 (4): 187–195. doi:10.1007/s10815-009-9306-x. PMC 2682187. PMID 19288185.
