= Dibling =

Portmanteau of donor sibling

A dibling, a portmanteau of donor sibling, or donor-conceived sibling, or donor-sperm sibling, is one of two or more individuals who are biologically connected through donated eggs or sperm. This term is also commonly used in children biologically related through embryo donation. In this instance, the children are full not half biological siblings. The term is not favored among some recipient parents, who prefer the use of half-sibling.

People born from anonymous or ID release sperm or egg donation are able to find half-siblings conceived using the same gamete donor online through the Donor Sibling Registry or by using commercially available DNA test kits. DNA testing is more accurate because it relies on comparison of single-nucleotide polymorphisms instead of gamete donor identification numbers (which may contain errors).
