= Semen extender =

Liquid diluent used as a preservative

Semen extender is a liquid diluent which is added to semen to preserve its fertilizing ability. It acts as a buffer to protect sperm cells from their own toxic byproducts, as well as protecting the sperm from cold shock and osmotic shock during the chilling and shipping process (the semen is chilled to reduce metabolism). The extender allows the semen to be shipped to the female, rather than requiring the male and female to be near to each other. Special freezing extender use also allows cryogenic preservation of sperm, which may be transported for use, or used on-site at a later date.

Semen extenders should not be confused with drugs or nutritional supplements designed to increase the volume of semen released during an ejaculation. The efficacy and utility of volume increasers is dubious.

== Function ==
The addition of extender to semen protects the sperm cells against possible damage by toxic seminal plasma, as well as providing nutrients and cooling buffers if the semen is to be cooled. Semen extender also serves to protect sperm from bacteria by adding antibiotics to it to prevent increase of bacteria. In the case of freezing extenders, one or more penetrating cryoprotectants will be added. Typical cryoprotectants include glycerol, DMSO and dimethylformamide. Egg yolk, which has cryoprotective properties, is also a common component.

== Ingredients ==
In the equine Kenney extender (named after its developer, Dr. Robert M. Kenney) has been used for many years, and contains a non-fat dried milk solid (NFDMS) and glucose. Dual-sugar extenders typically have similar ingredients, with an additional sugar, sucrose. Other extenders (e.g., INRA '96) may also contain milk components.

Antibiotics are almost universal in semen extenders, especially those being used for shipping or freezing semen. Ticarcillin (often used in combination with clavulanic acid under the designation Timentin), amikacin sulfate, penicillin, and gentamicin are commonly used. The latter - gentamicin - has been noted to reduce sperm motility in the equine. In human semen extenders, antibiotics are required for regulatory reasons, so their use is almost universal in clinics, even though antibiotics can be detrimental to sperm. This is because in procedures such as IVF with frozen sperm, the sperm does not need to swim up the reproductive tract on their own, and the detrimental effects of the antibiotics are not problematic. When private donors ship chilled semen outside of the formal regulatory environment, and fertilization is accomplished by allowing sperm to swim through the reproductive tract without the help of procedures such as IVF, then it is possible to achieve better results without antibiotics.

== Brands ==
=== Porcine ===
- Androhep Plus
- Androstar Plus
- Androstar Premium
- Merck III
- BTS
- MR-A
- Beltsville Liquid (BL-1)
- Acromax
- Beltsville Thawing Solution (BTS)
- Illinois Variable Temperature (IVT)
- Kiev
- MULBERRY III
- Reading
- X-Cell
- Zorlesco
- ZORPVA
- MS Dilufert, various generations (3, 6, 9, 10)
- Preserv Xtra

=== Bovine ===
- Andromed
- Andromed CSS
- Bioxcell
- CRYOBOS
- Triladyl
- Biladyl
- Steridyl
- Biociphos
- Bovifree

=== Equine ===
- AndroMed-E
- Kenney (often marketed under a brand name - e.g. E-Z Mixin')
- VMDZ
- BotuCrio (Botupharma)
- INRA '96
- Universal dual-sugar
- Gent Extenders
- Equipro
- Spervital extenders (http://www.spervital.nl)
- EQUIDIL (EMBRYOLAB-UFSM)
- SBS semen extenders

=== Human ===
- Test Yolk Buffer (TYB) by Irvine
