= Fertility clinic =

Medical clinic for fertility treatment

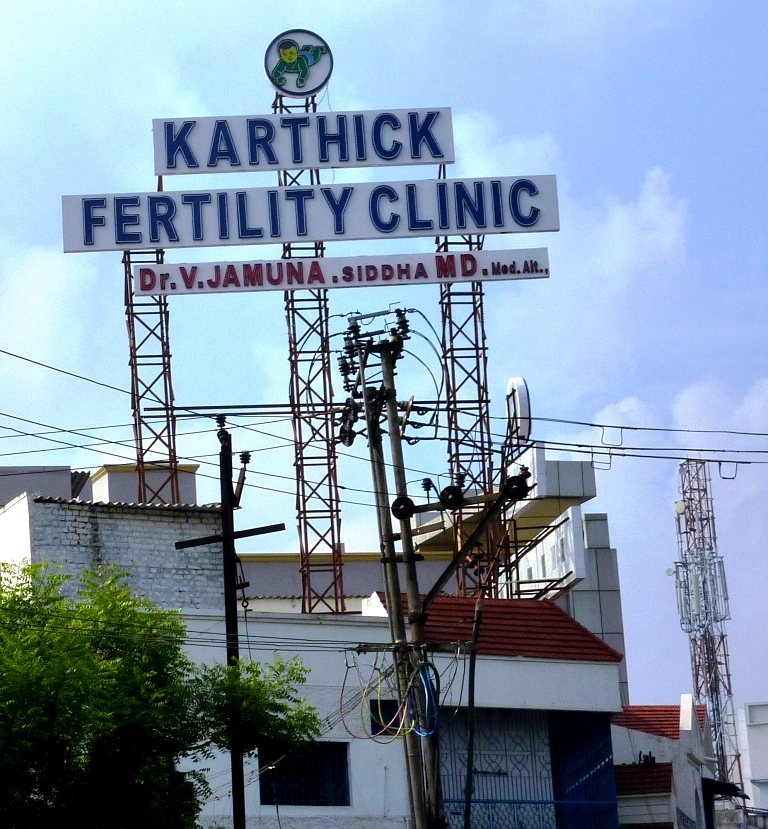
Fertility Clinic near Chennai, India

Fertility clinics are medical clinics that assist couples, and sometimes individuals, who want to become parents but for medical reasons have been unable to achieve this goal via the natural course. Clinics apply a number of diagnosis tests and sometimes very advanced medical treatments to achieve conceptions and pregnancies.

== Clinic staff ==
Fertility clinics are staffed with trained personnel including reproductive endocrinologists, embryologists, sonographers, nurses, lab technicians and administrative staff.

== Diagnosis ==
Fertility clinics look to both males and females for diagnosis of fertility problems. Diagnosis has shown that fertility problems arise 35% of the time from males, 35% from female, 20% from combined issues, and 10% from unexplained causes. For the male, semen collection is a standard diagnostic test to ascertain problems with the semen quality, while females may undergo a number of tests including an ovulation analysis, x-ray of fallopian tubes and uterus, and laparoscopy.

== Treatment ==
Treatment may include ovulation induction, surgical interventions, artificial insemination, such as intrauterine insemination (IUI), in vitro fertilization (IVF), or the use of an egg donor or a sperm donor.

== Comparing clinics ==
The Centers for Disease Control requires outcome data be reported to the Society of Assisted Reproductive Technology (SART) which is the organization that compiles statistics.

== In fiction ==
Medical dramas set in a fertility clinic include Inconceivable, which ran for two episodes in 2005 before being cancelled, and The Family Man, a British series in three parts. Furthermore, Private Practice is set in a clinic that offers fertility services to a large extent. The Gilmore Girls character Paris Geller was revealed to be running a fertility clinic of her own in the revival series Gilmore Girls: A Year in the Life.

== See also ==
- Sperm bank
- Surrogacy
- Third party reproduction
- Embryo donation
- Reproductive medicine
- Intracytoplasmic Sperm Injection (ICSI)
