= Sperm donation laws by country =

Sperm donation laws vary by country. Most countries have laws to cover sperm donations which, for example, place limits on how many children a sperm donor may give rise to, or which limit or prohibit the use of donor semen after the donor has died, or payment to sperm donors. Other laws may restrict use of donor sperm for in vitro fertilisation (IVF) treatment, which may itself be banned or restricted in some way, such as to married heterosexual couples, banning such treatment to single women or lesbian couples. Donated sperm may be used for insemination (whether natural or artificial) or as part of IVF treatment. Notwithstanding such laws, informal and private sperm donations take place, which are largely unregulated.

Restrictions on sperm donations or the ability to obtain IVF treatment in some jurisdictions has given rise to women traveling to a country which does not impose restrictions in the circumstances in which they finds themselves to obtain such donations or treatments, in a practice called fertility tourism.

== Regulation of sperm donations ==
=== Number of donations ===
Most jurisdictions limit the number of children a sperm donor may give rise to. The main reason to limit sperm donations is the risk of accidental consanguinity or inbreeding between donor offspring.

=== Recipients ===
Many countries have restrictions on who can be a recipient of donated sperm. Some countries restrict donations to married heterosexual couples (e.g., Japan), and some to married heterosexual or homosexual couples, while others permit donations to married couples or those in cohabitation relationships. In some jurisdictions such as France, single women and lesbian couples have only been able to receive treatments using donor sperm since 2021.

=== Rights of donor ===
The rights of the sperm donor also vary. These involve rights to compensation, anonymity, parental rights, child support obligations, besides other issues.

== Overview ==
Sperm donation is illegal in many predominantly Muslim countries, as sperm donation is prohibited under Islamic law because it is considered a form of adultery. Such countries include Afghanistan, Egypt, Pakistan, Saudi Arabia, Turkey, and the United Arab Emirates.

Country	Donor payment	Children per donor	Donor anonymity	Allowed recipients
Australia	No	Australian Capital Territory: No data; New South Wales: 5 families; Northern Territory: No data; Queensland: No data; South Australia: 10 families; Tasmania: No data; Victoria: 10 families; Western Australia: 5 families	No	Everyone
Austria	Varies	3 families	No	Married heterosexual or homosexual couples
Belgium	No data	6 families	Required (unless a family member is used)	No data
Bulgaria	Expenses	5 children	Yes	Everyone
Canada	No	No enforced national limit	Allowed	Everyone
China	Varies	5 families	Yes	Married heterosexual couples
Cyprus	Expenses	No data	Yes	Heterosexual couples and single women
Denmark	200–500 DKK	12 families	Allowed	Everyone
Finland	€32.40 per donation, roughly €324 total and expenses	5 families	Requires ID release at 18	Everyone
France	No	10 children	Requires ID release at 18	No data
Germany	Varies	No enforced national limit	Requires ID release at 18	Usually married heterosexual couples
Hong Kong	No data	3 children	No data	Married heterosexual couples with age restrictions
Iran	Varies	No enforced national limit	Yes	Married couples
Israel	Allowed	12 families	Required	Everyone
Italy	No	10 children	Yes	Married heterosexual couples
Greece		10 children		
Japan	No	No enforced national limit; guidelines recommend 10 births per donor	Yes	Legal Married heterosexual couples with age restrictions
Mexico	No	No enforced national limit	Required	Everyone
Netherlands	Expenses	12 families	No	Everyone
New Zealand	Expenses	5 families	No	Everyone
Norway	Expenses	6 families	No	Everyone
Portugal	€43.88 per donation	10 families	No, child may have name when 18 years old	Everyone
Spain	No data	6 children	Required	Everyone
Sweden	300 SEK	12 children to 6 families (2 per family)	No	Married or in cohabitation
Switzerland	Expenses	8 children	No	Married couples
Taiwan	8000-99000 NT	1 family	Yes	Married couples
Ukraine	Allowed	No enforced national limit	Required	Heterosexual couples and single women
United Kingdom	£35 to cover expenses	10 families in UK. Exports subject to national limits	No	Everyone
United States of America	Allowed	No enforced national limit. 25 families in Colorado. Exports allowed.	Allowed federally. Oregon and Colorado require ID release at 18.	Everyone

== By country ==
=== Australia ===
Laws relating to assisted reproduction vary between states. Since 1995, when a child becomes an adult, they can apply for the sperm donor's details. Sperm donors are not paid. Demand is high for donor sperm, and laws vary between states as to how many families a donor's sperm can be provided to. In Victoria, there is a limit of 10 families per donor. In Western Australia, the Human Reproductive Technology Act 1991 (HRT Act) limits the number of families for each donor to 5. New South Wales has a limit of 5 families per donor in the state.

High demand for donor sperm results in much of the sperm available in Australia being imported.

=== Belgium ===
There is no limit to the number of children born from each donor, however they can only donate to a maximum of six families.

=== Canada ===
There is no upper limit to the number of donor offspring in Canada, but sperm banks generally follow the same recommendations as in the US, i.e. a maximum of 25 offspring per population of 800,000.

The Assisted Human Reproduction Act banned compensation for sperm donors and imposed a bureaucratic system described as "cumbersome" on donors, after which time more than 90% of donor sperm used in Canada comes from the U.S. The federal government does not track the number of births by sperm or egg donation, and there is no registry.

=== Denmark ===
In Denmark, one donor may give rise to 12 children. Before the new limit was set a donor could help to conceive children in up to 25 families who could use the donor sperm for conceiving siblings even after the limit was reached.

However, Denmark also exports semen worldwide, and where it is the limit of the importing country that is followed, or, when there is no such limit, a fixed amount considering that country's total population, in order to minimise the risk of consanguinity.

Through the export it may result in that some single donors have up to 200 biological children worldwide who are genetic half-siblings.

=== France ===
In France, donations from a single donor may give rise to a maximum of 10 children. All new gamete donors must be open ID at 18. Donor conceived people may request information or get the donor name when they reach 18 years of age.

=== Germany ===
The German Legislation provides that a donor may not produce more than fifteen children through his donations.

=== Israel ===
In Israel, sperm donation is regulated by the Ministry of Health. There are 12 authorized sperm banks and hospitals across the country, and 2 more in private research facilities. Only unmarried, healthy men under the age of 30 are allowed to donate sperm, and they are financially compensated for it. Men who want to donate must get to the hospital, pass an interview and blood-checks, cryotip and DNA checks. They are also prohibited from donating sperm in more than one sperm bank and they can donate a limited times (usually up to 10 children from one donor). Finally, anonymity is kept indefinitely; the donor would never receive information regarding offspring, and vice versa.

=== New Zealand ===
In New Zealand, a voluntary policy law by fertility clinics limit one donor to "fathering" a maximum of 10 children to four families.

Around 1996–97, fertility clinics in New Zealand voluntarily agreed they would only accept donations from non-anonymous donors. The Human Assisted Reproductive Technology Act 2004 legislated that all donations made on or after 22 August 2005 must be non-anonymous.

=== Norway ===
Clinics in Norway have a maximum of eight children per donor. On 7 February 2020, the law changed. No limits on number of children per donor, but limited to only six families. Nå er maksgrensen på barn per sæddonor fjernet i Norge

=== Spain ===
The law provides that there must not be more than six births per donor. The same law applies to egg donations. Surrogacy is not allowed.

=== Sweden ===
In Sweden, a donor may give a child to a maximum of six couples. However, each pair may have a sibling in addition. Thus, the limit is 12 children per donor. Nevertheless, the Swedish National Board of Health and Welfare (Socialstyrelsen) recommends a maximum of 6 children per donor.

Artificial insemination by donor was previously done only if the woman was married or in registered cohabitation, and required written consent of the spouse or partner. This law has now changed allowing single women access to state funded fertility treatment although long waiting lists may prove prohibitive.

Sweden was the first place in the world to ban anonymous gamete donation, doing so in 1984. Donor conceived people have a right to request information about the donor from the age of 18.

=== Switzerland ===
In Switzerland, sperm donation is only allowed for married couples—not for unmarried couples or singles. A donor may give rise to a maximum of eight children.

=== UK ===
The Human Fertilisation and Embryology Authority (HFEA) sets a limit of 10 families within the UK which can be created using the gametes of one donor. However, there is no limit to the number of children who may be born to each such family from the same donor. A donor may set a lower limit and may impose conditions on the use of his sperm.

The HFEA allows donor conceived people aged 16 and older who were born after 1 August 1991 to request information about their half siblings conceived from the same donor. At 18, they can join the HFEA's Donor Sibling Link, which allows donor conceived people to find their genetic siblings and share contact details. Requested information does not include information about siblings from the same donor born abroad, so it may not tell the DCP their total number of genetic siblings if the sperm was imported or exported.

Donor conceived people in the UK have the right to know the identity of the donor when the person reaches the age of 18, if treatment was in the UK and conception occurred after March 31, 2005. Donors who donated between 1 August 1991 and 31 March 2005 can remove their own anonymity. Despite fears in the medical profession, the number of donors actually increased after anonymity was removed. In 2007, a parliamentary committee recommended that birth certificates include the identity of the donor, but this has not yet been legislated.

=== United States ===
In the United States, there are few regulations governing who may engage in sperm donation. The American Society for Reproductive Medicine and other expert groups (e.g., American Association of Tissue Banks) provide recommendations and guidelines, such as limiting a donor to 25 live births per population area of 850,000. These are not enforced by law, there is no central tracking, and it has been estimated that only about 40% of births are reported. It is likely that some donors have over one hundred genetic children. Some sperm banks impose lower limits; e.g., The Sperm Bank of California has a limit of ten families per donor, and the Rainbow Flag Sperm Bank has a limit of donor children by six different women. Other banks set their own limits with separate family limits in the US versus internationally, like Fairfax Cryobank at 25 families in the US and 15 internationally, and Xytex at 15 and 25 respectively, but these limits are in no way legally enforceable, and the number of offspring that result from each donor is unavailable to donors, donor conceived people, or recipient parents. Both Xytex and Fairfax have had incidents where donors had 70+ known offspring since introducing these limits for themselves.

As of July 2025, two states in the US have passed laws governing donor conception. In Colorado, donors are not allowed to continue to be used if children are known to have been born in more than 25 families, whether in or outside of Colorado, and since January 1, 2025, banks are not allowed to provide sperm sourced from donors who do not agree for their identity to be disclosed if requested by a DCP after they DCP turns 18. Banks must request updates from donors every 3 years to keep information current. Donors in Colorado must be at least 21 years of age, where federally they may be 18 or older.

As of 30 June 2025, Oregon passed SB163, which would require identity disclosure upon request of the donor conceived person. It is awaiting signature from the governor.

In 2005, the FDA placed a ban on men who have engaged in sex with another man in the last 5 years being able to donate sperm.

== See also ==
- Sperm donation
- Sperm bank
- Sperm theft
- Egg donor
- Donor conceived person
- Fertility tourism
- Artificial insemination
- Reproductive rights
- IVF
- Surrogacy
- Third party reproduction
