= Insemination =

Introduction of semen or sperm into the genital tract of a female animal

Insemination is the introduction of sperm (in semen) into a female's reproductive system in order to fertilize the ovum through sexual reproduction. The sperm enters into the uterus of a mammal or the oviduct of an oviparous (egg-laying) animal. Female humans and other mammals are inseminated during sexual intercourse or copulation, but can also be inseminated by artificial insemination.

In humans, the act and form of insemination has legal, moral and interpersonal implications. However, whether insemination takes place naturally or by artificial means, the pregnancy and the progress of it will be the same. Insemination may be called in vivo fertilisation (from in vivo meaning "within the living") because an egg is fertilized inside the body, this is in contrast with in vitro fertilisation (IVF).

== Plants ==
In plants, the fertilization process is referred to as pollination. It is the process of transfer of pollen grains from one anther to the stigma of other plants.

== Natural insemination ==
Insemination during sexual intercourse through penile–vaginal penetration is referred to as natural insemination (i.e., insemination by natural means). If an artificial lubricant needs to be used, care must be taken that it does not have spermicidal properties. During ejaculation, semen, containing male gametes known as sperm, is expelled from the penis through the male urethra into the moist and warm environment of the female reproductive tract. In humans, semen is usually ejaculated into the posterior vaginal fornix in direct contact with cervical mucus, though sperm may swim from other areas of the vagina or vulva to the cervix. The average volume of semen produced at ejaculation is 2 to 5 millilitres (about a teaspoon), containing an average of 182 million sperm. Only a small proportion of the sperm in each ejaculation reach the site of fertilization in the fallopian tubes, their numbers decreasing exponentially as they progress through the female reproductive tract. The majority of sperm either die in the acidic environment of the vagina or drip out with the semen. Prior to ovulation, the cervical mucus becomes thinner and more hospitable to sperm. Sperm swim rapidly into the uterus upon encountering cervical mucus, though many become lost in the cervical crypts where they either die or are delayed. Further attrition occurs in the uterus, where sperm are attacked by the female immune system. Only about 100–1000 sperm reach the fallopian tubes, where they may survive for up to six days. If ovulation occurs and the sperm encounter an ovum in the fallopian tube, fertilization may occur.

A woman may also be naturally inseminated while having penile–vaginal intercourse for pleasure without any intent to conceive. This may be unintentional as a result of the failure of a barrier or behavioural method of contraception, or may be intentional if relying on female contraceptive methods or indifferent to the possibility of pregnancy. In most cultures, insemination by a male through sexual intercourse, whether the woman's husband, normal sex partner or not, is subject to social and sexual inhibitions and taboos, and has legal, moral and interpersonal implications.

The term is also used in the context of third-party insemination, where a male who is not the woman's usual sexual partner (i.e., a sperm donor) fathers a child for the woman by providing his sperm through sexual intercourse rather than by providing his sperm for it to be used to produce a pregnancy in the woman by artificial means. The incidence of natural insemination by a sperm donor is usually a private matter, and may also carry greater health risks than where sperm has been processed by a fertility center. Advocates claim natural insemination generates higher pregnancy rates and a more 'natural' conception which does not involve the intervention and intrusion of third parties. However, it has not been medically proven that natural insemination has an increased chance of pregnancy. Additionally, conceiving through natural insemination is considered a natural process, so the father may be liable for child support and have custody and other rights of the child. The law usually draws a distinction between a man fathering a child by natural means, and a man who provides his sperm for it to be used to father a child by artificial means (i.e. by artificial insemination).

== Artificial insemination ==
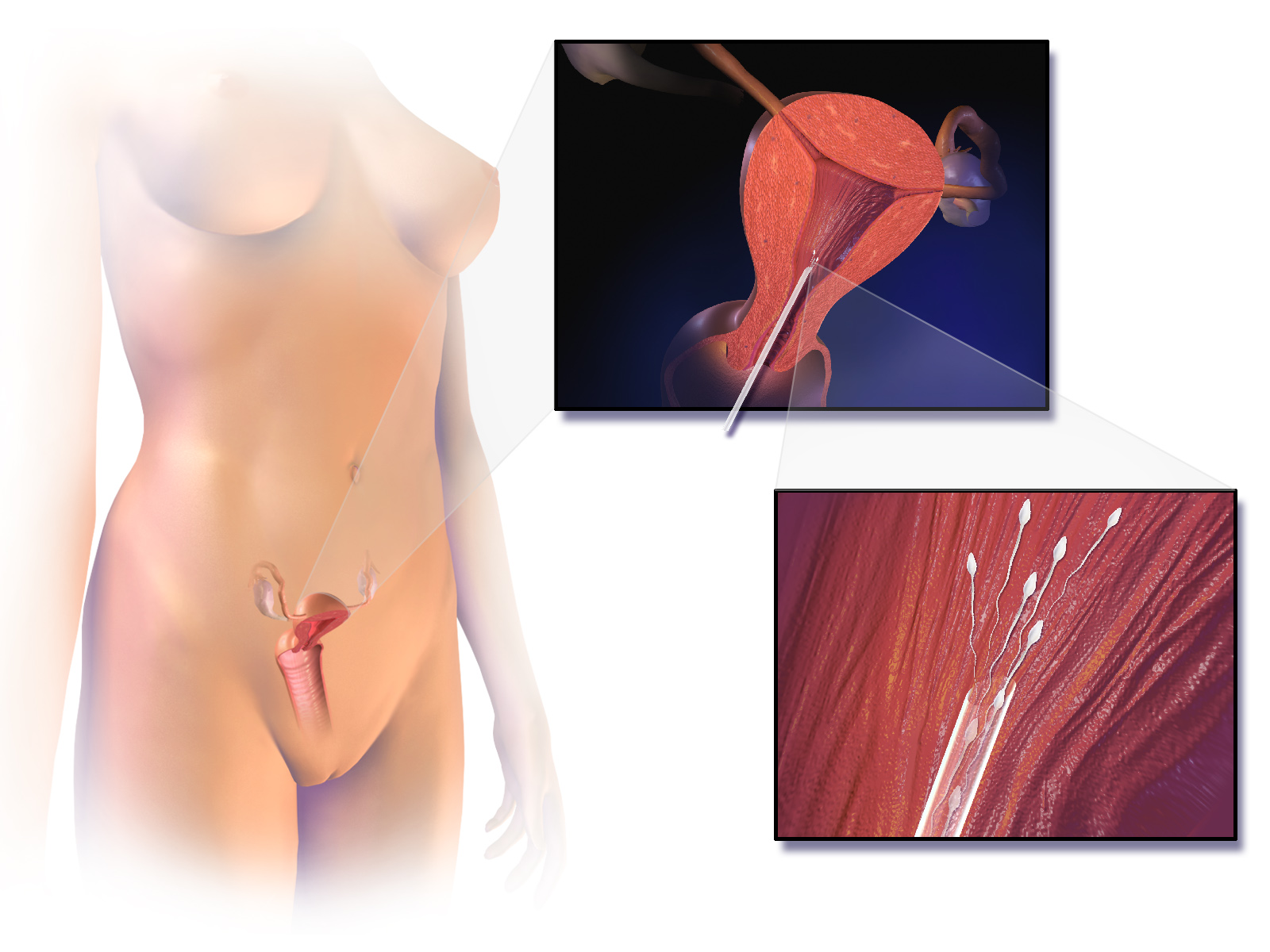
Artificial insemination

Artificial insemination is the introduction of sperm into the reproductive tract of a female by means other than sexual intercourse for the purpose of impregnating the female. In humans, artificial insemination may be used when a woman or her normal sex partner cannot, for any of a number of reasons, conceive by natural means. A number of artificial insemination strategies are available, including intracervical insemination (ICI) and intrauterine insemination (IUI). Compared with natural insemination, artificial insemination may be more invasive, and may require professional assistance and medical expertise, which will have a higher cost.

ICI attempts to simulate natural insemination, without the sexual element. It is painless and is the simplest, easiest and most common method of artificial insemination; it can be performed in the home, either by the female on herself or with non-professional assistance. ICI involves the introduction of unwashed or raw semen into the vagina at the entrance to the cervix, usually by means of a needleless syringe.

The sperm for insemination may be provided either by a sexual partner of the female's choice or by a sperm donor. Donor sperm is most commonly used by lesbian couples and single women, and by heterosexual couples when the male partner is suffering from male infertility. In some circumstances, sperm has been collected from males before they go off to war, or even right after they have died, and used to inseminate their female partners. In some countries, there are laws restricting and regulating who can donate sperm, who can receive artificial insemination, and what the legal consequences are of such insemination. Subject to any such restrictions, donor sperm is available to all women who want or need it. Women who live in a jurisdiction that prohibits them from being artificially inseminated may sometimes choose to obtain it by traveling to a jurisdiction that permits it.

Artificial insemination has been and continues to be commonly used in livestock breeding as an efficient way of increasing production.

== Other forms of insemination ==
In various other animal species, sperm can be introduced into the female's reproductive tract by various means. For example, in some species of hemiptera sperm can be introduced violently by traumatic insemination, parenteral injection through the body wall. In some species of animals, sperm finds its way through the body wall when the spermatophore is left in contact with the female's skin, such as in the onychophora (velvet worms).

== See also ==
- Assisted reproductive technology
- Conception device
- Fertilisation
- Fertility fraud
- Internal fertilization
- Sperm bank
- Sperm donation
- Sperm theft
