= Gammy =

Gammy may refer to:

- One of the children born in the 2014 Thai surrogacy controversy
- A disguise used by the character Pistachio Disguisey in the film The Master of Disguise
