= CBFC =

CBFC may refer to:

- Central Board of Film Censors (estb. 1963), Ministry of Information and Broadcasting, Pakistan
- Central Board of Film Certification (estb. 1952), Ministry of Information and Broadcasting, India; formerly known as the Central Board of Film Censors (1952-1983)
- Colwyn Bay F.C., Wales
- Craigmark Burntonians F.C., Scotland
- Cross-border fertility care or fertility tourism
