= Conception device =

Medical device used to assist in achievement of pregnancy

A conception device is a medical device which is used to assist in the achievement of a pregnancy, often, but not always, by means other than sexual intercourse (natural insemination, or NI). This article deals exclusively with conception devices for human reproduction.

== Types ==
=== Ovulation predictors ===
There are many conception devices on the market today that can be used for predicting ovulation so that sperm can be introduced into the reproductive tract of a woman at the appropriate time, whether by sexual intercourse, including NI or by artificial insemination. Ovulation is the time of the month when the oocyte, or egg, is released by the woman. This is identified as the most fertile time in a woman's menstrual cycle. Introducing semen into the vaginal cavity during the ovulation time, called 'timing of intercourse' or 'timing of artificial insemination', is important for achieving a pregnancy. Where a donor is being used, timing is particularly important because donor sperm which is supplied by a sperm bank or a fertility clinic is expensive and it is crucial that it be used at the opportune time. Similarly, where a private donor is used, he will usually wish to supply his sperm for artificial insemination or to inseminate using intercourse at the optimum time of the month.

One type of ovulation predictor is a saliva tester. To use it a woman spits onto a glass slide to observe when salt crystals are forming to identify when she is ovulating. The saliva salt crystal formation is known as "ferning", due to the visual similarity to a fern plant under the microscope as the saliva dries. This will show an increase in estrogen that is related to ovulation.

There are devices that are like wrist watches or patches affixed to sensitive areas of the skin that measure subtle body chemical changes on the surface of the skin to help to identify time of ovulation. Some devices also come with on-line help and support.

A commonly used ovulation predictor is the luteinizing hormone (LH) surge urine stick or ovulation predictor stick that helps to identify the time of ovulation. A woman will urinate on an LH surge stick once or twice a day, starting a few days before suspected ovulation. Often the stick will show two lines indicating that ovulation is 24–36 hours away.

=== Basal thermometer ===
A basal thermometer is an ultra sensitive thermometer that tracks the body's minutest temperature shift. A basal body temperature (BBT) thermometer is often used by women to chart their basal body temperature chart and hence to predict their fertile period or ovulation. A basal thermometer is more reliable and accurate than a simple glass thermometer since glass thermometers are only accurate to .2 degrees Fahrenheit whereas a basal thermometer is generally accurate to .1 degrees Fahrenheit.

The basal thermometer is used to chart a woman's fertile time of the month and is used in connection with a chart. The chart should show low temperatures before ovulation in the follicular phase, and higher ones after ovulation in the luteal phase. Using a basal thermometer in connection with a chart over several months should show the best times when conception can take place and enable the planning of intercourse or artificial insemination. However, times may vary slightly each month so that the user will need to check her temperature continually to ensure that she has the most accurate information. For this reason, some women prefer to use the basal thermometer in conjunction with other methods to ensure complete accuracy.

== Artificial insemination ==
There are a number of methods of artificial insemination. Various devices may be used including:

=== Conception cap ===
A conception cap can assist to protect semen from the vaginal cavity and allow semen to pool against the cervical os. Around the time of ovulation, a conception cap or cervical cap is filled with semen and placed on a woman's cervical os for several hours to maximize the time the semen is available to fertilise a waiting egg. These cervical caps are designed for conception and are different from the cervical caps used for contraception, although these may also be used as conception devices.

A conception cap may also be used after intercourse or artificial insemination by e.g. a needle-less syringe, and serve to keep the semen in place against the cervix.

Cervical caps are increasingly being used as a delivery system for semen from private sperm donors. They have the advantage over the use of needle-less syringes in that it is not necessary to wait until the semen liquifies before inserting the cap into the vagina, and the donor may ejaculate directly into the conception cap. However, a variation is a conception cap to which a narrow tube is attached through which liquefied or frozen and thawed donor semen is inserted by means of a catheter. The narrow tube is then removed. The advantage of this type of device is that it is inserted empty into the vagina and can be positioned around the cervix without risk of seepage of sperm. This device is growing in popularity because its use ensures that the donor's semen is deposited as close as possible to the cervix, and it can be kept there while the woman goes about her normal activities for several hours to aid conception.

=== Semen collectors ===
Semen collectors are sheaths (condoms) made specifically for conception and approved by the FDA. Collection condoms are condoms primarily used to collect semen during sexual intercourse. Contraceptive condoms are generally made of latex, and are designed for contraception and preventing spread of sexually transmitted diseases. Collection condoms are sterile and made from silicone or polyurethane, as latex is somewhat harmful to sperm. They are usually non-lubricated and have a teat end or reservoir to collect the sperm. Collection condoms may be used to facilitate the collection of semen by masturbation or they may be used to collect a semen sample through intercourse.

Semen can also be collected by masturbation directly into a sterile container, such as a specimen cup which is usually a clear plastic container with a lid. Some semen collectors have an in-built test tube which allows the collection of the semen without the male having to touch the sample. After collection, the cup portion is removed and replaced by a screw top on the test tube. This device also ensures that none of the sample is lost when transferring it from one container to another.

Donors may also use a female condom to collect a semen sample. When used in this way, a female condom may be known as a 'baggy'.

A male collection kit usually consists of a collection condom, a specimen cup and, if required, a semen transporter. The latter comprises a sealed container for the sperm and a plastic box containing dry ice into which the container is placed so that it can be sent to a recipient. Transmission is generally by courier.

Male collection kits are used for sending semen to a laboratory for analysis, for sending semen to a partner for artificial insemination if the male is absent, and, most commonly, by private sperm donors or sperm donors donating through an agency. A sperm agency will generally supply the male collection kit to donors. The kit allows donors to obtain sperm samples privately as opposed to in a fertility clinic, and samples may be obtained by sexual intercourse which usually results in greater fecundity. However, if sperm is being supplied by a private donor, the use of a collection kit does not guarantee that the sample actually derives from a particular person.

=== Needle-less syringe ===
A needle-less syringe may be used to insert donor or partner sperm into the vagina for intracervical inseminations (ICI). The syringe may be used by the recipient woman (self-insemination), or by a third party, often a nurse or doctor. With this type of syringe, it is necessary to wait until the semen liquifies before it can be used.

Syringes are also available which are specially designed for DIY inseminations using a donor. These consist of a funnel which is connected directly to the syringe. The donor ejaculates into the funnel allowing the semen to drop directly into the syringe. A plunger is inserted and the syringe is then placed vertically to expel the air. The semen is pushed to the tip of the syringe which may then be inserted into the vagina. This type of syringe has the advantage over the standard needle-less syringe in that semen can be used for an insemination immediately after ejaculation, without having to wait for it to liquify.

=== Catheter ===
A specially designed catheter may be used to insert specially washed sperm directly into the uterus for intrauterine inseminations (IUI). The procedure is normally carried out by a physician and has a better pregnancy rate than ICI insemination. This method is commonly offered by fertility clinics using donor sperm because the increased pregnancy rate results in fewer donor samples being used for the same number of pregnancies. Semen used for IUI must first be 'washed' to provide a pure sperm sample: this prevents 'cramping' following the insemination.

=== Sperm separator ===
This invention consists of a sterile, disposable, compartmentalized swim-up column for the swimming-up of spermatozoa (developed by Prof. Zavos), at desired levels of dilution in a suitable media, and a swimming down of spermatozoa into compartments within the column. This device allows for the separation of semen samples in relation to sperm morphology, motility, progressive motility, speed, sperm concentration, fertilisation potential, and sex ratio. The device comprises a hollow, vertically supported column, having a closed lower end, and an open upper end. This device facilitates the use of particular concentrations of sperm for certain uses, e.g. IUI or assisted reproductive technology (ART), and it also allows for fertilisation by the use of gender-separated sperm, although the use of the separator for this purpose does not appear to be 100% reliable.

=== Vaginal speculum ===
A vaginal speculum is commonly used in artificial insemination procedures and are routinely used for IUI inseminations.

The device consists of two shaped flanges which are inserted into the vagina and can be opened and locked in the open position to allow the cervix to be viewed. A syringe containing sperm or a catheter may then be inserted through the open speculum and into the opened vagina. This device enables sperm to be more accurately deposited near to the cervix or, in the case of IUI, directly into the womb.

Disposable specula are manufactured from transparent plastic, while stainless-steel specula may be sterilised and re-used.

=== Sperm-friendly lubricant ===
Conventional lubricants contain chemicals which may damage sperm. Sperm-friendly lubricants have been developed which specifically aid conception by creating a chemical balance in the vagina which is conducive to fertilisation.

Sperm-friendly lubricants are sometimes sold with an applicator so that the lubricant can be applied directly into the vagina. The lubricant may also be applied to a needle-less syringe or conception cap filled with sperm before it is inserted into the vagina. Sperm-friendly lubricants are commonly used for all forms of artificial insemination. If a pregnancy is being attempted by sexual intercourse where the partners are attempting to achieve a pregnancy, or by natural insemination (NI) with a sperm donor, a sperm-friendly lubricant should always be used rather than a normal sexual lubricant. Normal sexual lubricants may contain chemicals which can damage the sperm. When used for sexual intercourse, sperm-friendly lubricant may be applied to the donor's or partner's penis, as well as directly into the vagina.

=== Artificial insemination kit ===
Artificial insemination kits are marketed to those wishing to carry out a personal artificial insemination. They generally comprise collection condoms or collection pots, syringes and pregnancy tests. More sophisticated artificial insemination kits may also include ovulation tests, an ovulation chart, a basal thermometer, fertility lubricant, soft-cups and vaginal speculums. Where a donor is being used, STI testing equipment may also be included. Artificial insemination kits are widely available on-line, especially from gay parenting organizations. They are frequently purchased by single women or couples seeking to get pregnant, and also by sperm donors.

== See also ==
- Artificial insemination
- Assisted reproductive technology
- Designer babies
- Ejaculation
- Fertility monitor
- Infertility
- Sperm bank
- Sperm donation
- Sperm theft
- Surrogacy
