= Fertility tourism =

Traveling abroad to seek fertility treatment

Fertility tourism (also referred to as reproductive tourism or cross border reproductive care) is the practice of traveling to another country or jurisdiction for fertility treatment, and may be regarded as a form of medical tourism. Infertility refers to the inability to get pregnant after having unprotected sexual intercourse for 12 months. Infertility, or the inability to get pregnant, affects about 8-12% of couples looking to conceive or 186 million people globally. In some places, rates of infertility surpass the global average and can go up to 30% depending on the country. Areas with lack of resources, such as assisted reproductive technologies (ARTs), tend to correlate with the highest rates of infertility.

The main procedures sought are in vitro fertilization (IVF), artificial insemination by a donor, as well as surrogacy. These methods are types of assisted reproductive technology (ARTs). The popularity of each procedure varies from country to country.

People are mainly driven towards fertility tourism due to lack of resources and high costs, while other contributing factors include cultural, religious, legal, and safety and efficacy issues. Other impacts on the need for fertility treatments from other countries include those who are infertile, single, of older age, or identify as a part of the LGBTQIA+ community. With these rising conditions, people end up having to travel to other countries in order to get the fertility treatments not accessible to them in their home countries.

People may choose fertility tourism for several reasons. Legal restrictions in their home country can make some fertility treatments difficult or unavailable, leading patients to seek treatment in countries with different regulations. Cost is another important factor, as treatment may be less expensive in some destinations. In addition, cultural factors, such as language, religion, and familiarity with the destination, may influence their decisions. However, individuals using overseas treatment should also consider safety concerns, differences in medical practices, and follow-up care upon returning home.

== IVF ==
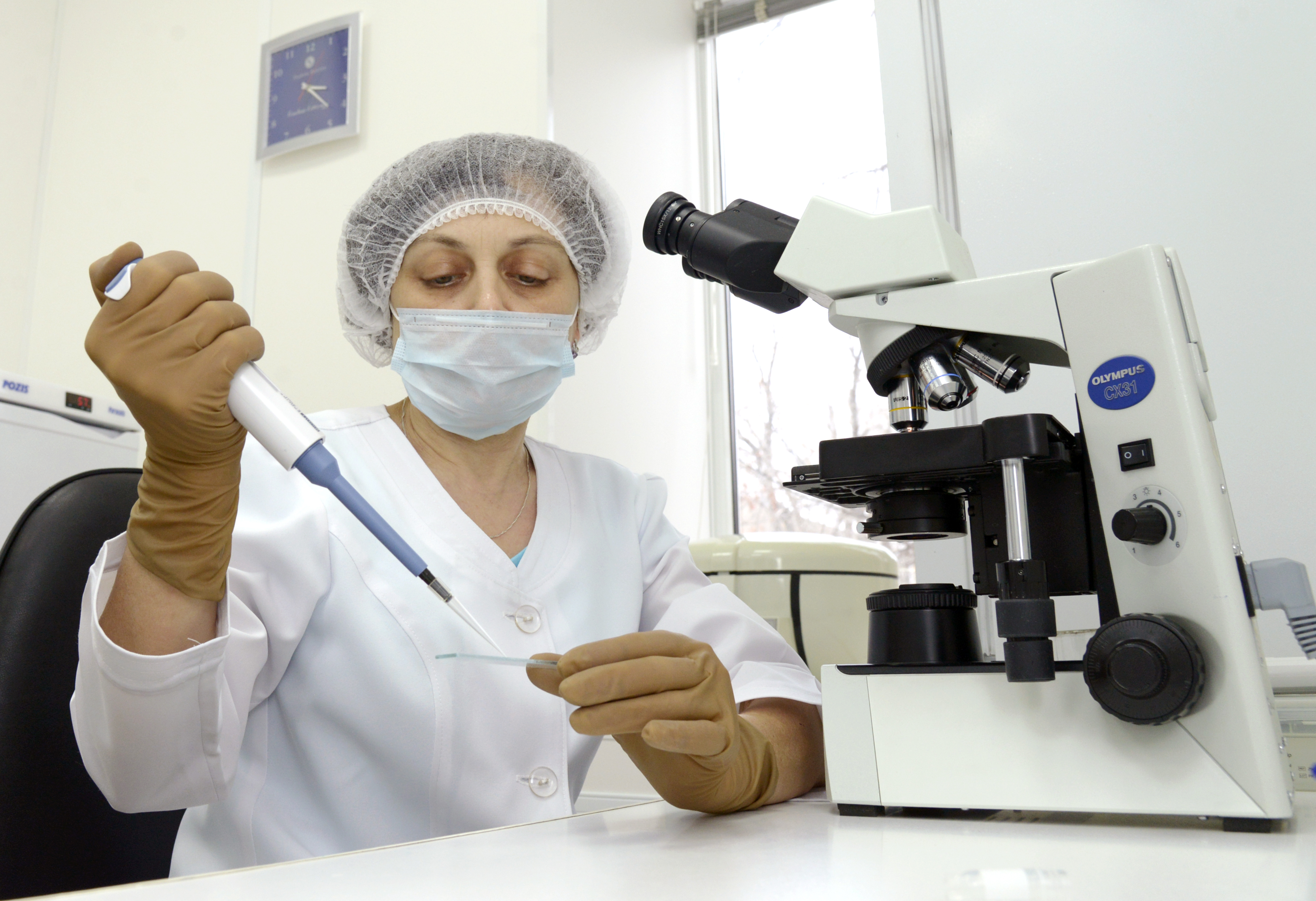
IVF Laboratory

=== Destinations ===
About 20,000 to 25,000 women (often accompanied by their partners) annually seek cross-border assisted reproductive technology (ART) services. Some countries are more popular than others as IVF destinations due to higher success rates and fewer regulations. Even small countries such as Barbados provide JCI-accredited IVF treatment aimed at women from abroad.

==== Israel ====
Reproduction is a central goal in Israel, a leading fertility tourism destination for in vitro fertilization (IVF) treatment with over three decades of major technologies in the assisted reproduction industry. The trajectory of assisted reproductive technology is outlined through the expansion of IVF, the globalization of donating gametes, and the privatization of service.

==== United States ====
Many Europeans travel to the United States because of the higher success rates and more liberal regulations under the Fertility Clinic Success Rate and Certification Act, which was passed in 1992. In the United States, affiliation between the right and left sides of the political spectrum motivated the protection of human life, even during the in vitro embryonic stages.

==== India ====
India and other Asian countries are the main destinations for U.S. women seeking fertility treatment, being the destinations for 40% of U.S. women seeking IVF and 52% seeking IVF with egg donation. The success rate of embryonic transfer through IVF has continually increased, resulting in more pregnancy outcomes.

==== Mexico ====
In recent years, Mexico has become a destination for cross-border IVF treatment due to its liberal ART and egg donation policies with over 50 clinics throughout the country that utilize assisted reproductive technology. Mexico does not have legal regulations that restrict or prohibit IVF or egg donations in Mexican clinics, making it a top destination for infertility treatment for people in the United States.

=== Cost factors ===
Women from countries such as the United States and the United Kingdom may travel for IVF treatment and medications to save money. The cost of one IVF cycle in the United States averages US $15,000, while for comparable treatment in Mexico it is about US $7,800, Thailand $6,500, India $3,300, and Iran $2,500. When calculating these costs, the costs of the hotel, travel, and hospital stay may also be considered in addition to the medical treatment.

=== Egg donation ===
Egg donation is illegal in a number of European countries including Germany, Austria, and Italy. Many women then will seek treatment in places where the procedure is allowed, such as Spain and the United States where donors can be paid for their donation. Almost half of all IVF treatments with donor eggs in Europe are performed in Spain. IVF with anonymous egg donation is also the main ART sought by Canadians traveling to the U.S., and is the sought procedure for 80% of cross-border treatments by Canadians.

=== Sex selection ===
Sex selection is prohibited in many countries, including the United Kingdom, Australia and Canada, India, except when it is used to screen for genetic diseases. Some women wishing to be sure of a child's sex may travel to countries where it is legal to perform a preimplantation genetic diagnosis (PGD, a potential expansion of IVF), which can be used for sex selection, such as in Iran and the United States.

=== Risks ===
==== Multiple births ====
The rate of complications increases as more and more embryos are implanted. Many countries have no restriction on how many embryos may be transferred into the uterus at the same time, increasing the risk of multiple pregnancy and resultant potential complications. These complications may affect both the mother and the child. Birth defects have been thought to arise from IVF, however not enough information is available on this topic. In 2005, 35% of all IVF–ET births in the US were multiple births (twins, triplets, or more). The burden of multiple births generated by placing too many embryos is carried by the individuals and the home country.

== Donor insemination ==
Two thousand babies are born from treatments using sperm donations every year. A woman may go to another country to obtain artificial insemination by donor. The motivation to seek donors from outside countries may come from a want for a greater variety of gamete donors. Stricter laws or an inability to meet the criteria necessary in ones respective countries are other possible reasons. The practice is influenced by the attitudes and sperm donation laws in the host country.

There is generally a demand for sperm donors who have no genetic problems in their family, 20/20 eyesight, with excellent visual acuity, a college degree, and sometimes a value on a certain height, age, eye colour, hair texture, blood type and ethnicity . According to sociology professor Lisa Jean Moore, there is "anecdotal evidence" that sperm from blonde, blue-eyed men is most in demand.

=== Destinations ===
==== Denmark ====
Denmark has a well-developed system of sperm export. This success mainly comes from the reputation of Danish sperm donors for being of high quality and, in contrast with the law in the other Nordic countries, gives donors the choice of being either anonymous or non-anonymous to the receiving couple. The maximum amount of families that may use the sperm of one donor is capped at 12. Nordic sperm donors tend to be tall, with rarer features like blond hair or different color eyes and a light complexion, and highly educated and have altruistic motives for their donations, partly due to the relatively low monetary compensation in Nordic countries. More than 50 countries worldwide are importers of Danish sperm, including Paraguay, Canada, Kenya, and Hong Kong.

==== United States ====
US sperm is equally sought out for. Denmark and the United States both claim that they have the largest sperm bank supply. Specifically, the California Cryobank believes it is the largest sperm bank in the world. The donations from this sperm bank have reached over 100 countries and accounts for over 75,000 births globally. There is no limit as to how many families may use the donation of one sperm donor.

=== Shortages ===
Some countries such as United Kingdom and Sweden, have a shortage of sperm donors. Sweden now has an 18-month-long waiting list for donor sperm.

As a consequence of the shortage of donor sperm in UK in the late 1990s and the early years of the 21st century, British women travelled to Belgium and Spain for donor insemination, until those two countries changed their laws and imposed a maximum number of children one donor may produce. Prior to the change in the law, the limit in the number of children born to each donor depended upon practitioners at fertility clinics, and Belgian and Spanish clinics were purchasing donor sperm from abroad to satisfy demand for treatments. Anonymous donation was permitted in Belgium and is a legal requirement in Spain. These two countries also allowed single heterosexual and single and coupled lesbians to undergo fertility treatment. Ironically, at the time, many Belgian and Spanish clinics were buying sperm from British clinics donated by British donors, and they were able to use that sperm according to local laws and limits. In addition, lesbian women from France and eastern Europe travelled to these countries in order to achieve a pregnancy by an anonymous donor since this treatment was not available to them in their own countries. British fertility tourists must therefore now travel to other countries, particularly those that do not include children born to foreigners in their national totals of children produced by each donor. Britain also imports donor sperm from Scandinavia but can only limit the use of that donor's sperm to ten families in the UK itself, so that more children may be produced elsewhere from the same donor.

At least 250 Swedish sperm recipients travel to Denmark annually for insemination. Some of this is also due to that Denmark also allows single women to be inseminated.

It is illegal to pay donors for eggs or sperm in Canada. Women can still import commercial U.S. sperm, but that is not true for eggs, resulting in many Canadian women leaving the country for such procedures.

== Surrogacy ==
=== Legal controversies and citizenship ===
Worldwide, there are different laws and regulations regarding surrogacy; these laws include restrictions on eligibility, legality of cross-border procedures, and even surrogate compensation. This variance heavily influences where parents travel for surrogacy services. . For instance, there are places where there is a lack of laws or guidelines for surrogacy and many custody battles have resulted in outlawing surrogacy and deeming parental rights to the surrogate over the intended parents, or fully legalizing surrogacy all together. In countries where surrogacy is banned, there have been many instances where the intended parents go to different destination for surrogacy, but then have difficulty bringing their new children back to their countries. Also, there are some countries that ban commercial surrogacy, but allow unpaid "altruistic surrogacy" and also provide contracts to the involved parties.

The citizenship and legal status of a child resulting from surrogacy can be problematic. The Hague Conference Permanent Bureau identified the question of citizenship of these children as a "pressing problem" in the Permanent Bureau 2014 Study (Hague Conference Permanent Bureau, 2014a: 84–94). According to the Bureau of Consular Affairs, U.S. Department of State, either one or both of the child's genetic parents must be a U.S. citizen for the child to be considered a U.S. citizen. In other words, the only way for the child to acquire U.S. citizenship automatically at birth is if he/she is biologically related to a U.S. citizen. Further, in some countries, the child will not be a citizen of the country in which he/she is born because the surrogate mother is not legally the parent of the child. This could result in a child being born without citizenship.

=== Religious views ===
There are many differing religious views surrounding surrogacy with regards to lineage and heritability, motherhood, and marital fidelity. Judaism, Hinduism, Islam, and other Christian denominations outside of Catholicism generally approve of surrogacy, but each with some concerns. With Judaism, there are concerns regarding legitimacy and most tend to believe that motherhood belongs to the person who actively delivers the child. Hinduism views infertility as a curse to be cured by any means necessary, generally approving of surrogacy. There is Islamic religious concern centered mainly around the importance of and confusion of lineage and inheritance. Other Christian denominations have a wide variety of views from encouraging surrogacy as it shares the blessing of parenthood, to viewing surrogacy as a means of confused identity in a child and a disruption in traditional marital practices and procreation. Catholicism; however, generally views any third party involved in marriage or procreation to be an intrusion, and thus commonly views gestational surrogacy as an intrusion to the marital bond. Religion has led to legal bans on surrogacy in some countries. For instance, in Costa Rica the Catholic church successfully lobbied to ban surrogacy.

=== Destinations ===
Some countries, such as the United States, Canada, Georgia, Ukraine, and Russia are popular foreign surrogacy destinations. Eligibility, processes and costs differ from country to country. Previously popular destinations, India, Nepal, Thailand, and Mexico have since 2014 banned commercial surrogacy for non-residents or allow it only for heterosexual married couples. Thailand criminalized surrogacy by foreigners and same-sex couples in 2014, prompted by incidents of surrogate parents behaving badly. The most notable of those cases was that of Baby Gammy, a twin born with Down syndrome and left behind by the Australians who contracted his birth (his sister, who was not born with the disorder, was taken with them to Australia). It did not help that Gammy's biological father was also a convicted sex offender.

Fertility tourism for surrogacy is driven by legal restrictions in the home country or the incentive of lower prices abroad. Popular destinations are those which permit commercial gestational surrogacy, where the cost is relatively low, and which give the intended parents legal rights over the newborn child, whether by streamlined adoption procedures or direct parental rights.

==== India ====
India was a main destination for surrogacy because of the relatively low cost until international surrogacy was outlawed in 2015. Although there are no official figures available, a 2012 United Nations report counted around 3,000 fertility clinics in India. India's surrogacy business was estimated at around $1 billion annually.

Indian surrogates became increasingly popular amongst intended parents in industrialized nations because of the relatively low costs and easy access offered by Indian surrogacy agencies. Clinics charged people between $10,000 and $28,000 for the complete package, including fertilization, the surrogate's fee, and delivery of the baby at a hospital. Including the costs of flight tickets, medical procedures and hotels, this represented roughly a third of the price of the procedure in the UK and a fifth of that in the US.

In 2013, surrogacy by foreign homosexual couples and single parents was banned. In 2015, the government banned commercial surrogacy in India and permitted entry of embryos only for research purposes.

==== Russia ====
Liberal legislation makes Russia attractive for "reproductive tourists" looking for techniques not available in their countries. Intended parents come there for oocyte donation, because of advanced age or marital status (single women and single men) and when surrogacy is considered. Gestational surrogacy, even commercial is absolutely legal in Russia, being available for practically all adults willing to be parents. Foreigners have the same rights for assisted reproduction as Russian citizens. Within 3 days after the birth the commissioning parents obtain a Russian birth certificate with both their names on it. Genetic relation to the child (in case of donation) doesn't matter. On 4 August 2010, a Moscow court ruled that a single man who applied for gestational surrogacy (using donor eggs) could be registered as the only parent of his son, becoming the first man in Russia to defend his right to become a father through a court procedure. The surrogate mother's name was not listed on the birth certificate; the father was listed as the only parent. However, courts do not always take the side of such parents. In 2014, a Moscow court denied registration of the baby born via surrogacy to the single man; the decision was upheld on appeal.

==== Ukraine ====
Ukraine has seen a significant increase in international surrogacy since 2015, when the practice was banned in several Asian countries that had been popular destinations. Surrogacy is completely legal in Ukraine. However, only healthy mothers who have had at least one child before can become surrogates. Ukrainian surrogate mother are mostly from small towns or rural areas. The full surrogate package may cost around $50,000, with the surrogate receiving less than 50% of that amount. Surrogates in Ukraine have zero parental rights over the child, as stated on Article 123 of the Family Code of Ukraine. Thus, a surrogate cannot refuse to hand the baby over in case she changes her mind after birth. Only married couples can legally go through gestational surrogacy in Ukraine, but they have to be able to prove they cannot carry a baby themselves for medical reasons. Also at least one parent must have a genetic link to the baby (egg donors are therefore frequently used). Gay couples and single parents are prohibited to use gestational surrogates.

The ongoing war and Russian invasion of Ukraine has not stopped the surrogacy industry. From the beginning of the invasion in February 2022 to July 2023 more than 1,000 children have been born in Ukraine to surrogate mothers. Six hundred children were born at the BiotexCom clinic in Kyiv, one of Europe's largest surrogacy clinics. Foreigners still traveled to Ukraine to collect the babies they had paid for despite the constant threat of Russian bombardments. In March 2022 Ukrainian MPs proposed prohibiting foreigners from using the services of Ukrainian surrogate mothers during martial law, but this proposal was voted down two months later.

==== Belarus ====
Surrogacy is legally allowed in Belarus from 2006, however, major clients for such kind of services in this country are mainly Russian citizens. According to Belarusian legislation, surrogacy can be used here due to strict medical indications by married heterosexual couples and single women (for single women only in case they are able to provide their own oocytes). Unlike Russia or Ukraine, in Belarus Intended Mother is written not only in the legal birth certificate issued by local authorities, but also appear in the medical birth certificate given by the Maternity House, where delivery of the surrogate mother took place. This gives to the Intended Parents legal ability to take baby directly from the Maternity house, being sure that no one will claim parental rights over the children born via surrogacy.

In Belarus only healthy women in the age from 20 to 35 years old, who are in legal marriage and have at least one healthy child can be surrogate mothers. Essential conditions of surrogacy agreement, that should be notarized, are also specified in the Law "On Assisted Reproductive Technologies".

==== United States ====
People travel to the United States for surrogacy procedures for the high quality of medical technology and care, as well as the high level of legal protections afforded through some US state courts to surrogacy contracts as compared to other countries. Increasingly, same sex couples who face restrictions using IVF and surrogacy procedures in their home countries travel to US states where it is legal.

The United States is occasionally sought as a location for surrogate mothers by couples seeking a green card in the US, since the resulting child can get birthright citizenship in the United States and can thereby apply for green cards for the parents when the child turns 21 years of age. Surrogacy costs in USA between $95,000 and $150,000 for the complete package, including fertilization, legal fees, compensation, the agency's fee.

==== Canada ====
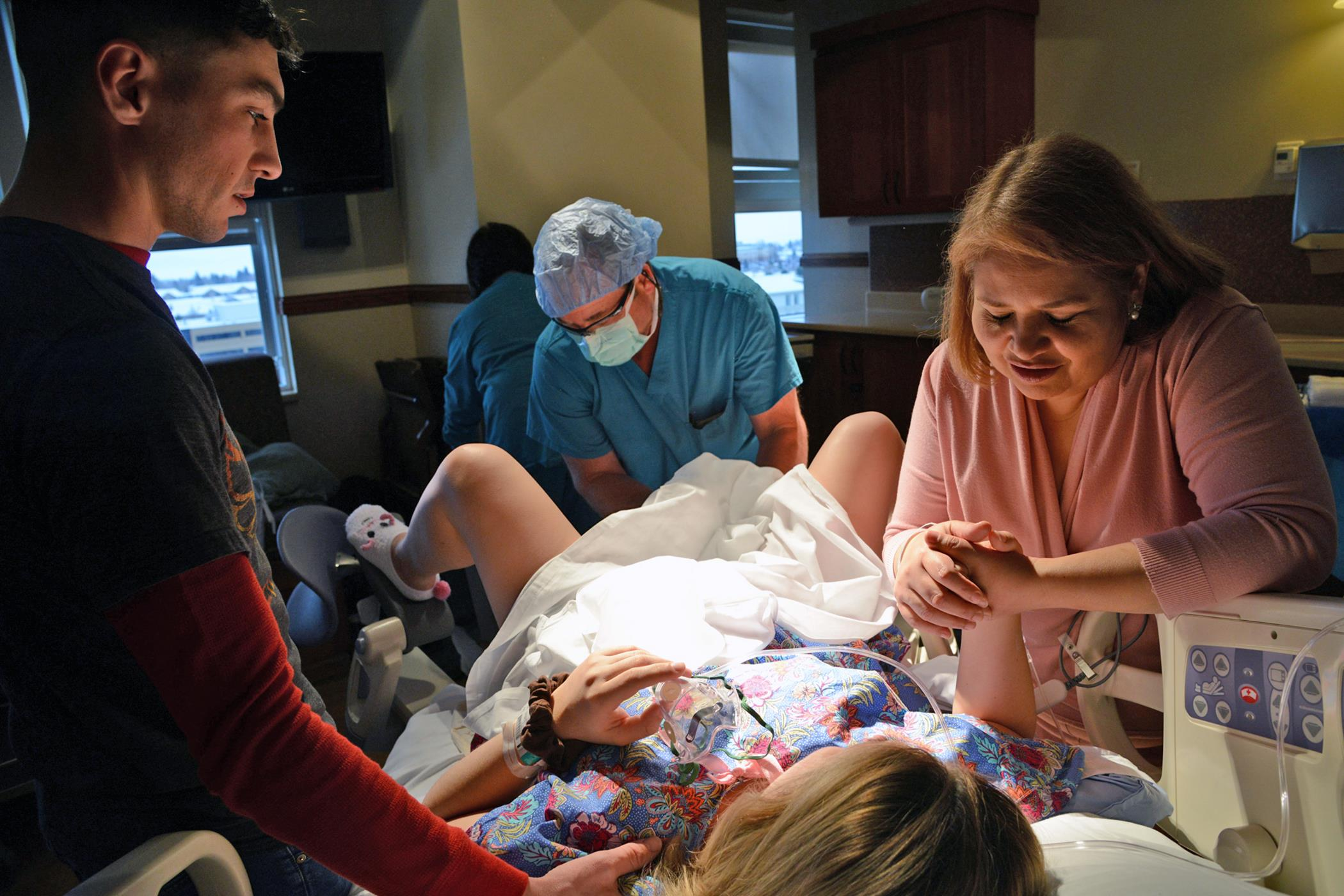
Surrogate parents attending birth

Canada has recently become a more popular foreign surrogacy destination, with almost half the babies born to Canadian surrogates in British Columbia in 2016 and 2017 being for foreign parents.

Numerous reasons have been proposed to explain Canada's rising popularity as an international surrogacy destination. For one, Canada is one of the few destinations that still allows surrogacy for foreign commissioning parents. While, Greece, Ukraine, Russia, Georgia and a few U.S. states also permit surrogacy for foreign commissioning parents, Canada does not discriminate on the basis of marital status or sexual orientation. Canada is also attractive because it is fairly efficient in granting legal parental rights, declaring legal parenthood and issuing birth certificates within weeks of birth. This contrasts with other countries with lengthier processes that often deter commissioning parents wanting to quickly return home with their new babies. Canada's strong and universal healthcare system also makes it a favourable international surrogacy destination, as pregnant women in Canada receive high-quality, publicly funded healthcare throughout pregnancy, during delivery, and after birth. This reduces the risk of pregnancy complications, which is often a significant concern of commissioning parents.

==== Mexico ====
While surrogacy is unregulated in most regions of Mexico, many intended parents travel to Mexico for the purpose of surrogacy. Mexico is one of only several countries in the world which allow foreigners, LGBTQ+ couples, and single intended parents to access surrogacy. The legality of surrogacy was confirmed by the 2021 ruling by the Supreme Court of Mexico which found that restrictions placed on access to surrogacy based on marital status, sexuality, or nationality unconstitutional.

The cost of surrogacy in Mexico is lower than that in the United States because of lower average compensation paid to a surrogate mother and lower medical costs in general. Surrogacy costs in Mexico range between $80,000 and $100,000 USD for a complete package, including fertilization, legal fees, compensation for a surrogate mother, and agency's fee.
