= McD v. L =

- Court: Supreme Court of Ireland
- Full case name: McD. v L. & anor
- Decided: 10 December 2009
- Citation: [2009] IESC 81

Court membership
- Judges sitting: Murray CJ, Denham J, Geoghegan J, Fennelly J, Hardiman J

McD v L is a ruling by the Supreme Court of Ireland, handed down on 10 December 2009, that granted a sperm donor visitation rights to a child born via artificial insemination. The case has been viewed as a victory by advocates for the rights of sperm donors and the men's rights movement.

== Background ==
The donor, a gay man whose identity remains anonymous, had been friends with the lesbian couple to whom he donated sperm in 2006. However, the trio subsequently had a falling out and the women attempted to relocate to Australia. The donor obtained an injunction to prevent the mothers from leaving the country. He subsequently sought legal guardianship of the child.

== See also ==
- Men's rights
- Sperm donation
