= Embryo donation =

Giving up an embryo without compensation

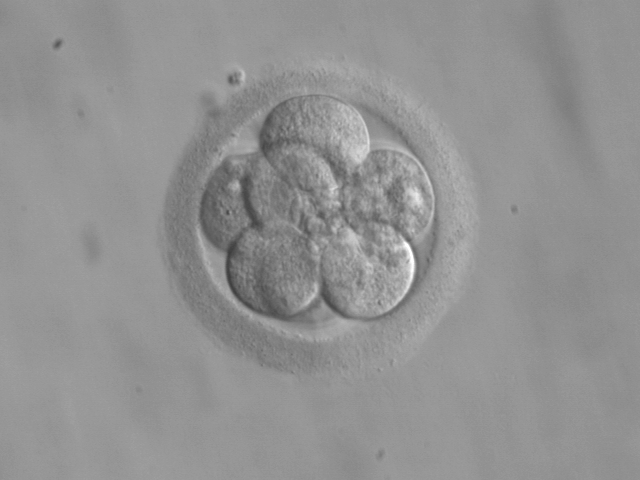
8-cell human embryo, day 3

Embryo donation is one disposition option for users of in vitro fertilisation with remaining fresh or frozen embryos. It is defined as the giving—generally without compensation—of embryos remaining after in vitro fertilization procedures to recipients for procreative implantation or research. Most IVF users with supernumerary embryos make embryo donation decisions after completing their families or discontinuing use of in vitro fertilization. Recipients of embryos donated for procreative implantation typically plan to transfer fresh or frozen embryos into a prepared uterus in order to facilitate pregnancy and childbirth. Recipients of embryos donated for research typically use them for clinical training, quality improvement research, or human embryonic stem cell research.

== History ==
Soon after in vitro fertilization became a common clinical practice, clinicians discovered a way to preserve embryos in frozen storage and thaw them for implantation later. This procedure can spare a woman donor from a second egg harvesting procedure. Soon thereafter, reports were published documenting successful pregnancies and births from cryopreserved donor embryos. Again, however, these were embryos made from donor gametes specifically for the recipients. No one knows for sure when the first true embryo adoption occurred. The term was used as early as the mid-1980s, in the legal literature.

The matter gained another political dimension in the United States when Congress and the Bush administration budgeted $1 million to promote embryo adoption. The Dobbs v. Jackson Women's Health Organization decision created new legal issues for in-vitro fertilization. In February 2024, the Alabama Supreme Court ruled in LePage v. Center for Reproductive Medicine that frozen embryos should be considered living beings under the state's Wrongful Death of a Minor law, which was enacted in the wake of Dobbs. Several IVF clinics in the state, fearing they would be held liable for accidental loss of embryos, suspended operations. The ruling created a de facto ban on IVF in Alabama until a new law granting protections to IVF procedures was passed a month later. According to Politico, more cases are likely in the future, with "the Catholic Church and a growing number of evangelicals... [believing] all IVF is wrong because it separates conception from the sexual act between husband and wife".

== For research ==
Embryo donation to research provides a major source of stem cells for stem cell research. The hope is that stem cell research will aid in finding cures for various major diseases such as Alzheimer's disease, cancer, spinal muscular atrophy (SMA), and Parkinson's disease. Some stem cell research is done by using human embryos, and one option that parents have once they are done with in vitro fertilization is to donate their unused embryos to stem cell research. One review came to the result that the proportion of IVF users who donated embryos for research varied geographically, from 7% in France to 73% in Switzerland. A study done in the United States revealed that 60% of American donors would donate the unused embryos to science.

People who donate embryos for research often have been found in a review to report feelings of reciprocity towards science and medicine, positive views of research and high levels of trust in the medical system. They have described the decision to donate as better than the destruction of embryos, and as an opportunity to help others or to improve health and IVF technology. On the other hand, reported factors that make people refrain from embryo donation to research include a perception of risks, a lack of information concerning research projects and the medical system, as well as conceptualization of embryos in terms of personhood. The influence of sociodemographic characteristics and reproductive and gynecological history have mainly been found to be inconclusive.

== For procreative implantation ==
Embryo donation for procreative implantation is a form of third party reproduction. Embryo donation can be anonymous (donor and recipient parties are not known to each other, and individuals have no ability to contact one another), semi-open (parties can interact via a third party, but do not share personally identifiable information in order to provide a layer of privacy protection), open (party identities and contact information are shared so the families can interact directly in various types of relationships), or ID disclosure (donor-conceived youth can request and receive donor contact information when the donor-conceived reaches the age of 18). Any children born from embryo donation for procreation would be biologically related to the gamete donors used when creating the embryos. This is the same principle as is followed in egg donation or sperm donation.

=== Embryo donation or adoption ===
Some use the term "embryo donation" to refer strictly to anonymous embryo donation, and "embryo adoption" to refer to an open relationship. Others use the terms interchangeably because, regardless of the relationship, a clinical assisted reproduction procedure is involved, and the recipient couple is preparing to raise a child not genetically related to them. Donated embryos are much less likely to be viable. Lawyers who assist those trying to acquire an embryo state the term "embryo adoption" is a misnomer because the transfer of an embryo is handled as property transfer. One newspaper article in 2005 asserted that abortion rights advocates, advocates of embryonic stem cell research, and members of the fertility industry object to referring to the transfer as an "adoption" because they feel it gives an embryo the same status as a child. One organization, Nightlight Christian Adoptions, matches embryos with couples willing to use them. Children that are a result of this process may be called snowflake babies. Another organization that offers these services is the National Embryo Donation Center, which requires recipients to be a heterosexual couple that have been married for at least three years. In 2022, embroyos that had been frozen for almost 30 years resulted in live births. Out of five transferred, two survived to develop into twins. In 2025, a 30 year old embroyo became the oldest to result in a live birth.

=== Donor options ===
According to a survey by the American Society for Reproductive Medicine, 54% of fertility patients want to preserve their remaining embryos for future use. Another 21% want to donate leftover embryos for research. Donating embryos for research may be a good alternative when patients receive proper, honest and clear information about the research project, the procedures and the scientific value of the research. The remaining 7% of those surveyed are willing to donate leftover embryos to another couple.

Dr. Jeffrey Nelson is Director of the Huntington Reproductive Center, one of California's largest IVF clinics. He reports that "Twenty-five per cent of patients want to donate their [spare] embryos – not as many as I'd like." He added, "People tend to hold on to their embryos because they don't want to make a decision. We started buying more and more cryopreservation tanks, and we finally had to say that there's a fee for a certain number of years' storage, and beyond that the price starts to escalate." It costs up to $1,200 a year to store frozen embryos. As of May 2012, there were about 600,000 frozen embryos stored in laboratories and fertility clinics, costing the donor families about $72 million annually for storage fees.

=== Donor screening ===
In the United States, donors must, if possible, be screened for a series of infectious diseases. The U.S. Food and Drug Administration (FDA) administers the rules for screening donors. If the donors are not available to be screened, the embryos must be given a label that indicates that the required screening has not been done, and the recipients must agree to accept the associated risk. The amount of screening the embryo has already undergone is largely dependent on the genetic parents' own IVF clinic and process. The embryo recipient may elect to have her own embryologist conduct further testing or donating them for use in embryonic stem cell research. Although embryos can, theoretically, survive indefinitely in frozen storage, as a practical reality someone must eventually decide on a permanent disposition for them.

A US study concluded that donating an embryo is approximately twice as cost-effective as oocyte donation in terms of cost per live birth, with a cost of $22,000 per live delivery compared to $41,000 for oocyte donation.

Embryo donation process in European countries is more cost effective compared to the US, especially in Cyprus where the success rates are higher.

=== Process ===
Embryo donation is legally considered a property transfer and not an adoption by state laws. However, Georgia enacted a statute called the "Option of Adoption Act" in 2009 which provided a procedure for, but (importantly) did not require—a confirmatory court order of parentage following embryo adoption. One advantage some embryo adoption couples in Georgia have derived from this law is that they have become eligible for the federal Adoption Tax Credit.

Embryo donation can be carried out as a service of an individual infertility clinic (where donor and recipient families typically live in the local area and are both patients of the same clinic) or by any of several national organizations. The process described below is typical of an "adoption-agency-based" national program.

Genetic parents entering an embryo adoption program are offered the benefits of selecting the adoptive parents from the agency's pool of prescreened applicants. Embryo ownership is transferred directly from the genetic parents to the adoptive parents. Genetic parents may be updated by the agency when a successful pregnancy is achieved and when a child or children is/are born. The genetic parents and adoptive parents may negotiate their own terms for future contact between the families.

Prospective adoptive parents entering a program complete an application, and may also complete a traditional adoption home study, fertility or adoption education, background and health checks and in some cases, depending on the requirements of both the home study and placement agencies, court certification of adoption eligibility. Their completed paperwork and fees are submitted to the placement agency, which reviews their file. Some agencies allow the donors to choose the recipient while others match the recipient parents with similar preferences including desired level of openness post-adoption. Genetic and prospective parents are then given the chance to approve the match. Once all parties agree, the embryo is transferred to the adoptive mother's clinic for a frozen embryo transfer.

None of the procedures involved with embryo adoption by either the genetic or adopting parents are legal requirements of embryo transfer. The process is entered into willingly by both sets of parents because of the added safeguards, knowledge and communication offered to both parties by the system.

==== Notable births and media coverage ====
Embryo adoption received renewed international attention in 2025 following the birth of Thaddeus Pierce in Ohio. His parents, Lindsey and Tim Pierce, received embryos originally cryopreserved in 1994. The child's birth followed approximately 31 years of embryo storage, which the treating physician described as a record.

The embryos had been provided by Linda Archerd, who sought a family through the Snowflakes® program. According to the Associated Press, Archerd wanted to participate in choosing the recipient family and to maintain a relationship with the child. The case attracted attention both for the duration of embryo cryopreservation and for the role of open embryo donation in connecting genetic and recipient families.

The birth illustrated the possibilities and complexities associated with long-term embryo storage, including locating historical medical records, transporting embryos between clinics, and arranging transfers of embryos created using older laboratory techniques. The Snowflakes® program's involvement was reported as part of broader discussion about the future of stored embryos and the choices available to families undergoing fertility treatment.

==== Public policy and federal involvement ====
Embryo adoption became part of American political debate over embryonic stem-cell research during the administration of President George W. Bush. Children born through embryo adoption programs, including Snowflakes®, were presented by supporters as examples of alternatives to the destruction of stored embryos. A 2007 White House policy document discussed embryo adoption as an alternative to using embryos in research.

Federal support for embryo adoption awareness continued in later years. In September 2026, the United States Department of Health and Human Services recorded a $920,000 award to Nightlight Christian Adoptions and the National Embryo Donation Center for an embryo adoption awareness campaign. According to the federal award description, the project sought to increase awareness of embryo donation and placement, expand access to participating medical professionals, and provide education and counseling concerning family communication and disclosure.

==== Ethical, legal, and religious debates ====
Embryo Adoption is often associated with a Christian understanding of the moral status of human embryos. Its adoption-based terminology reflects the belief that embryos should be treated as human lives deserving protection. This approach has also generated debate over whether embryo donation should be understood as adoption or as a form of assisted reproductive treatment.

In a 2002 article in the Scottish Journal of Theology, theologian John Berkman examined a case of open embryo adoption arranged by a Christian adoption agency. Berkman concluded that embryo adoption could be morally appropriate in some circumstances while identifying ethical concerns with the particular case under examination.

A 2011 review published in the International Journal of Law, Policy and the Family examined competing understandings of embryo relinquishment as either donation or adoption. The authors advocated an approach that recognized differing preferences among patients and the importance of access to information about genetic origins.

The terminology remains controversial because embryo transfers generally do not constitute legal adoptions under American family law. In a 2025 investigation, The Guardian described the role of Snowflakes® and similar programs in wider debates concerning reproductive technology, embryo personhood, and Christian opposition to embryo destruction. The report also discussed tensions between support for embryo adoption and opposition to some practices associated with IVF.

==== Embryo matching and family relationships ====
Embryo adoption differs from some anonymous embryo donation arrangements by facilitating the exchange of information and the possibility of continuing contact between families. Embryo providers may participate in choosing recipient families, and arrangements may include communication before and after the birth of children. The extent of contact depends on the preferences and agreements of the participants.

Researchers have examined the motivations of families who use this model. A 2010 qualitative study published in Families, Systems, & Health investigated the experiences of couples relinquishing frozen embryos through a Christian embryo adoption agency. The study considered the emotional and practical issues involved in transferring embryos to other families.

A subsequent study by Lucy Frith, Eric Blyth, Marilyn Paul, and Roni Berger, published in Human Reproduction in 2011, examined the experiences of 43 participants who had relinquished embryos through the Snowflakes® embryo adoption program. Researchers found that participants' decisions were influenced by their views of embryos, dissatisfaction with other disposition options, feelings of parental responsibility, and interest in maintaining varying degrees of openness with recipient families.

==== Academic research on Embryo Adoption families ====
Embryo adoption has been the subject of research in reproductive medicine, family studies, and anthropology. In a 2011 article in American Ethnologist, anthropologists Chantal Collard and Shireen Kashmeri examined relationships among children and families participating in the Snowflakes® embryo adoption program. Their research explored the significance of genetic siblings, including siblings born to different recipient families, and the ways participants negotiated biological and social relationships.

Collard and Kashmeri also published an ethnographic study in 2009 examining the ethical and kinship considerations of embryo donation among Snowflakes participants in California. The researchers considered how genetic and recipient families understood their responsibilities and the relationships created through embryo placement.

In 2017, Frith, Blyth, and Steve Lui published a mixed-methods study specifically examining relationships and contact arrangements among Snowflakes embryo providers and recipients. The research included an online survey and follow-up interviews. Participants generally described contact arrangements positively, although the researchers also identified challenges associated with negotiating relationships between genetic and recipient families. The authors suggested that counseling or other ongoing support could help families manage these relationships.

== See also ==
- Assisted reproductive technology
