= 2014 Thai surrogacy controversy =

Controversy in Thailand and Australia

External videos
- Tara Brown's interview with David and Wendy Farnell, 60 Minutes Australia

In July 2014, a Thai woman, Pattaramon Chanbua, sought to raise money for her critically-ill surrogate son, Gammy. She had been hired as a surrogate mother by an Australian couple, David John Farnell and Wenyu Wendy Li, and the child had been in her care since December 2013, when Farnell and Li left Thailand with baby Gammy's twin sister, Pipah.

Chanbua claimed that when ultrasound results seven months into the surrogate pregnancy indicated that Chanbua was carrying twins and that one of the twins, a boy, had Down syndrome, Farnell and Li requested that she abort him, and that they would keep only the child's twin sister. Chanbua claimed she refused, citing her Buddhist beliefs, and instead opted to raise the boy (named Gammy) on her own. Farnell and Li claimed that they were only told about Pipah, the twin sister. The Farnells returned to Australia in December 2013, bringing Pipah with them.

After the story broke to media, donors amassed a fund of more than A$250,000 to help Gammy.

The incident raised questions about the ethics of gestational surrogacy. The fact that David Farnell is a convicted sex offender (he was sentenced to three years in prison in 1997 for molesting two girls aged seven and ten) has also caused controversy. There were also rumours that the Farnells believed that Gammy had died, but this was not true; it was David Farnell's adult daughter from his first marriage who claimed that Gammy died and she did so because she thought it would be easier to explain it to her friends.

In response to the controversy, Thai authorities reportedly banned surrogate babies from leaving the country with their parents. Hundreds of foreign couples were reported to have been affected. A law was also drafted making commercial surrogacy a criminal offence in Thailand.

Since July 30 2015, Thailand has banned foreigners from commercial surrogacy contract arrangements, under the Protection of Children Born from Assisted Reproductive Technologies Act. Only opposite-sex married couples as residents of Thailand are allowed to have a commercial surrogacy contract arrangement. In the past, Thailand was a popular destination for fertility tourism.

A charity involved in the case has stated that David Farnell has tried to access the funds raised for Gammy. However, an inquest into Farnell and Li's contact with his daughter by Australian authorities found that there was no evidence to suggest Farnell ever attempted to access the funds set aside for Gammy. Additionally, it was found Farnell and Li had attempted to bring Gammy home, but the surrogate mother initially had objections and had intended to adopt Gammy without Farnell and Li, so they had left Gammy behind in a mix-up of cultural and language barriers.

It was ruled that Pipah was not allowed to be alone with David Farnell, and with the agreement that she must be read a photobook with age-appropriate language every three months for the foreseeable future that explained her father's offences.

Gammy was later granted Australian citizenship on Chanbua's application on the basis that Gammy's biological father was Australian.

David Farnell died in July 2020, reportedly from an asbestos-related illness.

== See also ==
- Google Baby (de)
