= Sperm donation =

Method of assisted reproduction

Sperm donation is the provision by a man of his sperm for the artificial insemination or other "fertility treatment" of one or more females who are not his sexual partners in order that they may become pregnant by him. Where pregnancies go to full term, the sperm donor will be the biological father of every baby born from his donations. The man is known as a sperm donor and the sperm he provides is known as "donor sperm" because the intention is that the man will give up all legal rights to any child produced from the sperm and will not be the legal father. Sperm donation may also be known as "semen donation".

Sperm donation should be distinguished from "shared parenthood" where the man who provides the sperm used to conceive a baby agrees to participate in the child's upbringing. Where a sperm donor provides his sperm in order for it to be used to father a child for a female with whom they have little or no further contact, it is a form of third party reproduction.

Sperm may be donated by the donor directly to the intended recipient or through a sperm bank or fertility clinic. Pregnancies are usually achieved by using donor sperm in assisted reproductive technology (ART) techniques which include artificial insemination (either by intracervical insemination (ICI) or intrauterine insemination (IUI) in a clinic, or intravaginal insemination at home). Less commonly, donor sperm may be used for in vitro fertilization (IVF). See also "natural insemination" below. The primary recipients of donor sperm are single women and lesbian couples, but the process may also be useful to heterosexual couples with male infertility.

Donor sperm and "fertility treatments" using donor sperm may be obtained at a sperm bank or fertility clinic. Sperm banks or clinics may be subject to state or professional regulations, including restrictions on donor anonymity and the number of offspring that may be produced, and there may be other legal protections of the rights and responsibilities of both recipient and donor. Some sperm banks, either by choice or regulation, limit the amount of information available to potential recipients; a desire to obtain more information on donors is one reason why recipients may choose to use a known donor or private donation (i.e. a de-identified donor).

== Laws ==
A sperm donor is generally not intended to be the legal or de jure father of a child produced from their sperm. The law may however, make implications in relation to legal fatherhood or the absence of a father. The law may also govern the fertility process through sperm donation in a fertility clinic. It may make provision as to whether a sperm donor may be anonymous or not, and it might give an adult donor conceived offspring the right to trace their biological father.

In the past, it was considered that the method of insemination was crucial to determining the legal responsibility of the male as the father. A recent case (see below 'Natural Insemination') has held that it is the purpose, rather than the method of insemination which will determine responsibility. Laws regulating sperm donation address issues such as permissible reimbursement or payment to sperm donors, rights and responsibilities of the donor towards their biological offspring, the child's right to know their father's identity, and procedural issues. Laws vary greatly from jurisdiction to jurisdiction. In general, laws are more likely to disregard the sperm donor's biological link to the child, so that they will neither have child support obligations nor rights to the child. In the absence of specific legal protection, courts may order a sperm donor to pay child support or recognize their parental rights, and will invariably do so where the insemination is carried out by natural, as opposed to artificial means.

Laws in many jurisdictions limit the number of offspring that a sperm donor can give rise to, and who may be a recipient of donor sperm.

=== Lawsuit over donor qualification ===
In 2017, a lawsuit was brought in U.S. District Court for the Northern District of Illinois regarding autism diagnoses among multiple offspring of Donor-H898. The suit asserts that false information was presented regarding a donor who should not have been considered an appropriate candidate for a sperm donation program because of a diagnosis of ADHD. Reportedly, the situation is being studied by some of the world's foremost experts in the genetics of autism because of the numbers of his offspring being diagnosed with autism.

== Uses ==
The purpose of sperm donation is to provide pregnancies for women whose male partner is infertile or, more commonly, for women who do not have a male partner. The development of fertility medicine such as ICSI has enabled more and more heterosexual couples to produce their own children without the use of third-party gametes which has reduced the demand for sperm donation from this social group. However, at the same time, social attitudes and the social/legal framework has changed in that single women and female couples can more easily have their own biological families and do so with the aid of sperm donation. Increasingly, single women and female couples form the highest percentage of those using sperm donors in order to have a baby. Some fertility centers offering sperm donation do so exclusively for these two groups of women.

Donor sperm is prepared for use in artificial insemination in intrauterine insemination (IUI) or intra-cervical insemination (ICI). In most situations, the majority of people seeking sperm donation, being either single or women in a lesbian partnership, do not themselves have "fertility issues" in greater proportion to the rest of the female population although donor sperm is often prepared for use in other assisted reproductive techniques such as IVF and intracytoplasmic sperm injection (ICSI). Sperm banks and fertility clinics often offer, for example, donor sperm for use in IVF to facilitate treatments in which one lesbian partner will produce an egg which is fertilised by sperm from a donor, and the egg is then inserted into the other partner. A variation of this is when each partner carries the fertilised egg of the other, usually fertilised by sperm from the same donor, and often where the pregnancies run simultaneously. Donor sperm may be used in surrogacy arrangements either by artificially inseminating the surrogate (known as traditional surrogacy) or by implanting in a surrogate embryos which have been created by using donor sperm together with eggs from a donor or from the 'commissioning female' (known as gestational surrogacy).

Procedures of any kind (e.g., artificial insemination or IVF) using donor sperm to impregnate a female who is not the partner of, nor related to the male who provided the sperm, may be referred to as "donor treatments".

== Provision ==
A sperm donor may donate sperm privately or through a sperm bank, sperm agency, or other brokerage arrangement. Donations from private donors are most commonly carried out using artificial insemination.

Generally, a male who provides sperm as a sperm donor gives up all legal and other rights over the biological children produced from his sperm.

Donors may or may not be paid, according to local laws and agreed arrangements. Even in unpaid arrangements, expenses are often reimbursed. Depending on local law and on private arrangements, men may donate anonymously or agree to provide identifying information to their offspring in the future. Private donations facilitated by an agency often use a "directed" donor, when a male directs that his sperm is to be used by a specific person. Non-anonymous donors are also called "known donors", "open donors" or "identity disclosure donors".

A review of surveys among donors came to the results that the media and advertising are most efficient in attracting donors, and that the internet is becoming increasingly important in this purpose. Recruitment via couples with infertility problems in the social environment of the sperm donor does not seem to be important in recruitment overall.

=== Sperm banks ===
A sperm donor will usually donate sperm to a sperm bank under a contract, which typically specifies the period during which the donor will be required to produce sperm, which generally ranges from six to 24 months depending on the number of pregnancies which the sperm bank intends to produce from the donor. If a sperm bank has access to world markets by direct sales, or sales to clinics outside their own jurisdiction, a man may donate sperm for a longer period than two years, as the risk of consanguinity is substantially reduced and a sperm bank will have to adhere to local laws, although these may vary widely.

The contract may also specify the place and hours for donation, a requirement to notify the sperm bank in the case of acquiring a sexual infection, and the requirement not to have intercourse or to masturbate for a period of usually two–three days before making a donation.

Sperm provided by a sperm bank will be produced by a donor attending at the sperm bank's premises in order to ascertain the donor's identity on every occasion. The donor masturbates to provide ejaculate or by the use of an electrical stimulator, although a special condom, known as a collection condom, may be used to collect the semen during sexual intercourse. The ejaculate is collected in a small container, which is usually extended with chemicals in order to provide a number of vials, each of which would be used for separate inseminations. The sperm is frozen and quarantined, usually for a period of six months, and the donor is re-tested prior to the sperm being used for artificial insemination.

=== Sperm agencies ===
In some jurisdictions, sperm may be donated through an agency. The agency may recruit donors, usually via the Internet. Donors may undergo the same kind of checks and tests required by a sperm bank, although clinics and agencies are not necessarily subject to the same regulatory regimes. In the case of an agency, the sperm will be supplied to the recipient female fresh rather than frozen.

Sperm agencies are largely unregulated and, because the sperm is not quarantined, may carry sexually transmitted diseases. This lack of regulation has led to authorities in some jurisdictions bringing legal action against sperm agencies. Agencies typically insist on STI testing for donors, but such tests cannot detect recent infections. Donors providing sperm in this way may not be protected by laws which apply to donations through a sperm bank or fertility clinic and will, if traced, be regarded as the legal father of each child produced.

=== Private or "directed" donations ===
Couples or individuals who need insemination by a third-party may seek assistance privately and directly from a friend or family member, or may obtain a "private" or "directed" donation by advertising or through a broker. A number of web sites seek to link recipients with sperm donors, while advertisements in gay and lesbian publications are common.

Private donations may be free of charge — avoiding the significant costs of a more medicalised insemination - and fresh rather than frozen semen is generally deemed to increase the chances of pregnancy. However, they also carry higher risks associated with unscreened sexual or body fluid contact. Legal treatment of donors varies across jurisdictions, and in most jurisdictions (e.g., Sweden) personal and directed donors lack legal safeguards that may be available to anonymous donors. However, the laws of some countries (e.g., New Zealand) recognize written agreements between donors and recipients in a similar way to donations through a sperm bank.

=== Natural insemination ===
Insemination through sexual intercourse is known as natural insemination (NI). Where natural insemination is carried out by a person who is not the woman's usual sexual partner, and in circumstances where the express intention is to secure a pregnancy, this may be referred to as "sperm donation by natural insemination".

Traditionally, a woman who becomes pregnant through natural insemination has always had a legal right to claim child support from the donor and the donor a legal right to the custody of the child. Conceiving through natural insemination is considered a natural process, so the biological father has also been seen as the legal and social father and was liable for child support and custody rights of the child.

The law therefore made a fine distinction based on the method of conception: the biological relationship between the father and the child and the reason for the pregnancy having been achieved will be the same whether the child was conceived naturally or by artificial means, but the legal position has been different.

Many private sperm donors now offer both natural and artificial insemination, or they may offer natural insemination after attempts to achieve conception by artificial insemination have failed. Some sperm donors are influenced by the fact that a woman who is not the donor's usual sexual partner will carry his child whatever the means of conception, and that the actual method by which his sperm is introduced into the woman's body is of a lesser consideration than this fact. Women may seek natural insemination for various reasons including the desire by them for a "natural" conception.

Natural insemination by a donor usually avoids the need for costly medical procedures that may require the intervention of third parties. It may lack some of the safety precautions and screenings usually built into the artificial insemination process but proponents claim that it produces higher pregnancy rates.

NI is generally only carried out at the female's fertile time, as with other methods of insemination, in order to achieve the best chances of a pregnancy.

== Sperm bank processes ==
A sperm donor is usually advised not to ejaculate for two to three days before providing the sample, to increase sperm count. A sperm donor produces and collects sperm at a sperm bank or clinic by masturbation or during sexual intercourse with the use of a collection condom.

=== Preparing the sperm ===
Sperm banks and clinics may "wash" the sperm sample to extract sperm from the rest of the material in the semen. Unwashed semen may only be used for ICI (intra-cervical) inseminations, to avoid cramping, or for IVF/ICSI procedures. It may be washed after thawing for use in IUI procedures. A cryoprotectant semen extender is added if the sperm is to be placed in frozen storage in liquid nitrogen, and the sample is then frozen in a number of vials or straws. One sample will be divided into one–twenty vials or straws depending on the quantity of the ejaculate, whether the sample is washed or unwashed, or whether it is being prepared for IVF use. Following analysis of an individual donor's sperm, straws or vials may be prepared which contain differing amounts of motile sperm post-thaw. The number of sperm in a straw prepared for IVF use, for example, will be significantly less than the number of motile sperm in a straw prepared for ICI or IUI and there will therefore be more IVF straws per ejaculate. Following the necessary quarantine period, the samples are thawed and used to inseminate women through artificial insemination or other ART treatments.

=== Medical issues ===
==== Screening ====
Sperm banks typically screen potential donors for genetic diseases, chromosomal abnormalities and sexually transmitted infections that may be transmitted through sperm. The screening procedure generally also includes a quarantine period, in which the samples are frozen and stored for at least six months after which the donor will be re-tested for sexually transmitted diseases (STIs). This is to ensure no new infections have been acquired or have developed during the period of donation. Providing the result is negative, the sperm samples can be released from quarantine and used in treatments. Children conceived through sperm donation have a birth defect rate of almost a fifth compared to the general population.

==== Samples required per donor offspring ====
The number of donor samples (ejaculates) that is required to help give rise to a child varies substantially from donor to donor, as well as from clinic to clinic. However, the following equations generalize the main factors involved:

For intracervical insemination:

$$N = \frac{V_s \times c \times r_s}{n_r}$$

Approximate pregnancy rate (r_{s}) varies with amount of sperm used in a cycle (n_{r}). Values are for intrauterine insemination, with sperm number in total sperm count, which may be approximately twice the total motile sperm count. (Old data, rates are likely higher today.)

N is how many children a single sample can help give rise to.
V_{s} is the volume of a sample (ejaculate), usually between 1.0 mL and 6.5 mL
c is the concentration of motile sperm in a sample after freezing and thawing, approximately 5-20 million per ml but varies substantially
r_{s} is the pregnancy rate per cycle, between 10% and 35%
n_{r} is the total motile sperm count recommended for vaginal insemination (VI) or intra-cervical insemination (ICI), approximately 20 million pr. ml.

The pregnancy rate increases with increasing number of motile sperm used, but only up to a certain degree, when other factors become limiting instead.

With these numbers, one sample would on average help giving rise to 0.1–0.6 children, that is, it actually takes on average two to five samples to make a child.

For intrauterine insemination, a centrifugation fraction (f_{c}) may be added to the equation:

f_{c} is the fraction of the volume that remains after centrifugation of the sample, which may be about half (0.5) to a third (0.33).

$$N = \frac{V_s \times f_c \times c \times r_s}{n_r}$$

Only five million motile sperm may be needed per cycle with IUI (n_{r}=5 million)

Thus, only one to three samples may be needed for a child, if used for IUI.

Using ART treatments such as IVF can result in one donor sample (or ejaculate) producing on average considerably more than one birth. However, the actual number of births per sample will depend on the actual ART method used, the age and medical condition of the female bearing the child, and the quality of the embryos produced by fertilization. Donor sperm is less commonly used for IVF treatments than for artificial insemination. This is because IVF treatments are usually required only when there is a problem with the female conceiving, or where there is a 'male factor problem' involving the female's partner. Donor sperm is also used for IVF in surrogacy arrangements where an embryo may be created in an IVF procedure using donor sperm and this is then implanted in a surrogate. In a case where IVF treatments are employed using donor sperm, surplus embryos may be donated to other women or couples and used in embryo transfer procedures. When donor sperm is used for IVF treatments, there is a risk that large numbers of children will be born from a single donor since a single ejaculate may produce up to 20 straws for IVF use. A single straw can fertilise a number of eggs and these can have a 40% to 50% pregnancy rate. 'Spare' embryos from donor treatments are frequently donated to other women or couples. Many sperm banks therefore limit the amount of semen from each donor which is prepared for IVF use, or they may restrict the period of time for which such a donor donates his sperm to perhaps as little as three months (about nine or ten ejaculates).

=== Choosing donors ===
==== Information about donor ====
In the US, sperm banks maintain lists or catalogs of donors which provide basic information such as racial origin, skin color, height, weight, color of eyes, and blood group. Some of these catalogs are available via the Internet, while others are only made available to patients when they apply for treatment. Some sperm banks make additional information about each donor available for an additional fee, and others make additional basic information known to children produced from donors when those children reach the age of eighteen. Some clinics offer "exclusive donors" whose sperm is only used to produce pregnancies for one recipient female. How accurate this is, or can be, is not known, and neither is it known whether the information produced by sperm banks, or by the donors themselves, is true. Many sperm banks will, however, carry out checks to verify the information requested, such as checking the identity of the donor and contacting his own doctor to verify medical details.

In the UK, most donors are anonymous at the point of donation and recipients can only see non-identifying information about their donor (e.g., height, weight, ethnicity, etc.). Donors need to provide identifying information to the clinic and clinics will usually ask the donor's GP to confirm any medical details they have been given. Donors are asked to provide a pen portrait of themselves which is held by the HFEA and can be obtained by the adult conceived from the donation at the age of 16, along with identifying information such as the donor's name and last known address at 18. Known donation is permitted and it is not uncommon for family or friends to donate to a recipient couple.

Qualities that potential recipients typically prefer in donors include the donors being tall, college educated, and with a consistently high sperm count. A review came to the result that 68% of donors had given information to the clinical staff regarding physical characteristics and education but only 16% had provided additional information such as hereditary aptitudes and temperament or character.

==== Other screening criteria ====
Sexually active gay men are prohibited or discouraged from donating in some countries, including the US. Sperm banks also screen out some potential donors based on height, baldness, and family medical history.

=== Number of offspring ===
Where a donor donates sperm through a sperm bank, the sperm bank will generally undertake a number of checks to ensure that the donor produces sperm of sufficient quantity and quality and that the donor is healthy and will not pass diseases through the use of his sperm. The donor's sperm must also withstand the freezing and thawing process necessary to store and quarantine the sperm. The cost to the sperm bank for such tests is considerable, which normally means that clinics may use the same donor to produce a number of pregnancies in multiple women. The number of children permitted from a single donor varies by law and practice. These laws are designed to protect the children produced by sperm donation as well as the donor's natural children from consanguinity in later life: they are not intended to protect the donor himself and those donating sperm will be aware that their donations may give rise to numerous pregnancies in different jurisdictions. Such laws, where they exist, vary from jurisdiction to jurisdiction, and a sperm bank may also impose its own limits. The latter will be based on the reports of pregnancies which the sperm bank receives, although this relies upon the accuracy of the returns and the actual number of pregnancies may therefore be somewhat higher. Nevertheless, sperm banks frequently impose a lower limit on geographical numbers than some jurisdictions and may also limit the overall number of pregnancies permitted from a single donor. The limitation on the number of children which a donor's sperm may give rise to is usually expressed in terms of 'families', on the expectation that children within the family are prohibited from sexual relations under incest laws. In effect, the term family means a "woman" and usually includes the donor's partner or ex-partner, so that multiple donations to the same woman are not counted in the limit. The limits usually apply within one jurisdiction, so that donor sperm may be used in other jurisdictions. Where a woman has had a child by a particular donor, there is usually no limit on the number of subsequent pregnancies which that woman may have by that same donor.

There is no limit to the number of offspring which may be produced from private donors.

Despite laws limiting the number of offspring, some donors may produce substantial numbers of children, particularly where they donate through different clinics, where sperm is onsold or is exported to different jurisdictions, and where countries or jurisdictions do not have a central register of donors.

In the media, there have been reports of some donors producing anywhere from over 40 offspring to several hundred or in one case, possibly over 1000.

==== Siblings ====
Where a female wishes to conceive additional children by sperm donation, she will often wish to use the same donor. The advantage of having subsequent children by the same donor is that these will be full biological siblings, having the same biological father and mother. Many sperm banks offer a service of storing sperm for future pregnancies, but few will otherwise guarantee that sperm from the original donor will be available.

Since 2000, donor conceived people have been locating their biological siblings and even their donor through web services such as the Donor Sibling Registry as well as DNA testing services such as Ancestry.com and 23andMe. By using these services, donors can find offspring despite the fact that they may have donated anonymously.

=== Donor payment ===
The majority of donors who donate through a sperm bank receive some form of payment, although this is rarely a significant amount. A review including 29 studies from nine countries found that the amount of money donors received varied from $10 to €70 per donation or sample. The payments vary from the situation in the United Kingdom where donors are only entitled to their expenses, to the situation with some US sperm banks where a donor receives a set fee for each donation plus an additional amount for each vial stored. At one prominent California sperm bank for example, TSBC, donors receive roughly $50 for each donation which has acceptable motility/survival rates both at donation and at a test-thaw a couple of days later. Because of the requirement for the two-day abstinence period before donation, and geographical factors which usually require the donor to travel, it is not a viable way to earn a significant income. Some private donors may seek remuneration although others donate for altruistic reasons. According to the EU Tissue Directive donors in EU may only receive compensation, which is strictly limited to making good the expenses and inconveniences related to the donation.

=== Onselling ===
There is a market for vials of processed sperm and for various reasons a sperm bank may sell-on stocks of vials which it holds (known as "onselling"). Onselling enables a sperm bank to maximize the sale and disposal of sperm samples which it has processed. The reasons for onselling may be where part of, or even the main business of, a particular sperm bank is to process and store sperm rather than to use it in fertility treatments, or where a sperm bank is able to collect and store more sperm than it can use within nationally set limits. In the latter case, a sperm bank may sell on sperm from a particular donor for use in another jurisdiction after the number of pregnancies achieved from that donor has reached its national maximum.

== Psychological issues ==
=== Informing the child ===
Many donees do not inform the child that they were conceived through sperm donation, or, when non-anonymous donor sperm has been used, they do not tell the child until they are old enough for the clinic to provide contact information about the donor. Some believe that it is a human right for a person to know who their biological mother and father are, and thus it should be illegal to conceal this information in any way and at any time. For donor conceived children who find out after a long period of secrecy, their main grief is usually not the fact that they are not the genetic child of the couple who have raised them, but the fact that the parent(s) has/have kept information from or lied to them, causing loss of trust.

There are certain circumstances where the child very likely should be told:

- When many relatives know about the insemination, so that the child might find it out from somebody else.
- When the adoptive father carries a significant genetic disease, relieving the child from fear of being a carrier.

The parents' decision-making process of telling the child is influenced by many intrapersonal factors (such as personal confidence), interpersonal factors, as well as social and family life cycle factors. For example, health care staff and support groups have been demonstrated to influence the decision to disclose the procedure. The appropriate age of the child at disclosure is most commonly given at between seven and eleven years.

Single mothers and lesbian couples are more likely to disclose from a young age. Donor conceived children in heterosexual coupled families are more likely to find out about their disclosure from a third party.

=== Families sharing same donor ===
Having contact and meeting among families sharing the same donor generally has positive effects. It gives the child an extended family and helps give the child a sense of identity by answering questions about the donor. It is more common among open identity-families headed by single men/women. Less than 1% of those seeking donor-siblings find it a negative experience, and in such cases it is mostly where the parents have disagreed with each other about how the relationship should proceed.

=== Other family members ===
Parents of donors, who are the grandparents of donor offspring and may therefore be the oldest surviving progenitors, may regard the donated genetic contribution as a family asset, and may regard the donor conceived people as their grandchildren.

A review came to the result that a minority of actual donors involved their partner in the decision-making process of becoming a donor. In one study, 25% of donors felt they needed permission from their partner. In another study, however, 37% of donors with a partner did not approve of a consent form for partners and rather felt that donors should make their own decisions. In a Swedish study, donors reported either enthusiastic or neutral responses from their partners concerning sperm donation.

It is considered common for donors to not tell their spouses that they are or have been sperm donors.

Within heterosexual couples, many men report resisting or having difficulty accepting sperm donation from another man, as it is often viewed as being akin to being cuckolded.

=== Mother–child relation ===
Studies have indicated that donor insemination mothers show greater emotional involvement with their child, and they enjoy motherhood more than mothers by natural conception and adoption. Compared to mothers by natural conception, donor insemination mothers tend to show higher levels of disciplinary aggression.

Studies have indicated that donor insemination fathers express more warmth and emotional involvement than fathers by natural conception and adoption, enjoy fatherhood more, and are less involved in disciplining their adolescent. Some donor insemination parents become overly involved with their children.

Adolescents born through sperm donation to lesbian mothers have reported themselves to be academically successful, with active friendship networks, strong family bonds, and overall high ratings of well-being. It is estimated that over 80% of adolescents feel they can confide in their mothers, and almost all regard their mothers to be good role models.

=== Motivation vs reluctance to donate ===
A systematic review came to the result that altruism and financial compensation are the main motivations to donate, and to a lesser degree procreation or genetic fatherhood and questions about the donor's own fertility. Financial compensation is generally more prevalent than altruism as a motivation among donors in countries where the compensation is large, which is largely explained by a larger number of economically driven people becoming donors in such countries. Among men who do not donate, the main reason thereof has been stated to be a lack of motivation rather than concerns about the donation.

Reluctance to donate may be caused by a sense of ownership and responsibility for the well-being of the offspring.

=== Support for donors ===
In the UK, the National Gamete Donation Trust is a charity which provides information, advice and support for people wishing to become egg, sperm or embryo donors. The Trust runs a national helpline and online discussion list for donors to talk to each other.

In one Danish study, 40% of donors felt happy thinking about possible offspring, but 40% of donors sometimes worried about the future of resulting offspring.

A review came to the result that one in three actual donors would like counselling to address certain implications of their donation, expecting that counselling could help them to give their decision some thought and to look at all the involved parties in the donation.

A systematic review in 2012 came to the conclusion that the psychosocial needs and experiences of the donors, and their follow-up and counselling are largely neglected in studies on sperm donation.

== Ethical and legal issues ==
=== Anonymity ===
Anonymous sperm donation occurs under the condition that recipients and offspring will never learn the identity of the donor. A non-anonymous donor, however, will disclose his identity to recipients. A donor who makes a non-anonymous sperm donation is termed a known donor, an open identity donor, or an identity release donor.

Non-anonymous sperm donors are, to a substantially higher degree, driven by altruistic motives for their donations.

Even in the case of anonymous donation, some information about the donor may be released to recipients at the time of treatment. Limited donor information includes height, weight, eye, skin and hair colour. In Sweden, this is the extent of disclosed information. In the US, however, additional information may be given, such as a comprehensive biography and sound/video samples.

Several jurisdictions (e.g., Sweden, Norway, the Netherlands, Britain, Switzerland, Australia and New Zealand, etc.) only allow non-anonymous sperm donation. This is generally based on the principle that a child has a right to know his or her biological origins. In 2013, a German court precedent was set based on a case brought by a 21-year-old woman. Generally, these jurisdictions require sperm banks to keep up-to-date records and to release identifying information about the donor to his offspring after they reach a certain age (15–18). See Sperm donation laws by country.

The popularity of personal DNA testing has brought into question the possibility of assuring a donor's anonymity. Even sperm donors who have chosen anonymity and not to contact their offspring through a registry are increasingly being traced by their children. It has become relatively easy to identify one's sperm donor using inexpensive testing services and their databases. Even DNA matches at a third or fourth cousin level can provide clues which enable one to identify their biological father. It has become common practice for people who were conceived via an anonymous sperm donor to ascertain who their biological father is via this method. For example, at least one child found his biological father using his own DNA test and internet research and was able to identify and contact his anonymous donor.

==== Attitudes towards anonymity ====
For most sperm recipients, anonymity of the donor is not of major importance at the obtainment or tryer-stage. Anonymous sperm is often less expensive. Another reason that recipients choose anonymous donors is concern about the role that the donor or the child may want the donor to play in the child's life or potential legal claims to parenthood. These fears were especially strong for lesbian couples wishing to conceive using a sperm donor prior to legalization of gay marriage or second parent adoptions in their area, because they worried that the sperm donor would be legally viewed as having greater claim to parenthood than the non-biological "social parent" of the child, particularly in the cases of the death of the legal parent or in a separation. Sperm recipients may prefer a non-anonymous donor if they anticipate disclosing donor conception to their child and anticipate the child's desire to seek more information about their donor in the future. A Dutch study found that lesbian couples are significantly more likely (98%) to choose non-anonymous donors than heterosexual couples (63%). Of the heterosexual couples that opted for anonymous donation, 83% intended never to inform their child of their conception via sperm donation.

For children conceived by an anonymous donor, the impossibility of contacting a biological father or the inability to find information about him can potentially be psychologically burdensome. One study estimated that approximately 67% of adolescent donor conceived children with an identity-release donor plan to contact him when they turn 18.

Some people point out that parents who opt to use a sperm donor to conceive rather than adopting children do so because they value a biological connection to their children. At the same time, because the donation is anonymous they deny their children the opportunity to connect with half of their biological tree. This can be viewed as hypocritical of the parents, and is an argument against anonymity for donors.

===== Among donors and potential donors =====
Among donors, a systematic review of 29 studies from nine countries concluded that 20–50% of donors would still be willing to donate even if anonymity could not be guaranteed. Between 40 and 97% of donors agree to release non-identifying information such as physical characteristics and level of education. The proportion of actual donors wishing for contact with their offspring varies between 10 and 88%. One study reported that most donors are not open to contact with offspring, although more open attitudes are observed among single and homosexual donors; conversely another anonymous study of American donors noted that 88% were open to contact with offspring. About half of donors feel that degree of involvement should be decided by the intended parents. Some of the donors prefer contact with offspring in a non-visible way, such as where the child can ask questions but the donor will not reveal his identity. One study recruited donors through the Donor Sibling Registry who wanted contact with offspring or who had already made contact with offspring. It resulted that none of the donors said that there was "no relationship", a third of donors felt it was a special relationship, almost like a very good friend, and a quarter felt it was merely a genetic bond and nothing more. Fifteen percent of actual donors considered offspring to be "their own children". On the whole, donors feel that the first step towards contact should come from offspring rather than parents or the donor himself. Some even say that it is the moral responsibility of the donor not to seek contact with offspring.

The same review indicated that up to 37% of donors reported changes in their attitude towards anonymity before and after donation, with one in four being prepared to be more open about themselves after the donation than before (as a "potential donor"). Among potential donors, 30–46% of potential donors would still be willing to donate even if anonymity could not be guaranteed. Still, more than 75% of these potential donors felt positive towards releasing non-identifying information to offspring, such as physical characteristics and level of education. Single or homosexual men are significantly more inclined to release their identity than married, heterosexual men. Potential donors with children are less inclined to want to meet offspring than potential donors without children (9 versus 30% in the review). Potential donors in a relationship are less inclined to consider contact with offspring than single potential donors (7 versus 28% in the review). From US data, 20% would actively want to know and meet offspring and 40% would not object if the child wished to meet but would not solicit a meeting themselves. From Swedish data, where only non-anonymous donation is permitted in clinics, 87% of potential donors had a positive attitude towards future contact with offspring, although 80% of these potential donors did not feel that the donor had any moral responsibilities for the child later in life. Also from UK data, 80% of potential donors did not feel responsible for whatever happened with their sperm after the donation. With variation between different studies, between 33% and 94% of potential donors want to know at least whether or not the donation resulted in offspring. Some of these potential donors merely wanted to know if a pregnancy had been achieved but did not want to know any specific information about the offspring (e.g. sex, date of birth). Other potential donors felt that knowing the outcome of the donation made the experience more meaningful. In comparison, a German study came to the result that 11% of donors actually asked about the outcome in the clinic where they donated.

An Australian study concluded that potential donors who would still be willing to donate without a guarantee of anonymity were not automatically more open to extended or intimate contact with offspring.

==== Donor tracking ====
Even when donors choose to be anonymous, offspring may still find ways to learn more about their biological origins. Registries and DNA databases have been developed for this purpose. Registries that help donor-conceived offspring identify half-siblings from other mothers also help avoid accidental incest in adulthood.

===== Tracking by registries =====
Offspring of anonymous donors may often have the ability to obtain their biological father's donor number from the fertility clinic or sperm bank used for their birth. They may then share their number on a registry. By finding shared donor numbers, offspring may find their genetic half-siblings. The donor may also find his number on a registry and choose to make contact with his offspring or otherwise reveal his identity.

=== Fertility tourism and international sperm markets ===
Different factors motivate individuals to seek sperm from outside their home state. For example, some jurisdictions do not allow unmarried women to receive donor sperm. Jurisdictional regulatory choices as well as cultural factors that discourage sperm donation have also led to international fertility tourism and sperm markets.

==== Sweden ====
When Sweden banned anonymous sperm donation in 1980, the number of active sperm donors dropped from approximately 200 to 30. Sweden now has an 18-month waiting list for donor sperm. At least 250 Swedish sperm recipients travel to Denmark annually for insemination. Some of this is also due to the fact that Denmark also allows single women to be inseminated.

==== United Kingdom ====
After the United Kingdom ended anonymous sperm donation in 2005, the numbers of sperm donors went up, reversing a three-year decline. However, there is still a shortage, and some doctors have suggested raising the limit of children per donor. Some UK clinics import sperm from Scandinavia.

Despite the shortage, sperm exports from the UK are legal and donors may remain anonymous in this context. However, the HFEA does impose safeguards on the export of sperm, such as that it must be exported to fertility clinics only and that the result of any treatment must be traceable. The number of pregnancies obtained from an individual donor in each country where his sperm is exported will be subject to any local or national rules which apply. In addition, UK sperm banks may apply their own global maximum for the number of pregnancies obtained in respect of each donor.

Since 2009, the import of sperm via registered clinics for use in the UK has been authorised by the HFEA. The sperm must have been processed, stored and quarantined in compliance with UK regulations. The donors have agreed to be identified when the children produced with their sperm reach the age of eighteen. The number of children produced from such donors in the UK will, of course, be subject to HFEA rules (i.e. currently a limit of ten families,) but the donors' sperm may be used worldwide in accordance with the clinic's own limit, subject to national or local limits which apply. By 2014 the UK was importing nearly 40% of its sperm requirements, up from 10% in 2005. In 2018 it was reported that almost half of the imported sperm into Britain came from Denmark (3,000 units).

==== Korea ====
Korean Bioethics Law prohibits selling and buying of sperm between clinics, and each donor may only help giving rise to a child to one single couple. It suffers from a shortage.

==== Canada ====
Canada prohibits payment for gamete donation beyond the reimbursement of expenses. Many Canadians import purchased sperm from the United States.

==== United States ====
The United States, which permits monetary compensation for sperm donors, has had an increase in sperm donors during the late 2000s recession.

=== Social controversy ===
The use of sperm donation is most common among single women and lesbians. Some sperm banks and fertility clinics, particularly in the US, Denmark and the UK, have a predominance of women being treated with donor sperm who come within these groups with some recording over 85% of recipients from these backgrounds. Many sperm banks and fertility clinics direct their main advertising towards these groups. Many, but not all, of the single women or trans-gender people who choose sperm donation may be LGBT+. This produces many ethical issues around the ideals of conventional parenting and has wider issues for society as a whole, including the issues of the role of men as parents, family support for children, and financial support for women with children.

The growth of sperm banks and fertility clinics, the use of sperm agencies and the availability of anonymous donor sperm have served to make sperm donation a more respectable, and therefore a more socially acceptable, procedure.

A 2009 study has indicated that both men and women view the use of donor sperm with more skepticism compared with the use of donor eggs, suggesting a unique underlying perception regarding the use of male donor gametes.

One item of research has suggested that donor children have a greater likelihood of substance abuse, mental illness and criminal behavior when grown. However, its motivation and credibility have been questioned.

Coming forward publicly with problems is difficult for donor-conceived people as these issues are very personal and a public statement may attract criticism. Additionally, it may upset their parents if they speak out. A website called Anonymous Us has been set up where they can post details of their experiences anonymously, on which there are many accounts of problems.

== Religious responses ==
There are a wide range of religious responses to sperm donation, with some religious thinkers entirely in support of the use of donor sperm for pregnancy, some who support its use under certain conditions, and some entirely against.

=== Catholicism ===
Catholicism officially opposes both the donation of sperm and the use of donor sperm on the basis that it compromises the sexual unity of the marital relationship and the idea "that the procreation of a human person be brought about as the fruit of the conjugal act specific to the love between spouses."

=== Eastern Orthodoxy ===
The Eastern (Greek) Orthodox Church allows for IUI using the husband's sperm, but does not accept IVF and other assisted reproductive techniques.

=== Protestantism ===
The Southern Baptist Convention holds that sperm donation from a third party violates the marital bond. The United Methodist Church supports a variety of reproductive strategies including sperm donation.

=== Latter-day Saints movement ===
The Church of Jesus Christ of Latter-day Saints, the largest sect within the movement, allows for artificial insemination. However, doing so with sperm from someone other than a wife's husband is officially discouraged, but not forbidden; leaving the matter up to individual judgement.

=== Islam ===
Gamete donation is still a controversial issue in Islam, scholars of Sunni and Shia have different fatwas about sperm donation. While Sunni scholars have forbidden the use of any third party in infertility treatment, Some Shia scholars have announced that it is halal under the mentioned prerequisites.

=== Judaism ===
Jewish thinkers hold a broad range of positions on sperm donation. Some Jewish communities are totally against sperm donation from donors that are not the husbands of the recipient, while others have approved the use of donor insemination in some form, while liberal communities accept it entirely.

== History ==
In 1884, Professor William Pancoast of Philadelphia's Jefferson Medical College performed an insemination on the wife of a sterile Quaker merchant, which may be the first insemination procedure that resulted in the birth of a child. Instead of taking the sperm from the husband, the professor chloroformed the woman, then let his medical students vote which one of among them was "best looking", with that elected one providing the sperm that was then syringed into her cervix. At the husband's request, his wife was never told how she became pregnant. As a result of this experiment, the merchant's wife gave birth to a son, who became the first known child by donor insemination. The case was not revealed until 1909, when a letter by Addison Davis Hard appeared in the American journal Medical World, highlighting the procedure.

Since then, a few doctors began to perform private donor insemination. Such procedures were regarded as intensely private, if not secret, by the parties involved. Records were usually not maintained so that donors could not be identified for paternity proceedings. Technology permitted the use of fresh sperm only, and it is thought that sperm largely came from the doctors and their male staff, although occasionally they would engage private donors who were able to donate on short notice on a regular basis.

In 1945, Mary Barton and others published an article in the British Medical Journal on sperm donation. Barton, a gynecologist, founded a clinic in London which offered artificial insemination using donor sperm for women whose husbands were infertile. This clinic helped conceive 1,500 babies of which Mary Barton's husband, Bertold Weisner, probably fathered about 600.

The first successful human pregnancy using frozen sperm was in 1953.

"Donor insemination remained virtually unknown to the public until 1954". In that year the first comprehensive account of the process was published in The British Medical Journal.

Donor insemination provoked heated public debate. In the United Kingdom, the Archbishop of Canterbury established the first in a long procession of commissions that, over the years, inquired into the practice. It was at first condemned by the Lambeth Conference, which recommended that it be made a criminal offence. A Parliamentary Commission agreed. In Italy, the Pope declared donor insemination a sin, and proposed that anyone using the procedure be sent to prison.

Sperm donation gained popularity in the 1980s and 1990s.

In many western countries, sperm donation is now a largely accepted procedure. In the US and elsewhere, there are a large number of sperm banks. A sperm bank in the US pioneered the use of on-line search catalogues for donor sperm, and these facilities are now widely available on the websites of sperm banks and fertility clinics.

Recent years have also seen sperm donation become relatively less popular among heterosexual couples, who now have access to more sophisticated fertility treatments, and more popular among single women and lesbian couples — whose access to the procedure is relatively new and still prohibited in some jurisdictions.

=== United States ===
In 1954, the Superior Court of Cook County, Illinois granted a husband a divorce because, regardless of the husband's consent, the woman's donor insemination constituted adultery, and that donor insemination was "contrary to public policy and good morals, and considered adultery on the mother's part." The ruling went on to say that, "A child so conceived, was born out of wedlock and therefore illegitimate. As such, it is the child of the mother, and the father has no rights or interest in said child."

However, the following year, Georgia became the first state to pass a statute legitimizing children conceived by donor insemination, on the condition that both the husband and wife consented in advance in writing to the procedure.

In 1973, the Commissioners on Uniform State Laws, and a year later, the American Bar Association, approved the Uniform Parentage Act. This act provides that if a wife is artificially inseminated with donor semen under a physician's supervision, and with her husband's consent, the husband is legally considered the natural father of the donor inseminated child. That law was followed by similar legislation in many states.

=== United Kingdom ===
In the United Kingdom, the Warnock Committee was formed in July 1982 to consider issues of sperm donation and assisted reproduction techniques. Donor insemination was already available in the UK through unregulated clinics such as BPAS. Many of these clinics had started to offer sperm donation before the widespread use of freezing techniques. "Fresh sperm" was donated to order by donors at the fertile times of patients requiring treatments. Commonly, infertility of a male partner or sterilisation was a reason for treatment. Donations were anonymous and unregulated.

The Warnock Committee's report was published on July 18, 1984. and led to the passing of the Human Fertilisation and Embryology Act 1990. That act provided for a system of licensing for fertility clinics and procedures. It also provided that, where a male donates sperm at a licensed clinic in the UK and his sperm is used at a UK clinic to impregnate a female, the male is not legally responsible for the resulting child.

The 1990 Act also established a UK central register of donors and donor births to be maintained by the Human Fertilisation and Embryology Authority (the 'HFEA'), a supervisory body established by the Act. Following the Act, for any act of sperm donation through a licensed UK clinic that results in a living child, information on the child and the donor must be recorded on the register. This measure was intended to reduce the risk of consanguinity as well as to enforce the limit on the number of births permitted by each donor. The natural child of any donor has access to non-identifying information about their donor, starting at the child's eighteenth birthday.

The emphasis of the 1990 Act was on protecting the unborn child. However, a general shortage of donor sperm at the end of the 20th century, exacerbated by the announcement of the removal of anonymity in the UK, led to concerns about the excessive use of the sperm of some donors. These concerns centered on the export and exchange of donor sperm with overseas clinics, and also the interpretation of the term "sibling use" to include donated embryos produced from one sperm donor. Successive births by surrogates using eggs from different women but sperm from the same sperm donor were also counted as donations to a single recipient. Donors were informed that up to ten births could be produced from their sperm, but the words "other than in exceptional circumstances" in the consent form could potentially lead to many more pregnancies. These concerns led to the SEED Report commissioned by the HFEA, which was in turn followed by new legislation and rules meant to protect the interests of donors. Subsequent changes to legislation are designed to protect donors and recipients so that where a man donates his sperm through a UK clinic, that sperm is not permitted to give rise to more than ten families in the UK, but the donor may give express consent for more families to be created worldwide. However, the export of donor sperm is subject to the European Tissues Directive or the application of the effects of the Directive where exports are outside the EU which relate to traceability and record-keeping.

== International comparison ==
On the global market, Denmark has a well-developed system of sperm export. This success mainly comes from the reputation of Danish sperm donors for being of high quality and, in contrast with the law in the other Nordic countries, gives donors the choice of being either anonymous or non-anonymous to the receiving couple. Furthermore, Nordic sperm donors tend to be tall, with rarer features like blond hair or different color eyes and a light complexion, and highly educated and have altruistic motives for their donations, partly due to the relatively low monetary compensation in Nordic countries. More than 50 countries worldwide are importers of Danish sperm, including Paraguay, Canada, Kenya, and Hong Kong. Several UK clinics also export donor sperm. The use of the sperm outside the UK will also be subject to local rules. Within the EU there are now regulations governing the transfer of human tissue including sperm between member states to ensure that these take place between registered sperm banks. However, the Food and Drug Administration (FDA) of the US has banned import of any sperm, motivated by a risk of mad cow disease, although such a risk is insignificant, since artificial insemination is very different from the route of transmission of mad cow disease. The prevalence of mad cow disease is one in a million, probably less for donors. If prevalence was the case, the infectious proteins would then have to cross the blood-testis barrier to make transmission possible. Transmission of the disease by an insemination is approximately equal to the risk of getting killed by lightning.

== Fictional representation ==
Movie plots involving artificial insemination by donor are seen in Made in America, Road Trip, The Back-Up Plan, The Kids Are All Right, Starbuck, and Baby Mama, the latter also involving surrogacy. In the journal Contexts, sociologist Margaret Nelson noted that big Hollywood movies represent sperm donation as a means of recreating the nuclear family rather than exploring increasingly complex family arrangements.

If These Walls Could Talk 2, released in 2000, features a lesbian couple, Fran and Kal, who are selecting a sperm donor and going through the process of artificial insemination. It shows their intimate conversations about their hopes and fears for their baby as well as the less intimate doctors office where the insemination occurs. It is one of the few films of the time to feature an LGBTQ couple using artificial insemination. Films and other fiction depicting emotional struggles of assisted reproductive technology have had an upswing first in the latter part of the 2000s (decade), although the techniques have been available for decades. Yet, the number of people that can relate to it by personal experience in one way or another is ever growing, and the variety of trials and struggles is huge.

A 2012 Bollywood comedy movie, Vicky Donor, was based on sperm donation. The film release saw an effect; the number of men donating sperm increased in India.

A 2017 Kollywood movie Kutram 23 is also a movie based on sperm donation.

In the 2018 life simulator video game Bitlife, the player can donate sperm; however, they will never meet the child who is born as a result.

== See also ==
- Artificial insemination
- Conception device
- Donor conceived people
- Egg donor
- Ferguson v. McKiernan
- IVF
- McD v. L
- Niyoga
- Posthumous sperm retrieval
- Semen quality
- Sperm bank
- Sperm donation laws by country
- Surrogacy
- Third party reproduction
