= Third-party reproduction =

DNA or gestation from a third party or donor

Third-party reproduction or donor-assisted reproduction is any human reproduction in which DNA or gestation is provided by a third party or donor other than the one or two parents who will raise the resulting child. This goes beyond the traditional father–mother model, and the third party's involvement is limited to the reproductive process and does not extend into the raising of the child. Third-party reproduction is used by couples unable to reproduce by traditional means, by same-sex couples, and by men and women without a partner. Where donor gametes are provided by a donor, the donor will be a biological parent of the resulting child, but in third party reproduction, he or she will not be the caring parent.

== Categories ==
One can distinguish several categories, some of which may be combined:

- Sperm donation. A donor provides sperm in order to father a child for a third-party female.
- Egg donation. A donor provides ova to a woman or couple in order for the egg to be fertilized and implanted in the recipient woman.
  - Spindle transfer. A third party's mitochondrial DNA is transferred to the future mother's ovum. This is used to prevent mitochondrial disease.
- Embryo donation
  - with embryos which were originally created for a genetic mother's assisted pregnancy. Once the genetic mother has completed her own treatment, she may donate unused embryos for use by a third party.
  - or where embryos are specifically created for donation using donor eggs and donor sperm.
- Embryo adoption. Embryos created during a donor's assisted pregnancy are adopted to be implanted in a third party recipient.
- Surrogacy. An embryo is gestated in a third party's uterus (traditional surrogacy) or a woman is inseminated in order to gestate a child for a third party (straight surrogacy).

=== Gestation ===
Gestation is typically initiated by artificial insemination in the case of sperm donation and by embryo transfer after in vitro fertilisation (IVF) in the case of egg donation, embryo donation, and surrogacy. Thus a child can have a genetic and social (non-genetic, non-biological) father, and a genetic, gestational, and social (non-biological) mother, and any combinations thereof. Theoretically a child thus could have 5 parents.

=== Donor treatment ===
A donor treatment is where gametes, i.e. sperm, ova or embryos are provided, or 'donated' by a third party for the purpose of third-party reproduction.

== Combinations ==
Surrogacy includes, in its wider sense, all situations where a surrogate carries a pregnancy for another person. Recently, there has been a tendency to separate the gestational carrier situation from the "true" surrogate restricting the term for a woman who provides a combination of ovum donation and gestational carrier services.

In a 'conventional surrogacy', a surrogate agrees to be inseminated with the sperm of the male partner of the 'commissioning' couple, or with the sperm of one of the male partners in a same-sex relationship, or with sperm provided by a sperm donor. The surrogate is inseminated, conceives, and hands over the baby at the completion of the pregnancy. In conventional surrogacy, the egg which is fertilized is therefore that of the surrogate. A famous case involving paternity rights and surrogacy is the Baby M case.

In a 'gestational surrogacy', a surrogate agrees to the implantation in her of an embryo which may be created either by using an egg provided by another woman who may be part of a 'commissioning' couple, or she may be a single woman. Alternatively, an egg provided by a donor may be used to create the embryo. The embryo implanted in the surrogate may be fertilised using sperm from the male partner of the 'commissioning couple', or by using sperm provided by a sperm donor.

Embryo donation is where extra embryos from a successful IVF of a couple are given to other couples or women for transfer with the goal of producing a successful pregnancy. Embryos for embryo donation may also be created specifically for embryo transfer using donor eggs and sperm, or in some cases donor eggs and donor sperm. It may thus be seen as a combination of sperm donation and egg donation, since what is donated is a combination of these. Such embryos may also be donated to a 'commissioning' woman or a 'commissioning' couple and gestated by a surrogate where, for example, the 'commissioning' woman or the woman of the 'commissioning' couple is infertile and is unable to bring a pregnancy to full term on medical grounds, or is unwilling for social, medical or other reasons, to do so.

== See also ==
- Egg donation
- Sexual surrogate
- Surrogacy
