= Egg donation =

Method of assisted reproduction

- MeSH: D018587

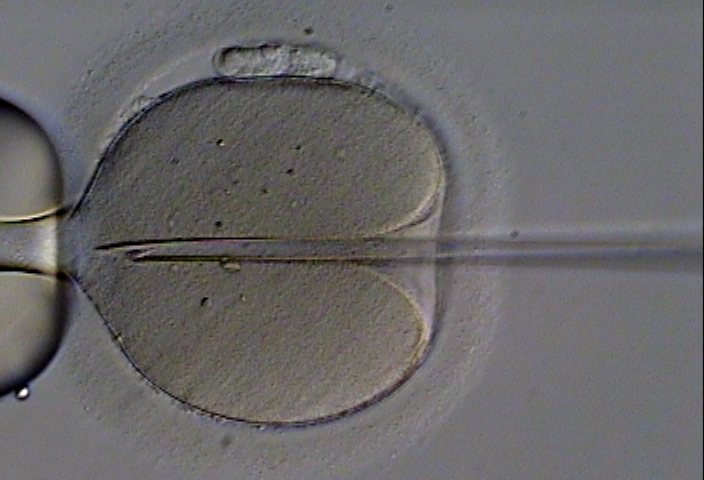

Egg donation (also referred to as "oocyte donation") is the process by which a woman donates eggs to enable another woman to conceive as part of an assisted reproduction treatment or for biomedical research. For assisted reproduction purposes, egg donation typically involves in vitro fertilization technology, with the eggs being fertilized in the laboratory; more rarely, unfertilized eggs may be frozen and stored for later use. Egg donation is a third-party reproduction as part of assisted reproductive technology.

In the United States, the American Society for Reproductive Medicine has issued guidelines for these procedures, and the Food and Drug Administration has a number of guidelines as well. There are boards in countries outside of the US which have the same regulations. However, egg donation agencies in the U.S. can choose whether to abide by the society's regulations or not.

== History ==
The first child born from egg donation was reported in Australia in 1983. In July 1983, a clinic in Southern California reported a pregnancy using egg donation, which led to the birth of the first American child born from egg donation on 3 February 1984. This procedure was performed at the Harbor UCLA Medical Center and the University of California at Los Angeles School of Medicine. In the procedure, which is no longer used today, a fertilized egg that was just beginning to develop was transferred from one woman in whom it had been conceived by artificial insemination to another woman who gave birth to the infant 38 weeks later. The sperm used in the artificial insemination came from the husband of the woman who bore the baby.

Before this development, thousands of infertile women, single men and same-sex male couples had adoption as the only path to parenthood. The donation of human oocytes and embryos has since become a common practice similar to other donations such as blood and major organ donations. The practice of egg donation has sparked media attention and public debate, and has had a substantial impact on the field of reproductive medicine.

This scientific breakthrough changed the possibilities for those who were unable to have children due to female infertility and for those at high risk for passing on hereditary disorders. As IVF developed, the procedures used in egg donation developed in parallel: the egg donor's eggs are now harvested from her ovaries in an outpatient surgical procedure and fertilized in the laboratory, the same procedure used on IVF patients. The resulting embryo or embryos are then transferred into the intended mother instead of into the woman who provided the egg. Donor oocytes thus give women a mechanism to become pregnant and give birth to a child that will be their biological child, but not their genetic child. In cases where the recipient's womb is absent or unable to carry a pregnancy, or in cases involving gay male couples, the embryos are implanted into a gestational surrogate, who carries the embryo to term, per an agreement with the future parents. The combination of egg donation and surrogacy has enabled gay men, including singer Elton John and his partner, to have biological children. Oocyte and embryo donation now account for approximately 18% of in vitro fertilization recorded births in the US.

This work established the technical foundation and legal-ethical framework surrounding the clinical use of human oocyte and embryo donation, a mainstream clinical practice, which has evolved over the past 25 years. Since the initial birth announcement in 1984, there have been well over 47,000 live births resulting from donor oocyte embryo transfer recorded by the Centers for Disease Control (CDC) in the United States to infertile women, who would not have been able to have children by any other existing method.

The legal status and cost/compensation models of egg donation vary significantly by country. It may be totally illegal (e.g., Italy, Germany, Austria); legal only if anonymous and gratuitous—that is, without any compensation for the egg donor (e.g., France); legal only if non-anonymous and gratuitous (e.g., Canada); legal only if anonymous, but egg donors may be compensated (the compensation is often described as being to offset her inconvenience and expenses) (e.g., Spain, Czech Republic, South Africa, Greece); legal only if non-anonymous, but egg donors may be compensated (e.g., the UK); or legal whether or not it is anonymous, and egg donors may be compensated (e.g., the US).

== Indication ==
A need for egg donation may arise for a number of reasons. Infertile couples may resort to egg donation when the female partner cannot have genetic children because her own eggs cannot generate a viable pregnancy, or because they could generate a viable pregnancy but the chances are so low that it is not advisable or financially feasible to do IVF with her own eggs. This situation is often, but not always based on advanced reproductive age. It can also be due to early onset of menopause, which can occur as early as their 20s. In addition, some women are born without ovaries, while some women's reproductive organs have been damaged or surgically removed due to disease or other circumstances. Another indication would be a genetic disorder on part of the woman that either renders her infertile or would be dangerous for any offspring, problems that can be circumvented by using eggs from another woman. Many women have none of these issues, but continue to be unsuccessful using their own eggs—in other words, they have undiagnosed infertility—and thus turn to donor eggs or donor embryos. As stated above, egg donation is also helpful for gay male couples using surrogacy (see LGBT parenting).

- Congenital absence of eggs
  - Turner syndrome
  - Gonadal dysgenesis
- Acquired reduced egg quantity / quality
  - Oophorectomy
  - Premature menopause
  - Chemotherapy
  - Radiation therapy
  - Autoimmunity
  - Advanced maternal age
  - Compromised ovarian reserve
- Other
  - Diseases of X-Sex linkage
  - Repetitive fertilization or pregnancy failure
  - Ovaries inaccessible for egg retrieval

== Types of donors ==
Donors includes the following types:

- Donors unrelated to the recipients who do it for altruistic and/or monetary reasons. In the US they are anonymous donors or semi-anonymous donors recruited by egg donor agencies or IVF clinics. Such donors may also be non-anonymous donors, i.e., they may exchange identifying and contact information with the recipients. In most countries other than the US and UK, the law requires such donors to remain anonymous. US donors are often recruited by agencies who act as intermediaries, typical with promises of money and altruistic rewards.
- Designated donors, e.g. a friend or relative brought by the patients to serve as a donor specifically to help them. In Sweden and France, couples who can bring such a donor still get another person as a donor, but instead get advanced on the waiting list for the procedure, and that donor rather becomes a "cross donor". In other words, the couple brings a designated donor, she donates anonymously to another couple, and the couple that brought her receives eggs from another anonymous donor much more quickly than they would have if they had not been able to provide a designated donor.
- Patients taking part in shared oocyte programmes. Women who go through in vitro fertilization may be willing to donate unused eggs to such a program, where the egg recipients together help paying the cost of the In Vitro Fertilisation (IVF) procedure. It is very cost-effective compared to other alternatives. The pregnancy rate with use of shared oocytes is similar to that with altruistic donors.

== Procedure ==
After being recruited and screened, an egg donor must give informed consent before participating in the IVF process. Once the egg donor is recruited, she undergoes IVF stimulation therapy, followed by the egg retrieval procedure. After retrieval, the ova are fertilized by the sperm of the male partner (or sperm donor) in the laboratory, and, after several days, the best resulting embryo(s) is/are placed in the uterus of the recipient, whose uterine lining has been appropriately prepared for embryo transfer beforehand. If a large number of viable embryos are generated, they can be cryopreserved for future implantation attempts. The recipient is usually, but not always, the person who requested the service and then will carry and deliver the pregnancy and keep the baby.

=== The egg donor's process in detail ===
Before any intensive medical, psychological, or genetic testing is done on a donor, they must first be chosen by a recipient from the profiles on agency or clinic databases (or, in countries where donors are required to remain anonymous, they are chosen by the recipient's doctor based on their physical and temperamental resemblance to the recipient woman). This is due to the fact that all of the mentioned examinations are expensive and the agencies must first confirm that a match is possible or guaranteed before investing in the process. Each egg donor is first referred to a psychologist who will evaluate if she is mentally prepared to undertake and complete the donation process. These evaluations are necessary to ensure that the donor is fully prepared and capable of completing the donation cycle safely and successfully. The donor is then required to undergo a thorough medical examination, including a pelvic exam, a blood test to evaluate hormone levels (notably Anti-Müllerian hormone), infection risk, Rh factor, blood type, drug use, and an ultrasound to examine her ovaries, uterus and other pelvic organs. A family history of approximately the past three generations is also required, meaning that adoptees are usually not accepted because of the lack of past health knowledge. Genetic testing is also usually done on donors to ensure that they do not carry mutations (e.g., cystic fibrosis) that could harm the resulting children; however, not all clinics automatically perform such testing and thus recipients must clarify with their clinics whether such testing will be done.

Once the screening is complete and a legal contract signed, the donor will begin the donation cycle, which typically takes between three and six weeks. An egg retrieval procedure comprises both the Egg Donor's Cycle and the Recipient's Cycle. Birth control pills are administered during the first few weeks of the egg donation process to synchronize the donor's cycle with the recipient's, followed by a series of injections which halt the normal functioning of the donor's ovaries. These injections may be self-administered on a daily basis for a period of one to three weeks. Next, follicle-stimulating hormones (FSH) are given to the donor to stimulate egg production and increases the number of mature eggs produced by the ovaries. Throughout the cycle the donor is monitored often by a physician using blood tests and ultrasound exams to determine the donor's reaction to the hormones and the progress of follicle growth.

Once the doctor decides the follicles are mature, they will establish the date and time for the egg retrieval procedure. Approximately 36 hours before retrieval, the donor must administer one last injection of HCG hormone to ensure that her eggs are ready to be harvested. This hormone will produce a LH hormone concentration peak and induce follicular development. The oocytes are then retrieved from developed follicles via ovarian punction. This extraction must occur before ovulation, as oocytes are too small to be identified once they leave the follicle, and if the appropriate time window is missed the donation cycle will need to be repeated.

The egg retrieval itself is a minimally invasive surgical procedure lasting 20–30 minutes, performed under sedation by an anesthetist, to ensure the donor is kept completely pain free. Egg donors may also be advised to take a pain-relieving medicine one hour before egg collection, to ensure minimum discomfort after the procedure. A small ultrasound-guided needle is inserted through the vagina to aspirate the follicles in both ovaries, which extracts the eggs. After resting in a recovery room for an hour or two, the donor is released. Most donors resume regular activities by the next day.

== Results ==
In the United States, recent national data suggest that donor‑egg IVF leads to a live birth in roughly 40-55% of embryo transfers, depending on whether fresh or frozen donor eggs and embryos are used. Across several donor‑egg IVF attempts, large registry studies suggest that cumulative chances of having a baby can reach around 60%.

With egg donation, women who are past their reproductive years or menopause can still become pregnant. Adriana Iliescu held the record as the oldest woman to give birth using IVF and donated egg, when she gave birth in 2004 at the age of 66, a record passed in 2006. According to a 2002 study, egg donations had a 38% success rate in cases of women past their reproductive years.

== Recipient and donor motivation ==
=== Intended parent motivation ===
Women may resort to egg donation because their ovaries may not be able to produce a substantial number of viable eggs. Women may experience premature ovarian failure and stop producing viable eggs during their reproductive years. Some women may be born without ovaries. Ovaries damaged by chemotherapy or radiotherapy may also no longer produce healthy eggs. Older women with diminished ovarian reserves or older women who are going through menopause could also become pregnant with egg donation.

Women who produce healthy eggs may also elect to use a donor egg so they will not pass on genetic diseases.

Two men who are in a homosexual relationship and wish to have a biological child may choose to fertilize a donor egg so as to have a child without a woman's involvement.

=== Donor motivation ===
An egg donor may be motivated to donate eggs for altruistic reasons. A survey of 80 American women showed that 30% were motivated by altruism alone, another 20% were attracted only by monetary compensation, while 40% of donors were motivated by both reasons. The same study found that 45% of egg donors were students the first time they donated and averaged $4,000 for each donation.

Although the donors may be motivated by both monetary and altruistic reasons, egg agencies desire and prefer to choose donors that are strictly providing eggs for altruistic reasons. The European Union limits any financial compensation for donors to at most $1500. In some countries, most notably Spain and Cyprus, this has limited donors to the poorest segments of society. In the United States, donors are paid regardless of how many eggs she produces. A donor's compensation may increase for each additional time she provides eggs, especially if the donor's eggs have a history of reliably resulting in the recipient becoming pregnant. In the United States, egg-broker agencies are known for advertising to college students who are more likely to be in financial situations that motivate them to participate for the financial compensation. It is not unusual for one student to donate many times. Often, this is done without consideration of potential long-term health consequences. Such a student is arguably not making the decision to donate her eggs autonomously due to her unfavorable financial situation.

== Risks ==
=== Egg donor ===
The procedures for the donor and the medication given to her are identical to the procedures and medications used in autologous IVF (i.e., IVF on patients who are using their own eggs). The egg donor thus has the same risk of complications from IVF as an autologous IVF patient would, such as bleeding from the oocyte recovery procedure and reactions to the hormones used to induce hyperovulation (producing more than one egg), including ovarian hyperstimulation syndrome (OHSS) and, rarely, liver failure.

According to Jansen and Tucker, writing in the same assisted reproductive technologies textbook referenced above, the risk of OHSS varies with the clinic administering the hormones, from 6.6 to 8.4% of cycles, half of them "severe". The most severe form of OHSS is life-threatening. Recent studies have found that donors were at less risk of OHSS when the final maturation of oocytes was induced by GnRH agonist than with recombinant hCG. Both hormones were comparable in the number of mature oocytes produced and fertilization rates. A larger study in the Netherlands found 10 documented cases of deaths from IVF, with a rate of 1:10,000. "All of these patients were treated with GnRH agonists and none of these cases have been published in the scientific literature."

The long-term effect of egg donation on donors has not been well studied, but because the same medications and procedures are used, it is likely similar to the long-term effects (if any) of IVF on patients using their own eggs. The evidence of increased cancer risk is equivocal; some studies have found a slightly increased risk, particularly for those with a family history of breast cancer, while other studies have found no such risk or even a slightly reduced risk in most patients. 1 in 5 women report psychological effects—which may be positive or negative—from donating their eggs, and two-thirds of egg donors were happy with the decision to donate their eggs. The same study found that 20% of women did not recall being aware of any physical risks. In accordance with the American Society for Reproductive Medicine guidelines, female donors are given a limit of 6 cycles that they may donate in order to minimize the possible health risks. Initial evidence suggests that repetitive oocyte donation cycles does not cause accelerated ovarian aging, evidenced by absence of decreased anti-Müllerian hormone (AMH) in such women.

=== Intended parent ===
The recipient has a minimal risk of contracting a transmittable disease. While the donor may test negative for HIV, such testing does not exclude the possibility that the donor has contracted HIV very recently, so the recipient faces a residual risk of exposure. In the US, the FDA requires full infectious disease testing no more than 30 days prior to retrieval and/or transfer. Many clinics require that donors be retested a few days prior to retrieval so the risk to the recipient is minimal. Intimate partners of both the egg donor and the recipient are also tested.

The recipient must also trust that the medical history provided by the donor and her family is accurate. As American donors are paid thousands of dollars, such compensation may drive deceptive behaviors from donors. However, a full psychological evaluation is required by most IVF clinics, providing some evaluation of donor trustworthiness.

In most cases, there is no ongoing relationship between the donor and recipient following the cycle. Both the donor and recipient agree in formal legal documents that the donation of the eggs is final at the time of retrieval, and typically both parties would like any "relationship" to conclude at that point; if they prefer continued contact, they may provide for that in the contract. Even if they prefer anonymity, however, it remains theoretically possible that in the future, some children may be able to identify their donor(s) using DNA databanks and/or registries (e.g., if the donor submits her DNA to a genealogy site and a child born from her donation later submits its DNA to the same site).

Multiple birth is a common complication. Incidence of twin births is very high. At the present time, the American Society for Reproductive Medicine recommends that no more than 1 or 2 embryos be transferred in any given cycle. Remaining embryos are frozen, whether for future transfers if the first one fails, for siblings, or for eventual embryo donation.

There appears to be a slightly higher risk of pregnancy-induced hypertension in pregnancies of egg donation.

=== Fetus ===
Pregnancies with egg donation are associated with a slightly increased risk of placental pathology. The local and systemic immunologic changes are also more pronounced than in natural pregnancies, so it has been suggested that the association is caused by reduced maternal immune tolerance towards the fetus, as the genetic similarity between the carrier and fetus from an egg donation is less than in a natural pregnancy. In contrast, the incidence of other perinatal complications, such as intrauterine growth restriction, preterm birth and congenital malformations, is comparable to conventional IVF without egg donation.

=== Custody ===
Generally legal documents are signed renouncing rights and responsibilities of custody on the part of the donor. Most IVF doctors will not proceed with administering medication to any donor until these documents are in place and a legal "clearance letter" confirming this understanding is provided to the doctor.

== Legality and financial issues ==
The legal status and cost/compensation models of egg donation vary significantly by country. It may be totally illegal (e.g., Italy, Germany); legal only if anonymous and gratuitous—that is, without any compensation for the egg donor (e.g., France); legal only if non-anonymous and gratuitous (e.g., Canada); legal only if anonymous, but egg donors may be compensated (the compensation is often described as being to offset her inconvenience and expenses) (e.g., Spain, Czech Republic, South Africa); legal only if non-anonymous, but egg donors may be compensated (e.g., the UK); or legal whether or not it is anonymous, and egg donors may be compensated (e.g., the US). Because most countries prohibit the sale of body parts, egg donors generally are paid for undergoing the necessary medical procedures rather than for their eggs. In other words, if they complete the cycle, they will be paid the agreed price regardless of how many (or how few) eggs are retrieved.

In countries that prohibit compensation there is an extreme dearth of young women willing to go through this procedure. Additionally, in most countries where it is legal and compensated, the law places a cap on the compensation and that cap tends to be in the vicinity of $1000–$2000. In the US, no law caps the compensation, but the American Society for Reproductive Medicine requires member clinics to abide by their standards, which provide that "sums of $5,000 or more require justification and sums above $10,000 are not appropriate." The "justification" for payments over $5000 may include previous successful donations, unusually good family health history, or membership in minority ethnicities for which it is more difficult to find donors.

As a result of these legal and financial differences around the world, egg donation in the US is much more expensive than it is in other countries. For instance, at one top US clinic it costs more than $26,000 plus the donor's medications (another several thousand dollars).

Having an attorney draft a contract is recommended in order to ensure that the donor has no possible legal rights or responsibilities over the child or any frozen embryos. Hiring an attorney who specializes in reproductive law is thus strongly recommended, at least in the United States; other countries may have other procedures for clarifying the parties' rights, or may simply have legislation that defines the parties' rights. In the US, before the egg donor's IVF cycle begins she typically must sign the Egg Donor Contract, which specifies the rights of the donor and the recipient(s) with respect to the retrieved eggs, the embryos, and any children conceived from the donation. Such contracts should specify that the recipients are the legal parents of the child and the legal owners of any eggs or embryos resulting from the cycle; in other words, while the donor has the right to cancel the cycle at any time prior to egg donation (although if she does so the contract generally provides that she will not be paid), once the eggs are retrieved they belong to the recipient(s). In individual cases the donors and parents may also wish to negotiate terms relating to any unused embryos (e.g., some donors would prefer that unused embryos be destroyed or donated to science, while others would prefer or allow them to be donated to another infertile couple). Some states have also adopted the Uniform Parentage Act, which provides that the recipient or recipients have complete parental responsibility of the conceived child.

In Buzzanca v. Buzzanca, 72 Cal. Rptr.2d 280 (Cal. Ct. App. 1998), the court held that both the recipient and the father of a child conceived through anonymous sperm and egg donation and carried by a surrogate were the legal parents of the child by virtue of their procreative intent. Therefore, the father was required to pay child support even though he sought a divorce before the child was born.

== Donor registries ==
A donor registry is a registry to facilitate donor conceived people, sperm donors and egg donors to establish contact with genetic kindred. They are mostly used by donor conceived people to find genetic half-siblings from the same egg- or sperm donor.

Some donors are non-anonymous, but most are anonymous, i.e. the donor conceived person does not know the true identity of the donor. Still, they may get the donor number from the fertility clinic. If that donor had donated before, then other donor conceived people with the same donor number are thus genetic half-siblings. In short, donor registries match people who type in the same donor number.

Alternatively, if the donor number is not available, then known donor characteristics, e.g. hair, eye and skin color may be used in matching.

Donors may also register, and therefore, donor registries may also match donors with their genetic children.

The largest registry is the Donor Sibling Registry- with more than 25,000 members, the DSR has matched almost 7,000 donor conceived people with their egg and sperm donors, as well as with their half siblings. Alternate methods of providing an information link between the donor and recipient (both agreeing to stay registered on the DSR) are often provided for in the legal document (referred to as the "Egg Donor Agreement".)

== Embryo donation ==
An alternative to egg donation in some couples, especially those in whom the male partner cannot provide viable sperm, is embryo donation. Embryo donation is the use of embryos remaining after a couple's IVF treatments have been completed, to another individual or couple, followed by the placement of those embryos into the recipient woman's uterus, to facilitate pregnancy and childbirth. Embryo donation is more cost-effective than egg donation on a "per live birth" basis. Another study has found that embryos created for one couple, using an egg donor, are often made available for donation to another couple if the first couple chooses not to use them.

== Psychological and social issues ==
Quality of Parent-Infant Relationships

Quality of parent-child attachment in early infancy has been recognized as a crucial factor of a child's socioemotional development. The formation of a quality and secure attachment is largely influenced by parental representations of the parent-child relationship. Concern regarding relationship quality and attachment security in egg donor families is understandable and typically stems from the absence of genetic material shared between the mother and child. However, it has been discovered that the mother's endometrium can generate epigenetic changes in the embryo. Therefore, the embryo from an oocyte donation will have something from the mother who has received the donated oocyte. Specifically, embryos can uptake miRNAs from exosomes secreted by endometrium, so, Hsa-miR-30d secreted by the human endometrium, is taken up by the pre-implantation embryo and might modify its transcriptome. In recent years, researchers have begun to question if lack of genetic commonality between mother and child inhibits the ability to form a quality attachment.

In a recent study, quality of infant-parent relationships was examined among egg donor families in comparison to in vitro fertilization families. Infants were between the ages of 6–18 months. Through use of the Parent Development Interview (PDI) and observational assessment, the study found few differences between family types on the representational level, yet significant differences between family types on the observational level. Egg donation mothers were less sensitive and structuring than IVF mothers, and egg donation infants were less emotionally responsive, and involving than IVF infants. No differences were found in relationship quality between egg donor fathers and IVF fathers representationally or observationally. Due to the developmental implications of forming healthy parent-child relationships in early infancy, the finding that egg donor mothers were less sensitive and structuring towards their infants raises concern about attachment styles among egg donor families, and the impacts it may have on infants' future socioemotional development.

=== Telling the child ===
Most psychologists recommend being open and honest with children from an early age. Groups for donor conceived children make a strong case for the rights of children to have access to information about their genetic background. For donor conceived children who find out after a long period of secrecy, their main grief is usually not the fact that they are not the genetic child of the mother who raised (and, usually, gave birth to) them, but the fact that their parents lied to them, causing loss of trust. Furthermore, assuming that egg-donor conceived children have essentially the same reaction as sperm-donor conceived children, the overturning of one's lifelong understanding of who one's genetic parents were may cause a lasting sense of imbalance and loss of control.

Telling the children that they were donor conceived is recommended, based on decades of experience with adoption (and more recent feedback from donor-conceived children) showing that not telling children is harmful to the parent-child relationship and to the child psychologically. Even parents who would normally be extremely reluctant to tell the child should consider telling if any of the following scenarios applies:

- When anyone other than the parents know about the donation, such that the child might find it out from somebody else.
- When the recipient carries a significant genetic disease, since telling the child will reassure the child that they do not carry the disease.
- Where the child is found to have a genetically transmitted disorder and it is necessary to take legal action which then identifies the donor.

Conversely, when the child is being raised in a religion or a culture that strongly disapproves of donor conception (e.g., a Catholic country where egg donation is illegal), that may counsel against telling the child, at least until the child is much older and clearly capable of understanding why they were not told earlier and of keeping that information to themself.

A systematic review of factors contributing to parental decision-making in disclosing donor conception has shown that parents cite the child's best interest as the main factor they use to make the decision. Parents who disclose donor conception to the child emphasize the importance of an honest parent-child relationship, while parents who do not disclose express their desire to protect the child from social stigma or other trauma. Health care staff and support groups have been demonstrated to affect the decision to disclose the procedure. It is generally recommended that parents who disclose should do so in age-appropriate ways, ideally starting well before the age of five with a discussion of the fact that their parents needed help to have a child because certain things are needed to make a child—namely, sperm and eggs—and because the parents did not have one of those things, a nice woman gave it to them.

=== Families sharing same donor ===
Having contact and meeting among families sharing the same donor generally has positive effects. It gives the child an additional extended family and may help give the child a sense of identity by answering questions about the donor. It is more common among open identity-families headed by single men/women. Less than 1% of those seeking donor-siblings find it a negative experience, and in such cases it is mostly where the parents disagree with each other about how the relationship should proceed.

=== Other family members ===
Parents of donors may regard the donated eggs as a family asset and may regard the donor conceived people as grandchildren.

== Donor marketing ==
For a donor to be accepted by an agency and repeatedly used, she is typically evaluated based on traits preferred by recipients. Because companies participating in this industry operate with an business mindset, successful matches between egg recipients and egg donors generate the revenue necessary to sustain operations. Industry data indicates that the most sought-after donors tend to be those who are (1) proven (i.e., have donated before and produced a pregnancy); (2) conventionally attractive; (3) healthy, with documented family health histories; and (4) highly educated.

Donor profiles presented on agency websites are their primary marketing tool to find recipients and learn what these future consumers want. On the donor profiles listed on the agency website for recipients, or "clients", to peruse for their desired egg match, "physical characteristics, family health history, educational attainment (in some cases, standardized test scores, GPA, and IQ scores are requested), as well as open-ended questions about hobbies, likes and dislikes, and motivations for donating" are included. Donors are encouraged to submit attractive photos and are advised of what the recipient finds as desirable. Profiles that are at some point deemed unacceptable are deleted, whether it be because their personalities did not stand out or their portrayals were viewed as negative in some way. Overweight volunteers for donation are also most often not accepted, not just because of conventional views on physical attractiveness but also because women with a higher body-mass index tend to respond differently (less well) to ovarian stimulation drugs and IVF clinics thus generally recommend that patients not use donors with higher BMIs. Egg donors also have a higher standard of physical appearance than sperm donors; many sperm donors are not required to provide adult photographs of themselves, or in some cases, any photographs.

== Religious views ==
Some Christian leaders indicate that IVF is acceptable (provided that no fertilized embryos are discarded in the process). Many Christian couples who cannot have children thus can go for IVF, with both the husband's sperm and the wife's egg and this is in line with the church's teaching. However, the issue is more problematic with donor eggs.

There are also some Christian leaders (especially Catholic) who are concerned about all in vitro fertility therapies because they disrupt the natural act of conceiving a child where gamete donations, both egg and sperm donations, are seen to "compromise the marital bond and family integrity". and they encourage infertile couples to consider adoption instead.

In the Orthodox Jewish community there is no consensus as to whether an egg donor needs to be Jewish in order for the child to be considered Jewish from birth. In the 1990s religious authorities said that if the birth mother was Jewish that the child would be Jewish as well, but in the past few years rabbis in Israel have begun to reconsider, which in turn is causing more debate around the world. Conservative Rabbi Elliot Dorff has suggested that there are arguments for both sides (birth mother or genetic mother) in religious scripture. Dean of the Center for the Jewish Future at Yeshiva University believes that any child where the birth mother or the genetic mother isn't Jewish should go through a conversion process in infancy, to be sure that their Judaism isn't questioned later in life. This is not an issue in the reform community for two reasons. First, only one parent must be Jewish for the child to be considered Jewish; thus, if the father is Jewish, the mother's religion is irrelevant. Second, if the mother who carries the pregnancy and gives birth is Jewish, reform Jews will generally consider that child to be Jewish from birth because it was born of a Jewish mother.

== See also ==
- Donor conceived person
- Sperm donation
- Surrogacy
- Third-party reproduction
