= Human Fertilisation and Embryology Act 1990 =

Act of the Parliament of the United Kingdom

Human Fertilisation and Embryology Act 1990 (Note: Section 49(1).)
- Act of Parliament
- Parliament of the United Kingdom
- Long title: An Act to make provision in connection with human embryos and any subsequent development of such embryos; to prohibit certain practices in connection with embryos and gametes; to establish a Human Fertilisation and Embryology Authority; to make provision about the persons who in certain circumstances are to be treated in law as the parents of a child; and to amend the Surrogacy Arrangements Act 1985.
- Citation: 1990 c. 37
- Territorial extent: United Kingdom

Dates
- Royal assent: 1 November 1990
- Commencement: various (Note: Section 49(2).)
Other legislation
Amends	Abortion Act 1967; Family Law Reform Act 1969; Social Security Act 1975; House of Commons Disqualification Act 1975; Northern Ireland Assembly Disqualification Act 1975; Social Security (Northern Ireland) Act 1975; Congenital Disabilities (Civil Liability) Act 1976; Adoption Act 1976; Family Law Reform (Northern Ireland) Order 1977; Adoption (Scotland) Act 1978; Data Protection Act 1984; Surrogacy Arrangements Act 1985; Adoption (Northern Ireland) Order 1987; Human Organ Transplants Act 1989; Human Organ Transplants (Northern Ireland) Order 1989
Amended by	Social Security (Consequential Provisions) Act 1992; Social Security (Consequential Provisions) (Northern Ireland) Act 1992; Local Government Finance Act 1992; Criminal Justice and Public Order Act 1994; Northern Ireland Act 1998; Parental Orders (Human Fertilisation and Embryology) (Scotland) Regulations 1994; Adoption and Children Act 2002; Human Tissue Act 2004; Human Fertilisation and Embryology (Quality and Safety) Regulations 2007; Human Fertilisation and Embryology Act 2008; Health Act 2009; Adoption and Children (Scotland) Act 2007 (Consequential Modifications) Order 2011; Tribunals, Courts and Enforcement Act 2007 (Consequential Amendments) Order 2012; Human Fertilisation and Embryology (Quality and Safety) Regulations 2014; Wales Act 2017; Data Protection Act 2018; Human Fertilisation and Embryology (Amendment) Regulations 2018; Human Fertilisation and Embryology Act 2008 (Remedial) Order 2018; Human Fertilisation and Embryology (Amendment) (EU Exit) Regulations 2019; Human Fertilisation and Embryology (Amendment) (EU Exit) Regulations 2020; Health and Care Act 2022; Health and Care Act 2022 (Storage of Gametes and Embryos) (Transitional Provision) Regulations 2024; Human Fertilisation and Embryology (Amendment) Regulations 2024

Status: Amended

Text of statute as originally enacted

Revised text of statute as amended

Text of the Human Fertilisation and Embryology Act 1990 as in force today (including any amendments) within the United Kingdom, from legislation.gov.uk.

The Human Fertilisation and Embryology Act 1990 (c. 37) is an act of the Parliament of the United Kingdom. It created the Human Fertilisation and Embryology Authority which is in charge of human embryo research, along with monitoring and licensing fertility clinics in the United Kingdom.

The authority is composed of a chairman, a deputy chairman, and however many members are appointed by the Secretary of State. They are in charge of reviewing information about human embryos and subsequent development, provision of treatment services, and activities governed by the Human Fertilisation and Embryology Act 1990. The authority also offers information and advice to people seeking treatment, and to those who have donated gametes or embryos for purposes or activities covered in the act. Some of the subjects under the Human Fertilisation and Embryology Act 1990 are prohibitions in connection with gametes, embryos, and germ cells.

The act also addresses licensing conditions, code of practice, and procedure of approval involving human embryos. This only concerns human embryos which have reached the two cell zygote stage, at which they are considered "fertilised" in the act. It also governs the keeping and using of human embryos, but only outside a woman's body. The act contains amendments to UK law regarding termination of pregnancy, surrogacy and parental rights.

== Human Fertilisation and Embryology Authority and stem cell policy ==
The Human Fertilization and Embryology Act 1990 regulates ex-vivo human embryo creation and the research involving them. This act established the Human Fertilisation and Embryology Authority (HFEA) to regulate treatment and research in the UK involving human embryos. In 2001, an extension of the act legalized embryo research for the purposes of "increasing knowledge about the development of embryos," "increasing knowledge about serious disease," and "enabling any such knowledge to be applied in developing treatments for serious disease." The HFEA grants licenses and research permission for up to three years, based on approval of five steps by the Research License Committee.

HFEA policies are reviewed by specialists in the field regularly. After research and literature are reviewed, and open public meetings are held, the summarized information is presented to the Human Fertilisation Embryology Authority.

=== Policy under review ===
==== Sperm and egg donation ====
Donors must meet certain criteria in order to be eligible for sperm, egg, or embryo donation. The donor can donate for research purposes or fertility treatment. Donors should find a HFEA licensed clinic, or can go through the National Gamete Donation Trust.

==== Multiple births as a result of IVF ====
The HFEA is carrying out a detailed review to determine the best way to reduce the risk of multiple pregnancies with in vitro fertilization (IVF). For example, Nadya Suleman (or "Octomom") is publicly known for giving birth to octuplets after IVF treatment.

==== Review of scientific methods to reduce mitochondrial disease ====
This policy allows for the use of techniques which alter the mitochondrial DNA of the egg or an embryo used in IVF, to prevent serious mitochondrial diseases from being inherited.

=== Past policy reviews ===
The policies reviewed by HFEA cover everything from human reproductive cloning to the creation of human-animal hybrids, and include subjects such as ethics with scientific and social significance.

==== Genetic testing ====
Sperm, eggs and embryos received in the donation process are currently tested for many medical conditions, and also quarantined for six months to reduce the risk of complications to the mother and child. Other than a screening for genetic disorders, donors are tested for HIV, hepatitis B, and hepatitis C.

==== Embryo research ====
Embryos must be donated by a woman between the ages of 18 and 35 years old, who has also undergone a medical screening and given informed consent (which can be revoked at any point up until the embryo is used).

==== Fees and regulation ====
- £3,000 for extraction and initial freezing
- £160 yearly for storage
- £4,000-£8,000 total per treatment cycle

==== Risks of treatment ====
"Welfare of the Child" review (multiple pregnancy), for people seeking IVF treatment. While there is always a risk of having a multiples pregnancy after receiving IVF treatment, HFEA is reviewing policies which will reduce this dangerous possibility. No more than two eggs or embryos can be legally implanted in a woman in an IVF treatment. There is a 25% success rate of this procedure per treatment cycle.

==== Clinical safety ====
Includes safety procedure regulations at fertility clinics; includes safe cryopreservation of eggs and embryos. Eggs and embryos are stored for ten years after the initial treatment. If the patient decides not to pursue another pregnancy, the eggs and embryos can be donated for research or to another couple for fertility treatments.

==== Payment of donors ====
In donor-assisted conception, the donor may not receive any monetary compensation (in the UK), although they may have related expenses covered.

== HFEA and liquid nitrogen gamete storage ==
Sperm, eggs and embryos are stored in liquid nitrogen using cryopreservation (defined as the freezing of cells or whole tissues to sub-zero temperatures—the boiling point of liquid nitrogen). This method preserves living organisms in a state where they can be restored to how they were before freezing.

A cryoprotective compound (a liquid called cryopreservation medium), along with carefully controlled cooling and warming cycles ensure that minimal damage is done to the cells.

However, the freezing process is still somewhat damaging. Therefore, men wishing to donate sperm or have it stored for future use must make six sperm deposits for every one child they wish to have, due to the 50% survival rate of the sperm in each deposit. The sperm is then put into straw shaped vials, and placed in a storage tank of either liquid nitrogen, or liquid nitrogen vapor. The sub-zero temperatures of the liquid generally range from -150 degrees Celsius, to -196 degrees Celsius.

According to HFEA, the storage period for both human gametes and embryos cannot exceed ten years. HFEA requires a full informed consent from each party that has any relation to the egg, gametes, or embryo, all of which must be stored in accordance with their consents.

Exceptions to the informed consent of gamete storage:

1. Consent is not required if the gametes were legally obtained from the person in question before they reached 18 years of age.
2. Consent is not required if the person in question is about to undergo a medical procedure which could impair their fertility. In this situation, a licensed medical practitioner can sign off for the storage of the gametes. A medical practitioner can also authorize storage of the gametes, if it is believed to be in the person's best interest.
3. Consent is not required if the person in question is under 16 years of age, and is therefore considered incompetent to give consent.

The act states that it is legal to "take" gametes or accept those provided, and store them without a person's consent, if the person is considered incapable, or until they "acquire such capacity."

However, under paragraphs 9 and 10 of HFEA 1990, a person's gametes cannot be legally stored in the UK after their death.

== Earlier steps and legislation ==
In July 1982 the Warnock Committee Inquiry was established. It was "to consider recent and potential developments in medicine and science related to human fertilisation and embryology; to consider what policies and safeguards should be applied, including consideration of the social, ethical, and legal implications of these developments; and to make recommendations."

The Warnock Report was published on 18 July 1984. The report stated that a regulator was needed due to the 'special status' of embryos.

In 1985 the Interim Licensing Authority was created. It was supposed to regulate work and research regarding human in vitro fertilisation until a permanent government legislation was passed. It remained the only authority until 1990.

The Unborn Children Protection Bill was also created in 1985. It was written by Enoch Powell and prohibited embryonic research. The Health Secretary would only have been allowed an embryo to be kept and implanted if it was for the sole purpose of assisting a named woman to bear a child. No other reason was allowed. This bill was not passed. It was reintroduced in 1986, where it again failed to pass. This was repeated again 1989.

The Surrogacy Arrangements Act 1985 was the first law that governed surrogacy arrangements. It criminalized commercial surrogacy arrangements.

In 1987 the framework for human fertilisation and embryology was created. A white paper was published in regards to the recommendations of the Warnock Report.

In 1990 the Human Fertilisation and Embryology Act 1990 was passed. The Human Fertilisation and Embryology Authority, HFEA, officially started work August 1, 1991.

== HFEA coverage ==
The act covers several areas:

1. Any and all fertility treatment of humans involving the use of donated genetic material (eggs, sperm or embryos).
2. The storage of human eggs, sperm and embryos.
3. Research on early human embryos.
4. The creation of the Human Fertilisation and Embryology Authority, or HFEA, which regulates assisted reproduction in the UK.

Within the act an embryo is defined as a live human embryo where fertilisation is complete, complete is defined as the appearance of a two cell zygote.

== Storage of human eggs, sperm, and embryos ==
The act states that eggs, sperm, and embryo can only be stored for a finite amount of time in very specific conditions that are regulated by the Human Fertilisation and Embryology Authority.

- Human eggs and sperm can be stored for up to ten years.
- Human embryos can be stored for maximum of five years.

== Research on early human embryos ==
Research on human embryos can only be performed for specifically defined purposes that must be considered 'necessary and desirable' by the Human Fertilisation and Embryology Authority. Research can only be performed on an embryo for a maximum of fourteen days or until the primitive streak appears. The genetic composition of any cell within the embryo cannot be altered during the embryo's formation for research.

The act defined several purposes:

- Innovations in infertility treatments
- Increasing knowledge regarding miscarriages
- Increasing knowledge of congenital disease
- Developing more effectual methods of contraception
- Generating methods for detecting and identifying gene or chromosomal irregularities in embryos before implantation.

== Abortion provisions ==
Section 37 of the act amends the Abortion Act 1967. The section specifies and broadens the conditions where abortion is legal.

Women who consider abortion are referred to two doctors. Each doctor then advises her whether abortion is a suitable decision based on the conditions listed below. An abortion is granted only when the doctors reach a unanimous decision that the woman may terminate her pregnancy. An abortion that is performed without this decision or under any other circumstances is considered unlawful.

Abortion may be granted under one of the following circumstances:

1. if the pregnancy has not exceeded its 24th week (previously lowered from 28 weeks in the Abortion Act 1967) and has a heightened risk of injury to the physical and/or mental health of the mother, existing children, or family
2. if the pregnancy places the mother's life in jeopardy
3. if the pregnancy poses a risk of grave permanent injury to the mental or physical health of the mother
4. if there is significant risk or evidence that the unborn child would suffer from physical or mental abnormalities, resulting in a serious handicap

The registered medical practitioner that performs the abortion will continue to act in accordance with the Infant Life (Preservation) Act 1929.

== Amendments ==
In 1991 the statutory storage period and special expeditions sections were revisited. Regulations were extended storage periods for eggs and sperm. Licensing rules for egg and sperm storage were also clarified.

The Human Fertilisation and Embryology (Disclosure of Information) Act 1992 allowed the Human Fertilisation and Embryology Authority to disclose information to others with the patient's consent. for example, information could be shared with their general practitioner.

The Criminal Justice and Public Order Act 1994 added section 156. This prohibited the treatment of cells from aborted embryos. During the same year the Parental Orders regulations allowed parental orders to be made in surrogacy cases.

In 1996 the permitted storage period for embryos was extended.

The Human Fertilisation and Embryology (Deceased Fathers) Act 2003 amended section 28 in 2000.

Sperm may be taken from a deceased male to fertilize an egg if the corresponding man and woman were:

- married
- living as man and wife
- or had been receiving treatment together at a licensed clinic.

In 2001 the Human Fertilisation and Embryology Regulations were added. These regulations extended the purposes that an embryo can be created for in regards to research.

- Better understanding of embryonic development
- Further knowledge of serious disease
- research involving the treatment of serious disease

In addition, the Human Reproductive Cloning Act 2001 was passed. This essential made human reproductive cloning illegal by outlawing the implantation of research embryos.

As of 2004 the Human Fertilisation and Embryology Authority (Disclosure of Donor Information) Regulations 2004 (SI 2004/1511) were formed. Any sperm or egg donors registered after 1 April 2005, were required to pass on name and last address given to the offspring. During this time Parliament began reviewing the Human Fertilisation and Embryology Act 1990.

Licensing of all establishments handling gametes for treatment was required as of 2007 in the Quality and Safety Regulations.

In 2006 a white paper was published regarding a revised legislation for fertility. This was a major review of fertility legislation, updating and amending the Human Fertilisation and Embryology Act 1990. This led to the Human Fertilisation and Embryology Act 2008 being passed.This is the current law in the UK.

== See also ==
- Human Reproductive Cloning Act 2001
- Human Fertilisation and Embryology (Deceased Fathers) Act 2003
- Human Fertilisation and Embryology Act 2008
