= Bucklow Hundred =

Former geographic division of Cheshire, England

Coordinates: 53.35°N 2.46°W

- Status: Hundred
- Subdivisions
  - Type: Parishes

The hundred of Bucklow was an ancient division of the historic county of Cheshire, in northern England. It was known to have been in existence at least as early as 1260, and it was formed from the earlier Domesday hundreds of Bochelau and Tunendune.

== Courts ==
Courts, or Eyres, were normally held annually in the region, a week after the close of the county court. The Justice of Chester presided over the courts, and he would spend several days visiting each hundred in the region. On 13 October 1445 he held an Eyre at either Middlewich or Northwich for the Buckley and Northwich Hundreds, grouped together for convenience.

Annual tourns were also held by the High Sheriff of Cheshire; on 26 September one such tourn was held for Bucklow Hundred in Hale.

== See also ==
- Hundreds of Cheshire
- Sir Peter Leycester, 1st Baronet

== Notes and references ==
=== Bibliography ===
- Clayton, Dorothy J. (1990), The Administration of the County Palatine of Chester, 1442-1485, Manchester University Press ND, ISBN 0719013437
- Dunn, F. I. (1987), The Ancient Parishes, Townships, and Chapelries of Cheshire, Chester: Cheshire Record Office and Chester Diocesan Record Office, ISBN 0906758149
- Harris, B. E.; Thacker, A. T. (1987), The Victoria History of the County of Chester. (Volume 1: Physique, Prehistory, Roman, Anglo-Saxon, and Domesday), Oxford: Oxford University Press, ISBN 0197227619
- Higham, N. J. (1993), The origins of Cheshire, (Origins of the shire), Manchester: Manchester University Press, ISBN 0719031605
- Mortimer, William Williams (1847), The History of the Hundred of Wirral, Whittaker & Co.
