= National Gamete Donation Trust =

SEED Trust NGO

The National Gamete Donation Service (NGDS), now known as the SEED Trust, raises awareness of the national shortage of sperm, egg and embryo donors in the UK. Its aim is to recruit donors to alleviate the shortage, and it provides information on egg, sperm and embryo donation and donor recruitment in the UK.

It works closely with clinics, donors, recipients, the Department of Health, the HFEA, other professional organisations and the media, and provides impartial and confidential information to all.

== Support and advice ==
The NGDS works within the UK only (England, Scotland, Wales and Northern Ireland) to provide information, advice and support to people wishing to become donors and to people who need donors.

The Service runs a National Helpline; all calls, messages and emails are treated confidentially. There are also separate, closed mailing lists for donors and recipients to discuss issues related to donation. Enquirers can be put in contact with existing donors to find out more about what donation involves.

== Campaigns ==
The Service works with the Department of Health on campaigns to recruit donors, most recently the 'Have you got the balls' campaign which ran in the Manchester area (2010–11).

The Service ran a national Donor Satisfaction Survey in 2012 to gather information from UK donors about their experience, and about why people chose not to donate, and use it to improve donor care in clinics.

The Service has improved awareness of the need for donors and recruited donors in ways that can be controversial. The 'Give a Toss' campaign generated complaints but the Trust received over 500 enquiries from prospective donors over three months.

== Funding ==
The Service is funded mainly by a Section 64 Grant from the Department of Health.

== Founding and members ==
The Service was initially set up as the National Gamete Donation Trust by the Donor Conception Network (DC Network) and the Infertility Network (INUK) to develop and continue the work of NEEDS (The National Egg and Embryo Donation Society). It was founded on 2 March 1998 by a working group consisting of representatives from:

- The Royal College of Obstetricians and Gynaecologists
- The Royal College of General Practitioners
- The Royal College of Nursing
- The Royal College of Midwives
- The British Fertility Society
- The British Andrology Society
- The British Infertility Counselling Association
- Progress Educational Trust
- Donor Conception Network
- Infertility Network UK

In 2012 it won a bid to take over the running of the national Contact Register which links donors and donor-conceived people. The name changed to the National Gamete Donation Service. In 2019, the name changed again to the SEED Trust (Sperm, Egg and Embryo Donation Trust).
