= Donnybrook Fair =

Former fair in Dublin, Ireland (1204 - 1850s)

Fairs Act 1204
- Act of Parliament
- Parliament of Ireland
- Long title: An Act for the erection of castle and fortifications at Dublin; establishment of fairs at Donnybrook, Waterford and Limerick
- Citation: 6 John (1204)

Status: Current legislation

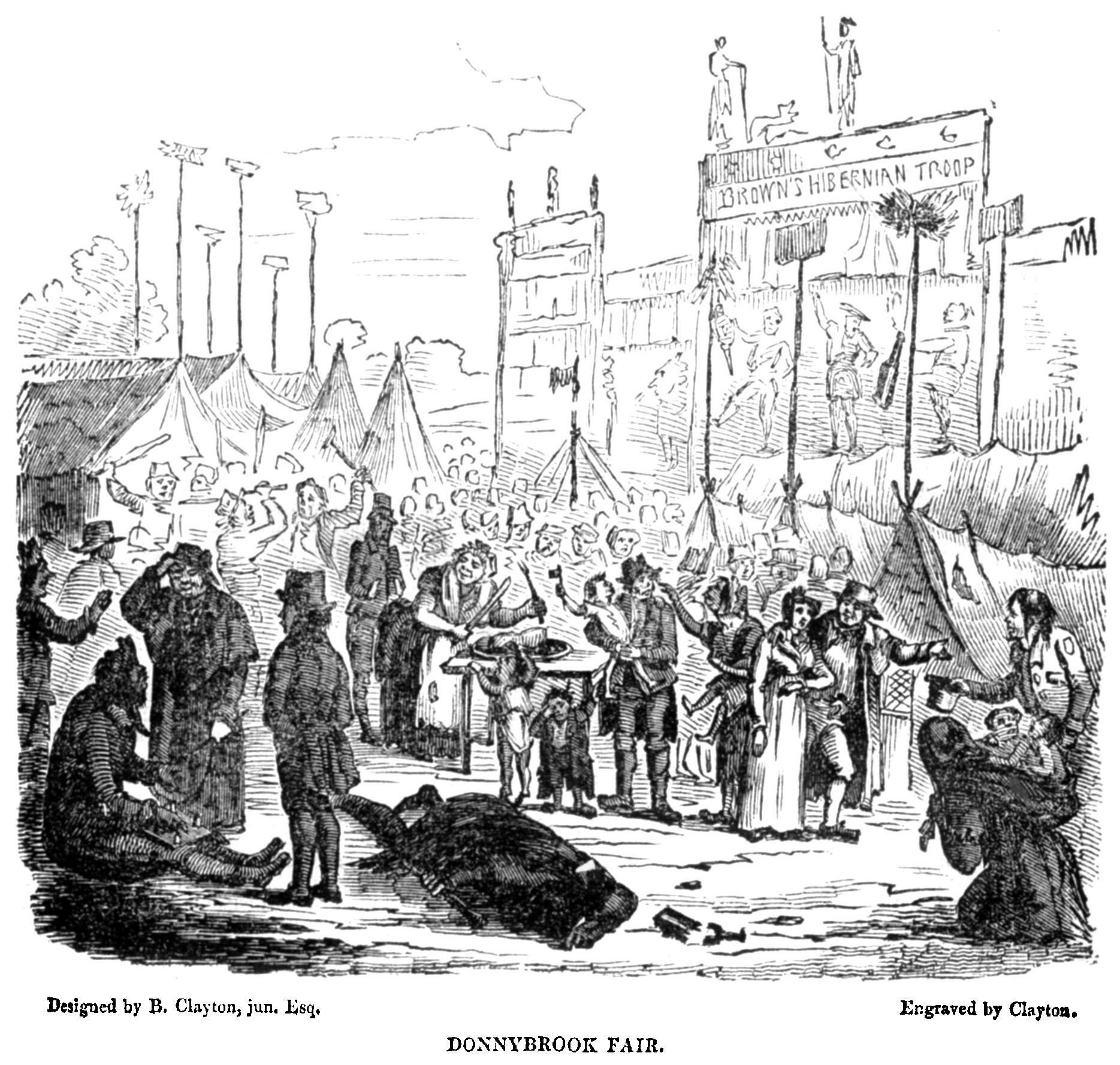
Donnybrook Fair from an illustration in the Dublin Penny Journal in November 1833

Donnybrook Fair was a fair that was held in Donnybrook, Dublin, from 1204 to 1855. It has given its name to an Irish jig, a chain of food stores, a broadsheet ballad, and is a slang term for a brawl or riot.

== History ==
In the year 1204 King John of England granted a licence under the Fairs Act 1204 to the corporation of Dublin to hold an annual eight-day fair in Donnybrook to compensate Dubliners for the expense of building walls and defences around the city. Similar fairs were established in Waterford and Limerick.

In 1252 the duration was extended to fifteen days. Over the years, the terms of holding the fair changed slightly, until in the 18th century it was held on 26 August on Donnybrook Green for a fortnight (two weeks).

By the beginning of the 19th century, the fair had become more a site of public entertainment and drinking than a fair proper, and many attempts were made to have it abolished. However, the licence-holder had by law the right to hold the fair and refused to bow to public pressure.

The licence had been passed from Henry Ussher (died 1756) to William Wolsey, who leased it in 1778 to John Madden and then sold it to him in 1812. A committee, The Committee for the Abolition of Donnybrook Fair, was established to acquire the licence in order to put an end to it, and it was finally bought from John and Peter Madden in 1855 for £3,000, under the auspices of the Lord Mayor of Dublin, Joseph Boyce. The campaign to stop the fair was led by the local curate at Donnybrook Catholic church Father Patrick Nowlan.

== Song ==
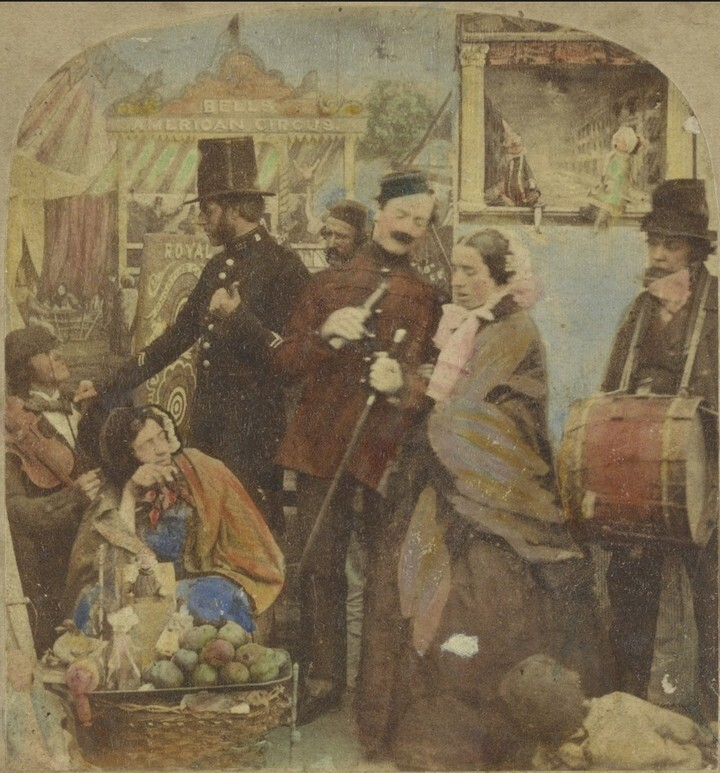
Donnybrook Fair (1852-59)

A broadside ballad called "The Humours of Donnybrook Fair" dates from the 18th century, author unknown. It was recorded by Tommy Makem.

To Donnybrook steer, all you sons of Parnassus
Poor painters, poor poets, poor newsmen, poor knaves
To see what the fun is that all fun surpasses
The sorrow and sadness of green Erin's slaves
O Donnybrook, jewel, full of mirth is your quiver
Where all flock from Dublin to gape and to stare
At two elegant bridges, without e'er a river
So success to the humours of Donnybrook Fair

== Jig ==
The popular Irish double-jig known as "Donnybrook Fair" is also called "The Humours of Donnybrook" or "The Humours of Donnybrook Fair".

== Other uses ==
The term "Donnybrook Fair" is used as a brand by a chain of food retail stores which was founded in 1999 and acquired by the Musgrave Group in 2018. One of the chain's first stores was located in Donnybrook village.

In 2022, Irish WWE wrestler Sheamus created a signature stipulation called the "Good Old Fashioned Donnybrook match", which features a ringside bar, as well as brandy barrels and shillelaghs as weapons.
