= Statute of Marlborough =

English statute of 1267

- Act of Parliament
- Parliament of England
- Long title: Provisiones factae apud Marlebergem, praesente Domino Rege Henrico & Ricardo Rege Alemanorum, & Domino Edwardo filio ejusdem Henrico Rege Primogenuit, & Domino Octobono tunc legato in Anglia.
- Citation: 52 Hen. 3.
- Introduced by: Barons of the Peerage of England
- Territorial extent: England and Wales

Dates
- Royal assent: 18 November 1267
- Commencement: 18 November 1267 (Note: Start of session.)
- Repealed: Various, see text
Other legislation
Amended by	Various, see text
Repealed by	Various, see text
Relates to	Magna Carta; Charter of the Forest

Status: Amended

Text of statute as originally enacted

Revised text of statute as amended

The Statute of Marlborough (52 Hen. 3.) is a set of laws passed by the Parliament of England during the reign of Henry III in 1267. The laws comprised 29 chapters, of which four are still in force. Those four chapters constitute the oldest piece of statute law in the United Kingdom still in force as of 2026.

== Nomenclature and dating ==
The statute is so named as it was passed at Marlborough in Wiltshire, where a Parliament was being held. The preamble dates it as "the two and fiftieth year of the reign of King Henry, son of King John, in the utas of Saint Martin", which would give a date of 18 November 1267; "utas" is an archaic term to denote the eighth day (in inclusive counting, so seventh day in normal English usage) after an event, in this case the feast day of Saint Martin.

The full title of the act passed that day was Provisiones fact[a]e ap[u]d Marleberg[em], p[rae]sent[e] D[omi]no Rege H[enrico] & R[icardo] Rege Ale[manoru]m, & D[omi]no Edwardo fil[io] ejusde[m] H[enrico] R[ege] Primogen[u]it, & D[omi]no Octobono tunc legato in Angli[a]} in Latin, yielding an English Provisions made at Marlborough in the Presence of our lord King Henry, and Richard King of the Romans, and the Lord Edward eldest son of the said King Henry, and the Lord Ottobon, at that Time Legate in England.

== Background ==
The preamble claimed that its purpose was peace, justice and the removal of dissent from the realm; and by taking up and reintroducing many of the previously repudiated Provisions of Oxford, went far to meet the demands of the baronial opposition.

== Extant chapters ==
The four extant chapters of the statute are now cited as two acts: the Distress Act 1267 and the Waste Act 1267.

=== 1, 4, and 15 (Distress Act 1267) ===
Chapters 1, 4, and 15, which seek to govern the recovery of damages ("distresses") and make it illegal to obtain such distresses outside the legal system, are collectively referred to as the Distress Act 1267.

Chapter 1 announces the intention of the act, noting that a recent commotion had led to lords and several other persons refusing to submit to the King's courts and taking distresses at their own pleasure. It makes it illegal to obtain distresses for damages other than through the courts regardless of class or estate. It punishes extralegal attempts to obtain such distresses made after the passage of the act with a fine.

Chapter 4 makes it illegal to take a distress outside of the debtor's county, and punishes such behaviour with a fine in the case of a neighbour but with amercement in the case of a lord doing so with his tenant. It also requires that distresses be reasonable, subjecting takers of excessive distresses to amercement based on the excesses of such distresses.

Chapter 15 requires that distresses be made only before the King or his officers, prohibiting in particular taking distresses on one's own property, the King's highway, or common roads.

Chapter 2 also covered distresses, but was repealed by the Statute Law Revision Act 1948 (11 & 12 Geo. 6. c. 62). It prohibited one from taking distress outside of one's jurisdiction or area, and punished offenders based on the transgression. Chapter 3 also dealt with distresses, punishing those who refused to cooperate with the justice system to be punished based on the transgression. It was repealed by the Statute Law Revision and Civil Procedure Act 1881 (11 & 12 Geo. 6. c. 62).

Chapters 21 and 22 also covered distresses. Chapter 21 required the sheriff to return livestock wrongfully taken from any person upon that person's request without delay. Chapter 22 required a royal writ for distraint against a freeholder and prohibiting coerced testimony against a freeholder without a royal commandment.

=== 23 (Waste Act 1267) ===
Chapter 23 is often referred to as the Waste Act 1267, which seeks to prevent tenant farmers from "making waste" to land they are in tenancy of. Whilst the bulk of the chapter remains in force, the first paragraph was repealed by the Statute Law Revision and Civil Procedure Act 1881 (11 & 12 Geo. 6. c. 62).

== Repealed chapters ==
Among its now repealed chapters are legislation on suits of court, sheriff's tourns, "beaupleader" fines, real actions, essoins, juries, guardians in socage, amercements for default of summons, pleas of false judgement, replevin, freeholders, resisting the King's officers, the confirmation of charters, wardship, redisseizin, inquest, murder, benefit of clergy, and prelates.

By regulating the use of distraint (distress of property) to enforce tenurial services, and redefining other feudal obligations, the statute (in the words of Frederick Maitland) "in many ways marks the end of feudalism." Chapters 7, 8, 16, 22, 24, 26, 27, and 29 were repealed by the Statute Law Revision Act 1863 (26 & 27 Vict. c. 125). Chapter 21 was repealed by the Statute Law Revision and Civil Procedure Act 1881 (11 & 12 Geo. 6. c. 62).

=== 5 (Confirmation of charters) ===
Chapter 5 confirmed Magna Carta and the Charter of the Forest, ordering the King's officers and courts to duly observe and enforce them. It was repealed by the Statute Law Revision and Civil Procedure Act 1881 (11 & 12 Geo. 6. c. 62). The Charter of the Forest was repealed in 1971.

=== 6–7 (Wardships) ===
Chapter 6 made it unlawful for tenants to enfeoff their eldest sons in order to deprive their Lords of their wardships. It also subject lords who maliciously used this provision in court to amercement and paid damages to feoffees wrongly sued. Chapter 7 provided that any guardians who failed to appear before court within half a year lost their wards, but that heirs would not be negatively affected by the negligence of their guardians, ultimately deferring to the common law on such matters. Both chapters were repealed by the Statute Law Revision Act 1863 (26 & 27 Vict. c. 125).

=== 8 (Redisseisin) ===
Chapter 8 provided that those imprisoned for redisseisin should not be released without the King's consent, and that any redisseisor should be fined appropriately. Any Sheriff violating this section was to be fined greatly, and the prisoner also punished. It was repealed by the Statute Law Revision Act 1863 (26 & 27 Vict. c. 125).

=== 9–14 (Courts and their proceedings) ===
Chapter 9 provided that those not subject to a given lord were ineligible to sue in that lord's court, with the exception of those whose ancestors had used those courts prior to Henry's voyage to Britain in 1228. It was repealed by the Statute Law Revision and Civil Procedure Act 1881 (11 & 12 Geo. 6. c. 62).

Chapter 10 exempted various lords and ecclesiastical officers and them who had other bailiwicks from mandatory attendance of the tourns of the local sheriff. It also provided that such tourns would be continued in the fashion of the reigns of Kings Richard and John. It was repealed by the Statute Law Revision and Civil Procedure Act 1881 (11 & 12 Geo. 6. c. 62).

Chapter 11 abolished fines for beau pleader, although it did not do so retroactively. It was repealed by the Statute Law Revision Act 1863 (26 & 27 Vict. c. 125).

Chapter 12 provided for at least four days a year, and up to five or six if convenient, to be set aside to hear pleas of dower. It was repealed by the Statute Law Revision Act 1863 (26 & 27 Vict. c. 125).

Chapter 13 dealt with essoins (legal excuses for not attending court), limiting a defendant to only one essoin before the proceeding of the judgment. It was repealed by the Statute Law Revision Act 1863 (26 & 27 Vict. c. 125).

Chapter 14 suspended jury duty exemptions when service was required for such significant cases as assizes, perambulations, attainders, and the production of covenants.

=== 16–17 (Wardships) ===
Chapter 16 provided that an heir whose ancestor died before the heir had come of age has the right to force the Lord's transfer of the land upon his maturity via an assize, and to receive damages incurred in the assize and the withholding of land since coming of age.

Chapter 17 provided that those who held socage on behalf of an underage heir not lay waste of such inheritance, nor sell or destroy it. It also forbade such guardians from arranging a marriage of the heir except for the heir's benefit. It was repealed by the Statute Law Revision Act 1948 (11 & 12 Geo. 6. c. 62).

=== 18–29 (Courts and their proceedings) ===
Chapter 18 restricted the right of amercement for failure to appear to Chief Justices or Justices of Eyre. Chapter 19 restricted pleas of false judgment to royal courts. Chapter 20 removed the need for an oath to verify an essoin in any court.

Chapter 24 removed the ability of Justices of Eyre to amerce townships for failure of twelve year olds to appear before sheriffs and coroners for inquests on matters of the crown other than homicide. Chapter 25 abolished the trial of murder before royal courts when found to be accidental, such crimes being instead tried as other felonious deaths. Chapter 26 removed the right of Justices of Eyre to amerce persons failing to appear for court on the day of such failure unless such day was the beginning of the session, instead empowering sheriffs to summon them to appear within three or four days for persons resident in the county or at least fifteen days for persons resident without, allowing Justices reasonable discretion on such a date per common law. Chapter 27 confirmed benefit of the clergy, abolishing amercements for court officers responsible for securing a charged cleric's presence on account of the cleric's refusal to submit a plea to the court. Chapter 28 allowed church prelates both to continue lawsuits begun under their predecessors as well as sue for wrongs committed against their predecessors even if the predecessors had not themselves done so. Chapter 29 allowed those whose seisin was complicated by an excessive number of degrees of the writ of entry to secure a new writ from the King's Council.

== Proposed repeal of surviving sections ==
The Law Commission has suggested that two of the remaining four chapters be repealed, as they are no longer useful since the Tribunals, Courts and Enforcement Act 2007. In June 2015 the Law Commission and Scottish Law Commission published a draft bill incorporating the repeal of c.4 (regulating the "taking of unreasonable distresses and the removal of distrained goods out of the debtor's county") and c.15 (concerning the "levying of distress off the tenanted property or on a public highway") of the Statute. However, as of 2026 no action has been taken.

== Survival in jurisdictions with inherited English law ==
As of 2026, chapter 23 remains in force in Washington D.C..

== See also ==
- List of oldest laws remaining in effect
- Statute of Merton, generally considered the first English statute, passed in 1235 but since repealed
- Fairs Act 1204, the oldest statute still in force in Ireland
- Royal Mines Act 1424, the oldest statute still in force in Scotland
- Quia Emptores
- Henry de Bracton
- Statutes of Mortmain

== Bibliography ==
- "Statutum de Marleberge: The Statute of Marlborough". The Statutes of the Realm (1963 ed.). London: Dawsons of Pall Mall. 1805. pp. 19–25 – via HathiTrust.
- Chronological table of the statutes; HMSO, London. 1993. ISBN 0-11-840331-1
- Summary of the Distress Act 1267
