= List of oldest laws remaining in effect =

Law	Jurisdiction	Enacted	Years since	Notes
Code of Justinian	Various	529	1497	Parts of the edict remain in force as foundations of civil law systems across the world.
Quran	Various	632	1394	The Quran and hadith are primary sources of law in Muslim countries with sharia implementation, including Saudi Arabia, Afghanistan, and Iran.
Fairs Act 1204	Ireland	1204	822	The oldest statute in force in Ireland.
Magna Carta (1225)	South Australia	1225	801	
Codex Holmiensis	Schleswig, Germany	1241	785	In 1900, the Bürgerliches Gesetzbuch replaced the Code in Schleswig, albeit with a number of exceptions for areas like dyke law, hunting law, and leasehold law. The Code of Jutland has been cited in a waterway case from 1990 as well as a beach property case from 2000. In both cases, a low German translation authorized by King Christian IV in 1592 was used.
Statute of Marlborough	England and Wales	1267	759	The oldest piece of statute law in the United Kingdom still in force.
Bishop Árni's Law	Iceland	1275	751	The oldest law still in force in Iceland regulating the bishop's authority over churches.
Magna Carta (1297)	United Kingdom	1297	729	Clauses 1, 9, and 29
Magna Carta (1297)	New Zealand, Victoria, New South Wales, Queensland, Australian Capital Territory	1297	729	Clause 29
Magna Carta (1297)	Western Australia, Tasmania, South Australia and the Northern Territory	1297	729	Only chapter 26 had been repealed.
Royal Mines Act 1424	Scotland	1424	602	Oldest law in effect in Scotland.
fr:Paix de Saint-Jacques	Belgium	1487	539	Oldest law remaining in force in Belgium, mostly concerning drainage tunnels.
Ordinance of Villers-Cotterêts	France	1539	487	Oldest law still in effect in France.
Statute of Frauds	United States	1677	349	Originally passed by the British parliament, it remains the oldest common law source in the United States.
Norwegian Code	Norway, Iceland, Faroe Islands	1687	339	As of 2025, only four of its articles remain in effect.
Civil Code of 1734	Sweden, Finland	1734	292	With some modifications and amendments the code remains in force in Sweden and Finland.
An Act to regulate the Time and Manner of administering certain Oaths	United States	1789	237	The oldest federal statute in the United States, parts of which remain in effect.
hu:1827. évi XII. törvény	Hungary	1827	199	Oldest legal act in effect in Hungary, it does not establish any rules or prohibitions, merely memorizing certain individuals.
nl:Wet algemene bepalingen	Netherlands	1829	197	
Bengal Districts Act	India	1836	190	Oldest law still in effect in India.
Towns and Communities Act	Jamaica	1843	183	Oldest law still in effect in Jamaica.
Land Registration Ordinance	Hong Kong	1844	182	Oldest law still in force in Hong Kong.
Civil Code of Indonesia	Indonesia	1847	179	Originally passed during Dutch rule.
Pakistan Penal Code	Pakistan	1860	166	Oldest law still in effect in Pakistan.
Spanish Notaries Act	Spain	1862	164	Oldest law still in effect in Spain.
it:Legge 20 marzo 1865, n. 2248	Italy	1865	161	Oldest law still in effect in Italy.
Trade Regulation Act	Germany	1869	157	Oldest codification of business law in Germany which is still in force with changes.
Proclamation for Calendar Reform	Japan	1872	154	Oldest law still in effect in Japan.
Bankruptcy Act	Samoa	1908	118	Oldest law in force in Samoa.
Zákon č. 61/1918 Sb.	Czech Republic	1918	108	Concerns the abolition of noble orders and titles. Remains in force to this day without criminal penalties.
Ustawa z dnia 24 marca 1920 r.	Poland	1920	106	Oldest law still in effect in Poland, regulating foreign ownership of real estate.
Civil Code of the Russian SFSR	Russia	1922	104	Only sections regarding inheritance remains in force.
Village Law	Turkey	1924	102	
