= Surrogacy Arrangements Act 1985 =

Act of the Parliament of the United Kingdom

Surrogacy Arrangements Act 1985 (Note: Section 5(1).)
- Act of Parliament
- Parliament of the United Kingdom
- Long title: An Act to regulate certain activities in connection with arrangements made with a view to women carrying children as surrogate mothers.
- Citation: 1985 c. 49
- Territorial extent: England and Wales; Scotland; Northern Ireland; (Note: Section 5(2).)

Dates
- Royal assent: 16 July 1985
- Commencement: 16 July 1985 (Note: Section 4(b) of the Interpretation Act 1978.)
Other legislation
Amended by	Children Act 1989; Human Fertilisation and Embryology Act 1990; Criminal Procedure (Consequential Provisions) (Scotland) Act 1995; Statute Law (Repeals) Act 1993; Children (Northern Ireland) Order 1995; Communications Act 2003; Human Fertilisation and Embryology Act 2008

Status: Amended

Text of statute as originally enacted

Revised text of statute as amended

Text of the Surrogacy Arrangements Act 1985 as in force today (including any amendments) within the United Kingdom, from legislation.gov.uk.

Surrogacy Arrangements Act 1985

The Surrogacy Arrangements Act 1985 (c. 49) is an act of the Parliament of the United Kingdom that prohibits commercial surrogacy arrangements. It received Royal Assent on 16 July 1985.

== Overview ==
The act came about as a response to the birth, on 4 January 1985, of Britain's first commercial surrogate baby amid a widespread public outcry.

The act was amended by the Human Fertilisation and Embryology Act 1990 (so that surrogate mothers can always keep the baby if they change their mind) and the Human Fertilisation and Embryology Act 2008.

== Regulation ==
From 1996–1998 Margaret Brazier chaired a review of surrogacy arrangements. It made a number of recommendations including that only expenses, including loss of earnings, should be paid to surrogate mothers, and that all surrogacy agencies should be registered with the Department of Health.

== See also ==
- Transnational Reproduction
