= Margaret Brazier =

British academic (1950–2025)

Margaret Rosetta "Margot" Brazier (née Jacobs; 2 November 1950 – 4 March 2025) was a British academic who was a professor at the University of Manchester's School of Law.Margaret Jacobs was born in Preston, Lancashire on 2 November 1950. She was married to Rodney Brazier, a professor of constitutional law also at the University of Manchester from 1974 until her death.

== Life and career ==
Brazier researched legal issues in the field of medicine, including medical ethics. She was a barrister, ex-member of the Arts and Humanities Research Council (1998–2001), Editor of the Medical Law Review, and ex-president of the Society of Legal Scholars (formerly, Society of Public Teachers of Law) (1997–1999). Brazier was elected a Fellow of the British Academy in 2014, the United Kingdom's national academy for the humanities and social sciences.

She chaired a number of committees, including:

- Chair of the Animal Procedures Committee 1993–98.
- Chair of Review of Surrogacy Arrangements 1996–98.
- Chair of the Retained Organs Commission 2001–2004.
- Chair of the Nuffield Council on Bioethics Working Party on Critical Care Decisions in Fetal and Neonatal Medicine: Ethical Issues 2004–2006.

Brazier wrote the first edition of her textbook Medicine, Patient and the Law in 1987. The 7th edition was published in 2023, along with her monograph, Law and Healing: A History of a Stormy Marriage.

She spoke and published widely on the subject of medical ethics, including to the Manchester Literary & Philosophical Society , THE COURTAULD LECTURE, where notes of her lecture on the Legal and Ethical Aspects of Surrogacy may be viewed.

Brazier's academic work is commemorated in a special edition of the journal Medical Law Review and a 2016 festschrift called Pioneering Healthcare Law: Essays in Honour of Margaret Brazier.

Brazier died on 4 March 2025, aged 74.

== Recognition ==
- Order of the British Empire (1997).
- Fellow of the Royal Society of Arts (1993).
- Fellow of the Academy of Medical Sciences (2007).
- Queen's Counsel (honoris causa) (2008).
- Fellow of the British Academy (2014).
