= Human Fertilisation and Embryology (Deceased Fathers) Act 2003 =

Act of the Parliament of the United Kingdom

Human Fertilisation and Embryology (Deceased Fathers) Act 2003 (Note: Section 4(1).)
- Act of Parliament
- Parliament of the United Kingdom
- Long title: An Act to make provision about the circumstances in which, and the extent to which, a man is to be treated in law as the father of a child where the child has resulted from certain fertility treatment undertaken after the man’s death; and for connected purposes.
- Citation: 2003 c. 24
- Territorial extent: England and Wales; Scotland; Northern Ireland; except that any amendment by the Schedule of an enactment has the same extent as the enactment amended.; (Note: Section 4(4)–(5).)

Dates
- Royal assent: 18 September 2003
- Commencement: 18 September 2003 (section 4); 1 December 2003 (rest of act); (Note: Section 4(2)–(3). The Human Fertilisation and Embryology (Deceased Fathers) Act 2003 (Commencement) Order 2003.)
Other legislation
Amends	Births and Deaths Registration Act 1953; Registration of Births, Deaths and Marriages (Scotland) Act 1965; Births and Deaths Registration (Northern Ireland) Order 1976; Adoption (Scotland) Act 1978; Adoption (Northern Ireland) Order 1987; Human Fertilisation and Embryology Act 1990; Adoption and Children Act 2002
Amended by	Human Fertilisation and Embryology Act 2008
Relates to	Regulatory Reform Act 2001

Status: Amended

Text of statute as originally enacted

Revised text of statute as amended

The Human Fertilisation and Embryology (Deceased Fathers) Act 2003 (c. 24) is an act of the Parliament of the United Kingdom

== Background ==
Diane Blood's husband, Steven, died from meningitis in 1995. Steven gave her permission to use his sperm to have children.

In 1997, now a widow, Blood, took the British government to court to seek permission to have a baby using her then-deceased husband's sperm. The Court of Appeal ruled that she could only do this if she was treated abroad.

Blood then had four children conceived from the sperm of her husband, and took the government to court for her husband to be recognised as the father on their birth certificates.

== Provisions ==
The act amended the Human Fertilisation and Embryology Act 1990 to allow, among other things, a man to be listed in birth certificates as the father of a child even if the child was conceived after the death of the man.

It is thought to affect around five to ten families a year. Up to 50 families with posthumously conceived children were expected to benefit from the legislation when it was passed.
