= Emily Jackson =

British legal scholar (born 1966)

Emily Jackson OBE FBA
- Born: Emily Meg Jackson; 28 December 1966 (age 59)
- Awards: Fellow of the British Academy (FBA)

Academic background
- Education: Bushey Meads School
- Alma mater: Brasenose College, Oxford

Academic work
- Discipline: Jurisprudence
- Sub-discipline: Medical law Medical ethics
- Institutions: Faculty of Law, University of Oxford; St Catharine's College, Cambridge; Birkbeck College, University of London; Queen Mary College, University of London; London School of Economics

Emily Meg Jackson, OBE, FBA (born 28 December 1966) is a British legal scholar who specialises in medical law. She has been Professor of Law at the London School of Economics since 2007. She has previously researched or lectured at the Faculty of Law, University of Oxford, at St Catharine's College, Cambridge, at Birkbeck College, University of London, and at Queen Mary, University of London.

== Early life and education ==
Jackson was born on 28 December 1966 in London, England, to Douglas and Lesley Jackson. She was educated at Bushey Meads School, a state secondary school in Bushey, Hertfordshire. She studied jurisprudence at Brasenose College, Oxford, and graduated from the University of Oxford with a Bachelor of Arts (BA) degree in 1989.

== Academic career ==
After graduating from university, Jackson began her career as a research officer at the Centre for Socio-Legal Studies, a research institute of the Faculty of Law, University of Oxford. In 1991, she was elected a Fellow of St Catharine's College, Cambridge and appointed a lecturer in law. She then moved to Birkbeck College, University of London where she was a lecturer in law from 1993 to 1997. In 1998, she joined the London School of Economics for the first time having been appointed as a senior lecturer in law.

From 2004 to 2007, Jackson was Professor of Medical Law at Queen Mary, University of London. She was appointed Professor of Law at the London School of Economics in 2007 and Head of the Law Department in 2012.

Jackson has held a number of appointments outside of her university work. From 2003 to 2012, she was a member of the Human Fertilisation and Embryology Authority; she served as its deputy chair from 2008 to 2012. Since 2005, she has been a member of the Medical Ethics Committee of the British Medical Association. Since 2011, she has been a member of the Medical Research Council's Ethics and Public Involvement Committee. Since 2012, she has been a member of the Ethics Committee of the Royal College of Obstetricians and Gynaecologists. In 2013, she was a member of the Department of Health's Independent Panel led by Julia Neuberger, Baroness Neuberger that reviewed the Liverpool Care Pathway for the Dying Patient. She has been a member of the Judicial Appointments Commission.

== Honours ==
In July 2016, Jackson was elected a Fellow of the British Academy (FBA), the UK's national academy for the humanities and the social sciences.

She was appointed Officer of the Order of the British Empire (OBE) in the 2017 Birthday Honours for services to higher education.
