= Adoption and Children Act 2002 =

UK legislation governing adoption and other family-related matters

Adoption and Children Act 2002 (Note: Section 150.)
- Act of Parliament
- Parliament of the United Kingdom
- Long title: An Act to restate and amend the law relating to adoption; to make further amendments of the law relating to children; to amend section 93 of the Local Government Act 2000; and for connected purposes.
- Citation: 2002 c. 38
- Introduced by: Alan Milburn, Secretary of State for Health (Commons); Lord Hunt, Parliamentary Under-Secretary of State for Health (Lords)
- Territorial extent: England and Wales (except schedule 4, paragraph 23); Scotland (sections 41(5), 41(6), 41(7), 41(8), 41(9), 63(2), 63(3), 63(4), 63(5), 65(2)(a), 65(2)(b), 65(3), 123, 124, 137, 138, 139, 140, 141, 142, 142, 143, 144, 146, 147, 148, 149 and 150 and schedule 4, paragraph 23); Northern Ireland (sections 63(2), 63(3), 63(4), 63(5), 65(2)(a), 65(2)(b), 65(3), 123, 124, 137, 140, 141, 142, 142, 143, 144, 146, 147, 148, 149 and 150); (Note: Section 149.)

Dates
- Royal assent: 7 November 2002
- Commencement: Miscellaneous; all provisions had come into force by 30 December 2005 (Note: Section 148.)
Other legislation
Amends	Immigration Act 1971; Legitimacy Act 1976; Criminal Law Act 1977; Magistrates' Courts Act 1980; County Courts Act 1984; Child Abduction Act 1984; Family Law Reform Act 1987; Human Fertilisation and Embryology Act 1990; Courts and Legal Services Act 1990; Local Government Act 2000; Criminal Justice and Court Services Act 2000
Amended by	Human Fertilisation and Embryology (Deceased Fathers) Act 2003; Mental Capacity Act 2005; National Health Service (Consequential Provisions) Act 2006; Safeguarding Vulnerable Groups Act 2006; Human Fertilisation and Embryology Act 2008

Status: Amended

Text of statute as originally enacted

Revised text of statute as amended

The Adoption and Children Act 2002 (c. 38) is an act of the Parliament of the United Kingdom that allows unmarried or married people and same-sex couples in England and Wales to adopt children. The reforms introduced in the act were based on a comprehensive review of adoption and were described by The Guardian as "the most radical overhaul of adoption legislation for almost 30 years".

The act also allows for the introduction of special guardianship, a legal status that allows for a child to be cared for by a person with rights similar to a traditional legal guardian, but without a requirement for absolute legal separation from the child's birth parents. Special guardianship provisions were passed into law by statutory instrument in 2005 and came into force in 2006.

The Act also introduced a procedure to allow people to trace relatives placed for adoption through an intermediary if both persons are over 18.

An equivalent Act was passed in Scotland in 2007.

== Gay adoption ==
Section 44 of the Act, which allowed gay couples to adopt, was subject to considerable controversy and faced strong opposition in Parliament: on 16 October 2002, the House of Lords, during consideration of the Bill, passed with 196 votes in favour and 162 against an amendment which would have only allowed straight married couples to adopt. On 4 November, the House of Commons voted 287—233 to disagree with the change proposed by the Lords; the next day the House of Lords, by a vote of 215 to 184, unexpectedly decided not to insist on its amendment, allowing the Bill to immediately receive Royal Assent.

== See also ==
- Same-sex adoption in the United Kingdom
