= City of Limerick Act 1292 =

Act of the Parliament of Ireland

City of Limerick Act 1292 (Note: Short title given by the Statute Law Revision Act 2007 (No. 28))
- Act of Parliament
- Parliament of Ireland
- Long title: An Act concerning the liberties of the citizens of Limerick.
- Citation: 20 Edw. 1 (I)
- Territorial extent: Ireland

Dates
- Royal assent: 1292
- Commencement: 1292

Other legislation
- Amended by: Statute Law Revision Act 2007

Status: Current legislation

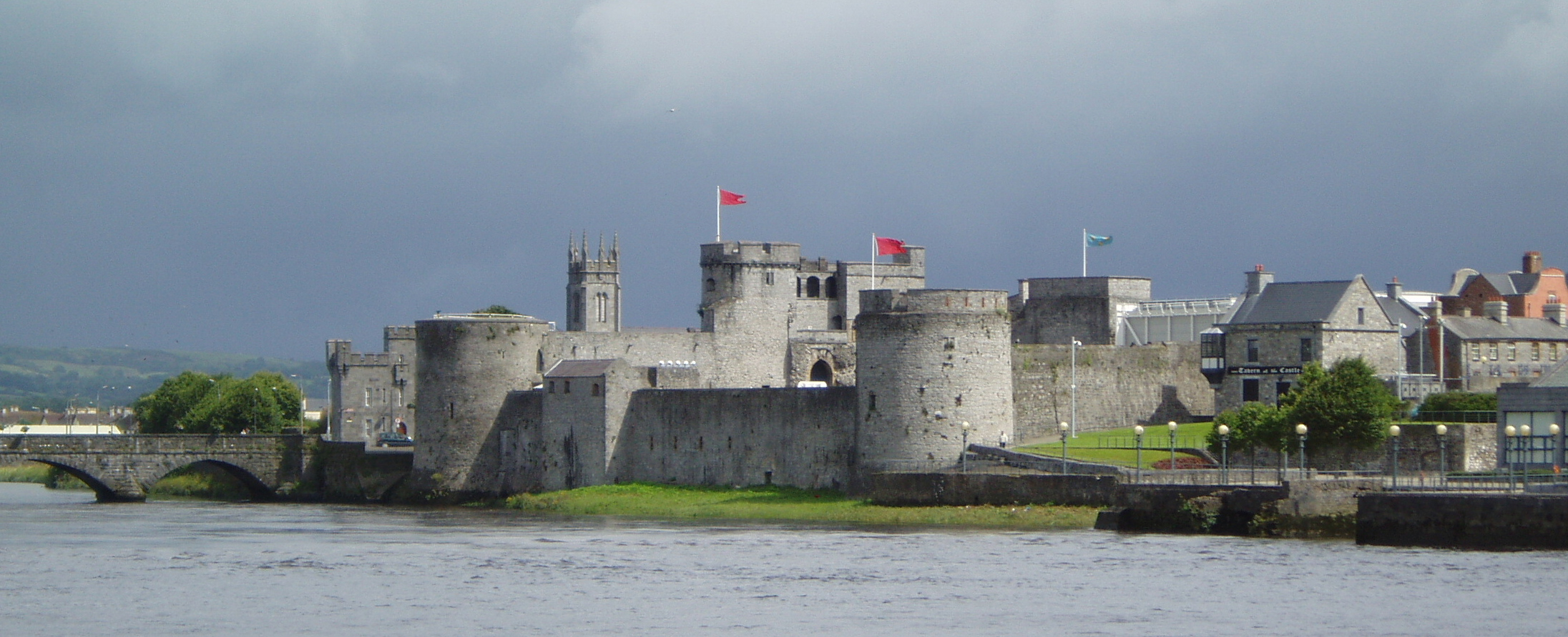
King John's Castle in Limerick, built prior to the passage of the act.

The City of Limerick Act 1292 (20 Edw. 1 (I)) (Irish: Acht Chathair Luimnigh) is an Act of Parliament (United Kingdom) of the Parliament of Ireland, passed in 1292, during the reign of Edward I as Lord of Ireland.

The act covered the liberties of the citizens of Limerick.
