= Legitimacy Act 1976 =

Act of the Parliament of the United Kingdom

Legitimacy Act 1976 (Note: Section 12(1).)
- Act of Parliament
- Parliament of the United Kingdom
- Long title: An Act to consolidate certain enactments relating to legitimacy.
- Citation: 1976 c. 31
- Territorial extent: England and Wales (Note: Section 12(3).)

Dates
- Royal assent: 22 July 1976
- Commencement: 22 August 1976 (Note: Section 12(2).)

Other legislation
- Amends: See § Repealed enactments
- Repeals/revokes: See § Repealed enactments
- Amended by: Adoption Act 1976; Family Law Reform Act 1987; Trusts of Land and Appointment of Trustees Act 1996; Adoption and Children Act 2002; Human Fertilisation and Embryology Act 2008; Marriage (Same Sex Couples) Act 2013 (Consequential and Contrary Provisions and Scotland) Order 2014; Marriage (Same Sex Couples) Act 2013 (Consequential and Contrary Provisions and Scotland) and Marriage and Civil Partnership (Scotland) Act 2014 (Consequential Provisions) Order 2014; Civil Partnership (Opposite-sex Couples) Regulations 2019

Status: Amended

Text of statute as originally enacted

Revised text of statute as amended

Text of the Legitimacy Act 1976 as in force today (including any amendments) within the United Kingdom, from legislation.gov.uk.

The Legitimacy Act 1976 (c. 31) is an act of the Parliament of the United Kingdom that consolidated enactments related to legitimacy in England and Wales.

== Provisions ==
=== Repealed enactments ===
Section 11(2) of the act repealed 5 enactments, listed in schedule 2 to the act.

Enactments repealed by section 11(2)
Citation	Short title	Extent of repeal
16 & 17 Geo. 5. c. 60	Legitimacy Act 1926	Sections 1(1) and (4).
16 & 17 Geo. 5. c. 60	Legitimacy Act 1926	Sections 6, 7 and 8.
16 & 17 Geo. 5. c. 60	Legitimacy Act 1926	Sections 10, 11 and 12.
16 & 17 Geo. 5. c. 60	Legitimacy Act 1926	The Schedule.
5 & 6 Eliz. 2. c. 39	Legitimation (Re-registration of Birth) Act 1957	Section 1(1).
5 & 6 Eliz. 2. c. 39	Legitimation (Re-registration of Birth) Act 1957	Section 2.
7 & 8 Eliz. 2. c. 73	Legitimacy Act 1959	Section 1.
1969 c. 46	Family Law Reform Act 1969	In section 2, subsections (1) to (5).
1969 c. 46	Family Law Reform Act 1969	Section 6(4).
1969 c. 46	Family Law Reform Act 1969	Section 16(2).
1975 c. 72	Children Act 1975	In section 8(9) the words from "and related" to the end.
1975 c. 72	Children Act 1975	In Schedule 1, paragraphs 1(3), 12 and 13; in paragraph 14, sub-paragraphs (1)(b) and (2), and words "or is legitimated" in sub-paragraph (3)(d); and paragraph 15(1)(b).
