= Ordinance of Villers-Cotterêts =

Statute that mandated the use of French for all legal actions

The Ordinance of Villers-Cotterêts (French: Ordonnance de Villers-Cotterêts, pronounced [ɔʁdɔnɑ̃s də vilɛʁ kɔtʁɛ]) is an extensive piece of reform legislation signed into law by Francis I of France on August 10, 1539, in the city of Villers-Cotterêts and the oldest French legislation still used partly by French courts.

Largely the work of Chancellor Guillaume Poyet, the legislative edict had 192 articles and dealt with a number of government, judicial and ecclesiastical matters (ordonnance générale en matière de police et de justice).

== Articles 110 and 111 ==
Articles 110 and 111, the most famous, and the oldest still in use in the French legislation, called for the use of French in all legal acts, notarized contracts and official legislation to avoid any linguistic confusion:

CX. Que les arrestz soient clers & entendibles. Et affin quil ny ait cause de doubter sur lintelligence desdictz arrestz. Nous voulons & ordonnons quilz soient faictz & escriptz si clairement quil ny ait ne puisse auoir aulcune ambiguite ou incertitude ne lieu a en demander interpretation.

110. That decrees be clear and understandable.
And in order that there may be no cause for doubt over the meaning of the said decrees. We will and order that they be composed and written so clearly that there be not nor can be any ambiguity or uncertainty, nor grounds for requiring interpretation thereof.

CXI. De prononcer & expedier tous actes en langage francoys. Et pource que telles choses sont souuentesfoys aduenues sur lintelligence des motz latins contenuz esdictz arrestz. Nous voulons que doresenavant tous arrestz ensemble toutes autres procedeures soyent de noz cours souueraines ou autres subalternes et inferieures, soyent de registres, enquestes, contractz, commissions, sentences, testamens et autres quelzconques actes et exploictz de justice, ou qui en dependent, soyent prononcez, enregistrez et deliurez aux parties en langage maternel francoys et non autrement.

111. On pronouncing and drawing up all legal documents in the French language.
And because so many things often hinge on the meaning of Latin words contained in the said documents. We will that from henceforth all decrees together with all other proceedings, whether of our royal courts or others subordinate or inferior, whether records, surveys, contracts, commissions, awards, wills, and all other acts and deeds of justice or dependent thereon be spoken, written, and given to the parties in the French mother tongue and not otherwise.

The major goal of these articles was to discontinue the use of Latin in official documents (although Latin continued to be used in church registers in some regions of France), but they also had an effect on the use of the other languages and dialects spoken in many regions of France.

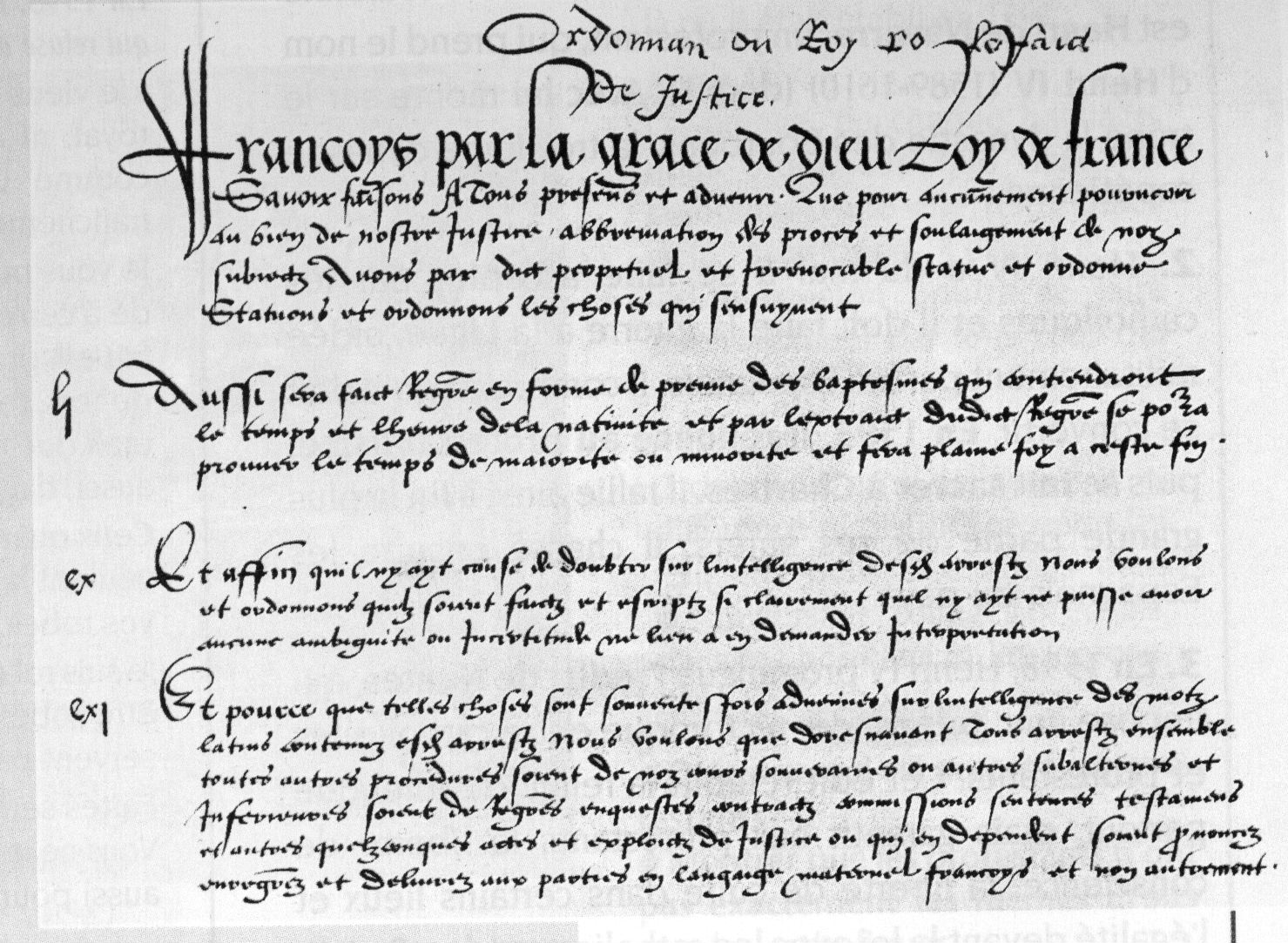
The first manuscript page of the Ordinance of Villers-Cotterêts, 1539

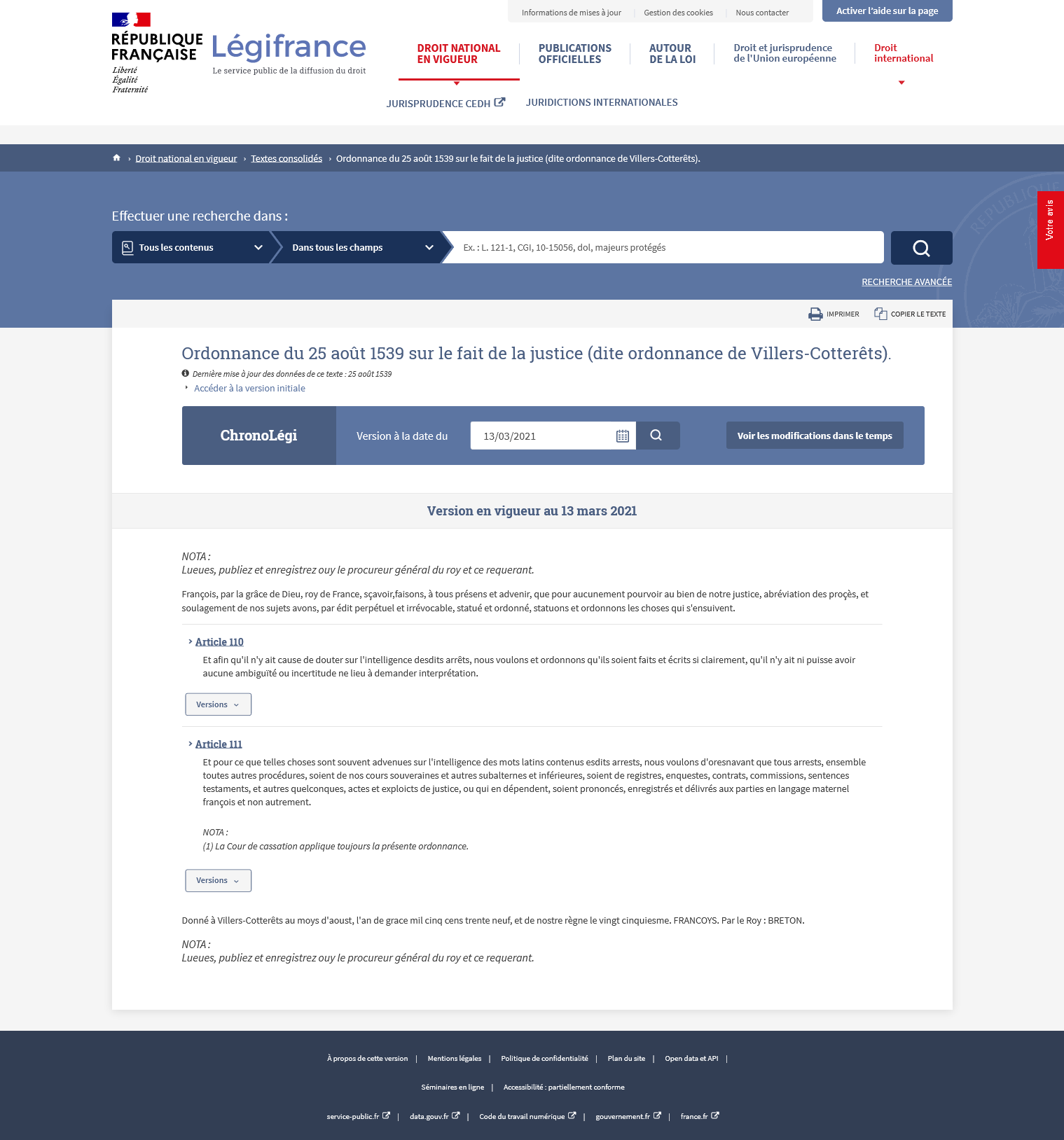
Articles 110 and 111 of the ordinance on Légifrance

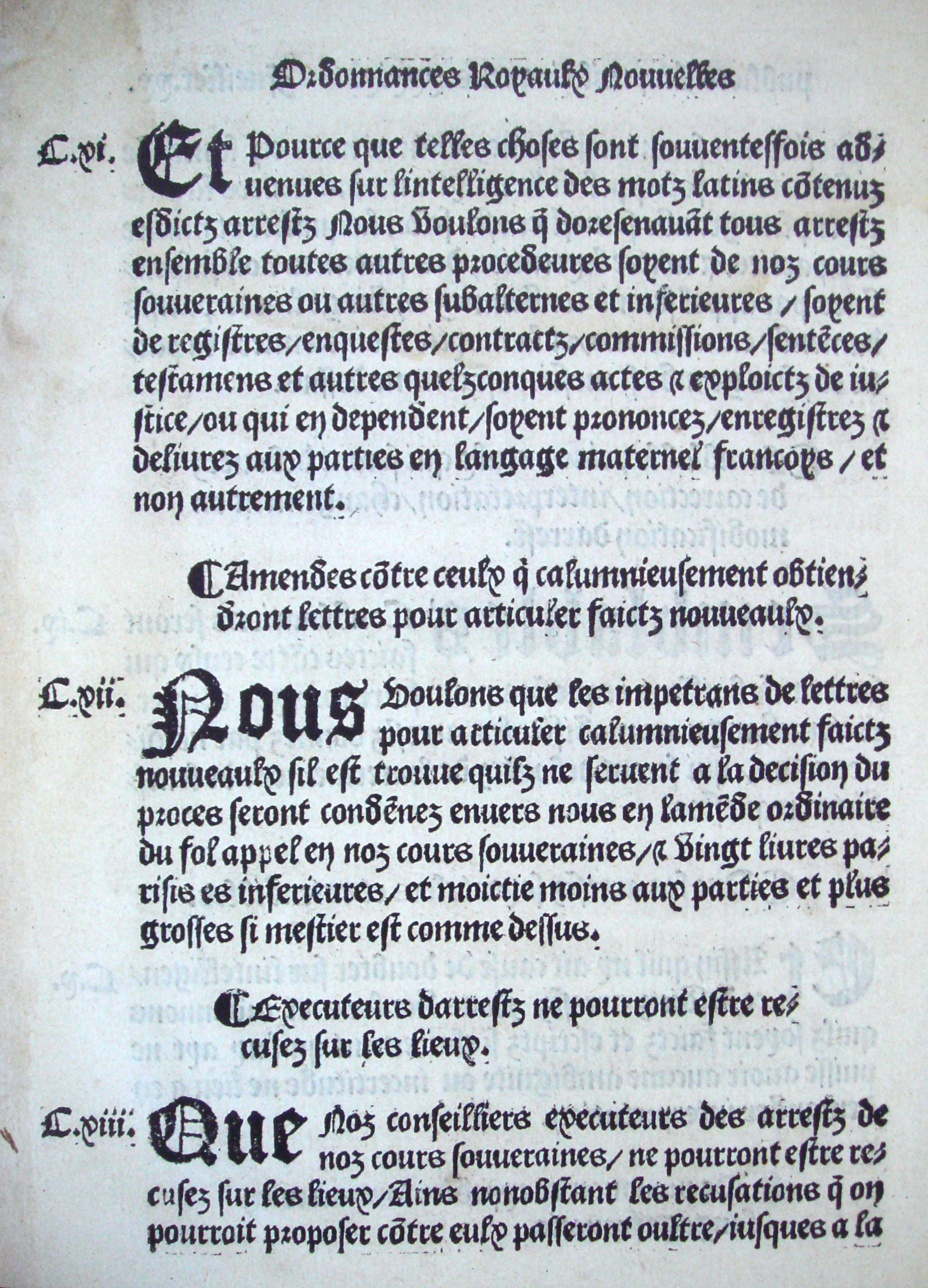
Printed version of article 111 of the Ordinance of Villers-Cotterêts, prescribing the use of French in official documents

== Registrations of births and deaths ==
The ordinance was part of a wider legislation regarding the policing of church benefices, to keep vital records registers in the various church local institutions (mainly parishes). The ordinance ordered the creation of at least a register of baptisms, needed for determining the age of candidates for ecclesiastical office, as a proof of one's date of birth, and a register of burials of churchmen, as a proof of one's date of death. Though both registers were kept by religious authorities, they were authenticated by a public notary, always a layman, and were kept in the local royal administration's archives. In fact, as the church kept parish registers since the Middle Ages (the oldest one in France is Givry's, of 1334), these registers were used to meet the ordinance's dispositions.

The national registration was fully laicized in 1792 during the French Revolution by order of the French Republic. These records have continued until the present and are kept at the departmental archives. The civil registration now includes birth, marriage, divorce, and death records.

== Other articles ==
Another article prohibited guilds and trade federations (toute confrérie de gens de métier et artisans') in an attempt to suppress workers' strikes (although mutual-aid groups were unaffected).

== Effects ==
Many of these clauses marked a move towards an expanded, unified and centralized state and the clauses on the use of French marked a major step towards the linguistic and ideological unification of France at a time of growing national sentiment and identity.

Despite the effort to bring clarity to the complex systems of justice and administration prevailing in different parts of France and to make them more accessible, Article 111 left uncertainty in failing to define the French mother tongue. Many varieties of French were spoken around the country, to say nothing of sizeable regional minorities like Occitans, Bretons and Basques whose mother tongue was not French at all.

It was not until 1794 that the government decreed French to be the only language of the state for all official business, a situation still in force under Article 2 of the current French Constitution.

== See also ==
- La Défense et illustration de la langue française (1549, English: The defense and illustration of the French language), a ten-year later text by Joachim du Bellay which call for the enrichment of the French language and promote its use in literary and scientific works instead of Latin.
- Sachsenspiegel, c. 1220, first legal document written in German rather than Latin
- Pleading in English Act 1362, English law mandating use of English instead of French in oral argument in court
- Proceedings in Courts of Justice Act 1730, British law mandating use of English instead of Latin in court writing
- List of oldest laws remaining in effect
