= Human Reproductive Cloning Act 2001 =

Act of the Parliament of the United Kingdom

Human Reproductive Cloning Act 2001 (Note: Section 2(1).)
- Act of Parliament
- Parliament of the United Kingdom
- Long title: An Act to prohibit the placing in a woman of a human embryo which has been created otherwise than by fertilisation.
- Citation: 2001 c. 23
- Territorial extent: United Kingdom (Note: Section 2(2)–(3).)

Dates
- Royal assent: 4 December 2001
- Commencement: 4 December 2001 (Note: Section 4(b) of the Interpretation Act 1978.)
- Repealed: 1 October 2009
Other legislation
Repealed by	Human Fertilisation and Embryology Act 2008

Status: Repealed

Text of statute as originally enacted

Revised text of statute as amended

The Human Reproductive Cloning Act 2001 (c. 23) was an act of the Parliament of the United Kingdom "to prohibit the placing in a woman of a human embryo which has been created otherwise than by fertilisation". The act received royal assent on 4 December 2001.

On 14 January 2001, the British government passed the Human Fertilisation and Embryology (Research Purposes) Regulations 2001 (SI 2001/188) to amend the Human Fertilisation and Embryology Act 1990 by extending allowable reasons for embryo research, to permit research around stem cells and cell nuclear replacement, thus allowing therapeutic cloning. However, on 15 November 2001, a pro-life group won a High Court legal challenge, which struck down the regulation and effectively left all forms of cloning unregulated in the UK. Their hope was that Parliament would fill this gap by passing prohibitive legislation. Parliament was quick to pass the Human Reproductive Cloning Act 2001 in order to explicitly prohibit reproductive cloning. The remaining gap with regard to therapeutic cloning was closed when the appeals courts reversed the previous decision of the High Court.

The act was repealed and replaced by the Human Fertilisation and Embryology Act 2008.
