= Rodney Brazier =

British professor of constitutional law

Rodney Brazier MVO, LLD, FRHistS (born 1946) is emeritus professor of constitutional law at the University of Manchester and a barrister and an emeritus bencher of Lincoln's Inn.

His expertise on the British constitution has been provided to various parliamentary committees and investigations, while he has written and co-written a wide range of books and articles on constitutional topics.

Rodney was appointed Member of the Royal Victorian Order (MVO) in the 2013 Birthday Honours for services to constitutional law.

Rodney was married to Margaret Brazier, also a professor emerita at the University of Manchester specialising in medical law from 1974 until her death in 2025.

== Publications ==
=== Books ===
- Choosing a Prime Minister (Oxford University Press, 2020)
- Constitutional Practice (Oxford University Press, Third Edition, 1999)
- Constitutional Reform (Oxford University Press, Third Edition, 2008)
- Constitutional and Administrative Law, with Stanley Alexander de Smith (Oxford University Press, Eighth Edition, 1998)
- Ministers of the Crown (Oxford University Press, 1997)
- Constitutional Texts: Materials on Government and the Constitution (Oxford University Press, 1990)
