= Sheriffs Act 1293 =

Act of the Parliament of Ireland

Sheriffs Act 1293 (Note: Short title given by the Statute Law Revision Act 2007 (No. 28))
- Act of Parliament
- Parliament of Ireland
- Long title: None
- Citation: 21 Edw. 1 (I)
- Territorial extent: Ireland

Dates
- Royal assent: 1293
- Commencement: 1293

Other legislation
- Amended by: Statute Law Revision Act 2007

Status: Amended

Text of statute as originally enacted

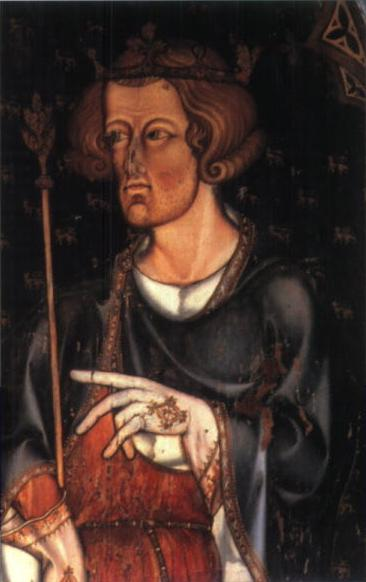
Edward I "Longshanks", who passed the Sheriffs Act.

The Sheriffs Act 1293 (21 Edw. 1 (I)) (Irish: Acht na Sirriam) is an act of the Parliament of Ireland in 1293, passed during the reign of Edward I as Lord of Ireland.

The act covered the appointment of sheriffs and bailiffs; alienation without royal licence; enfeoffment; forbade the seneschal of a liberty from also being Justice Itinerant or of the Bench; addressed the collection of the "fifteenth" tax; and took back royal land that had been rented out for too low a sum; and provided that justice.
