= Family Law Reform (Northern Ireland) Order 1977 =

Order in Council for Northern Ireland

- Statutory Instrument
- Parliament of the United Kingdom
- Citation: SI 1977/1250 (N.I. 17)
- Territorial extent: Northern Ireland

Dates
- Made: 26 July 1977
- Commencement: 26 July 1977 (arts. 1, 2) (Note: Article 1(2).); 1 January 1978 (parts II and IV) (Note: The Family Law Reform (1977 Order) (Commencement No. 1) Order (Northern Ireland) 1977 (SR 1977/343).); 1 March 1979 (part III) (Note: The Family Law Reform (1977 Order) (Commencement No. 2) Order (Northern Ireland) 1978 (SR 1978/377).)

Other legislation
- Amends: Wills Act 1837; Guardianship of Infants Act 1886; Legitimacy Act (Northern Ireland) 1928; Administration of Estates Act (Northern Ireland) 1955; Inheritance (Family Provision) Act (Northern Ireland) 1960
- Repeals/revokes: See § Repealed enactments
- Made under: Northern Ireland Act 1974
- Amended by: Inheritance (Provision for Family and Dependants) (Northern Ireland) Order 1979; Fines and Penalties (Northern Ireland) Order 1984; Mental Health (Northern Ireland) Order 1986; Human Fertilisation and Embryology Act 1990; Wills and Administration Proceedings (Northern Ireland) Order 1994; Children (Northern Ireland) Order 1995; Child Support, Pensions and Social Security Act (Northern Ireland) 2000; Family Law Act (Northern Ireland) 2001; Human Fertilisation and Embryology Act 2008; Northern Ireland Act 1998 (Devolution of Policing and Justice Functions) Order 2010

Status: Amended

Text of statute as originally enacted

Revised text of statute as amended

Text of the Family Law Reform (Northern Ireland) Order 1977 as in force today (including any amendments) within the United Kingdom, from legislation.gov.uk.

The Family Law Reform (Northern Ireland) Order 1977 (SI 1977/1250 (N.I. 17)) is an order in Council for Northern Ireland that reformed the law of Northern Ireland relating to illegitimacy, including the property and succession rights of children born outside marriage, and introduced provision for the use of blood tests, and later other scientific tests, to determine paternity in civil proceedings.

== Background ==
The Order was made under paragraph 1 of schedule 1 to the Northern Ireland Act 1974, during the period of direct rule in which legislation for Northern Ireland on transferred matters was made by Order in Council rather than by the Parliament of Northern Ireland or a devolved assembly. A draft of the Order was approved by a resolution of each House of Parliament, and it was made by the Queen in Council at Buckingham Palace on 26 July 1977.

== Provisions ==
=== Repealed enactments ===
Article 16 of the act repealed two obsolete enactments of the Parliament of Ireland, listed below.

Citation	Short title	Description	Extent of repeal
21 Hen. 3 (1237)	N/A	Custom of England that a person born out of wedlock cannot inherit, to be observed in Ireland.	The whole act.
22 Hen. 3 (1238)	N/A	Custom of England that the land of a bastard without an heir reverts to the lord, to be observed in Ireland.	The whole act.
