= Human Fertilisation and Embryology Act 2008 =

Act of the Parliament of the United Kingdom

Human Fertilisation and Embryology Act 2008 (Note: Section 69.)
- Act of Parliament
- Parliament of the United Kingdom
- Long title: An Act to amend the Human Fertilisation and Embryology Act 1990 and the Surrogacy Arrangements Act 1985; to make provision about the persons who in certain circumstances are to be treated in law as the parents of a child; and for connected purposes.
- Citation: 2008 c. 22
- Territorial extent: England and Wales; Scotland; Northern Ireland; (Note: Section 67.)

Dates
- Royal assent: 13 November 2008
- Commencement: Various (Note: Section 68.)
Other legislation
Amends	Legitimacy Act (Northern Ireland) 1928; Children and Young Persons (Scotland) Act 1937; Population (Statistics) Act 1938; Births and Deaths Registration Act 1953; Registration of Births, Deaths and Marriages (Special Provisions) Act 1957; Registration of Births, Deaths and Marriages (Scotland) Act 1965; Family Law Reform Act 1969; Congenital Disabilities (Civil Liability) Act 1976; Legitimacy Act 1976; Births and Deaths Registration (Northern Ireland) Order 1976; Family Law Reform (Northern Ireland) Order 1977; Magistrates' Courts Act 1980; Senior Courts Act 1981; British Nationality Act 1981; Family Law (Scotland) Act 1985; Surrogacy Arrangements Act 1985; Family Law Act 1986; Family Law Reform Act 1987; Adoption (Northern Ireland) Order 1987; Children Act 1989; Human Fertilisation and Embryology Act 1990; Environmental Protection Act 1990; Child Support Act 1991; Child Support (Northern Ireland) Order 1991; Age of Legal Capacity (Scotland) Act 1991; Human Fertilisation and Embryology (Disclosure of Information) Act 1992; Children (Scotland) Act 1995; Criminal Law (Consolidation) (Scotland) Act 1995; Children (Northern Ireland) Order 1995; Family Law Act 1996; Family Homes and Domestic Violence (Northern Ireland) Order 1998; Access to Justice Act 1999; Adults with Incapacity (Scotland) Act 2000; Criminal Justice and Police Act 2001; Family Law Act (Northern Ireland) 2001; Adoption and Children Act 2002; Human Fertilisation and Embryology (Deceased Fathers) Act 2003; Human Tissue Act 2004; Mental Capacity Act 2005; Adoption and Children (Scotland) Act 2007
Repeals/revokes	Human Reproductive Cloning Act 2001; Human Fertilisation and Embryology (Research Purposes) Regulations 2001
Amended by	Crime and Courts Act 2013; Marriage (Same Sex Couples) Act 2013; Marriage and Civil Partnership (Scotland) Act 2014 and Civil Partnership Act 2004 (Consequential Provisions and Modifications) Order 2014; Justice Act (Northern Ireland) 2015; Wales Act 2017; Human Fertilisation and Embryology Act 2008 (Remedial) Order 2018; Civil Partnership (Opposite-sex Couples) Regulations 2019; Marriage (Same-sex Couples) and Civil Partnership (Opposite-sex Couples) (Northern Ireland) Regulations 2019; Civil Partnership (Scotland) Act 2020 and Marriage and Civil Partnership (Scotland) Act 2014 (Consequential Modifications) Order 2022
Relates to	Legal Aid, Sentencing and Punishment of Offenders Act 2012; Crime and Courts Act 2013; Justice Act (Northern Ireland) 2015; Wales Act 2017; Human Fertilisation and Embryology Act 2008 (Remedial) Order 2018; Civil Partnership (Opposite-sex Couples) Regulations 2019; Marriage (Same-sex Couples) and Civil Partnership (Opposite-sex Couples) (Northern Ireland) Regulations 2019; Civil Partnership (Scotland) Act 2020 and Marriage and Civil Partnership (Scotland) Act 2014 (Consequential Modifications) Order 2022

Status: Amended

History of passage through Parliament

Text of statute as originally enacted

Revised text of statute as amended

The Human Fertilisation and Embryology Act 2008 (c. 22) is an act of the Parliament of the United Kingdom. The Act constitutes a major review and update of the Human Fertilisation and Embryology Act 1990. The Guardian described the bill as a ‘landmark piece of legislation’ intended to bring UK fertility law in line with rapidly advancing scientific practices.

According to the Department of Health, the Act's key provisions are:

- ensure that all human embryos outside the body—whatever the process used in their creation—are subject to regulation.
- ensure regulation of "human-admixed" embryos created from a combination of human and animal genetic material for research.
- ban sex selection of offspring for non-medical reasons. This puts into statute a ban on non-medical sex selection currently in place as a matter of HFEA policy. Sex selection is allowed for medical reasons—for example to avoid a serious disease that affects only males.
- recognise same-sex couples as legal parents of children conceived through the use of donated sperm, eggs or embryos. These provisions enable, for example, the civil partner of a woman who carries a child via IVF to be recognised as the child’s legal parent.
- retain a duty to take account of the welfare of the child in providing fertility treatment, but replace the reference to "the need for a father" with "the need for supportive parenting"—hence valuing the role of all parents
- alter the restrictions on the use of HFEA-collected data to help enable follow-up research of infertility treatment.

The Bill's discussion in Parliament did not permit time to debate whether it should extend abortion rights under the Abortion Act 1967 to also cover Northern Ireland. The 2008 Act does not alter the status quo.

The Act also repealed and replaced the Human Reproductive Cloning Act 2001.

The inclusion of hybrid embryo research provisions led to intense moral debates in Parliament, with one faction praising the potential for life-saving therapies and another warning against ‘unforeseen consequences'.

Under the act, new rules regarding the designation of a second parent in cases of IVF treatment came into force on 6 April 2009. Prior to these changes, UK law automatically recognized the husband in a married couple undergoing IVF as the child’s second legal parent. The 2008 Act extended this right to lesbian couples and single women, allowing them to nominate a second parent who was not necessarily a spouse or civil partner.

The Human Fertilisation and Embryology Authority (HFEA) advised prospective parents to consider delaying IVF treatment until the new regulations took effect, if they wished to take advantage of the updated second-parent provisions.
