= Great Charter of Ireland =

Act of the Parliament of Ireland

Magna Carta Hiberniae 1216 (Note: Short title given by the Statute Law Revision Act 2007 (No. 28))
- Parliament of Ireland
- Long title: None
- Citation: 1 Hen. 3 [P.R.O. Vol. 1]
- Territorial extent: Republic of Ireland; Northern Ireland

Dates
- Royal assent: 1216
- Commencement: 1216

Other legislation
- Amended by: Statute Law Revision Act 2007
- Relates to: Magna Carta (1215); Magna Carta (1217); Magna Carta (1297)

Status: Current legislation

Text of statute as originally enacted

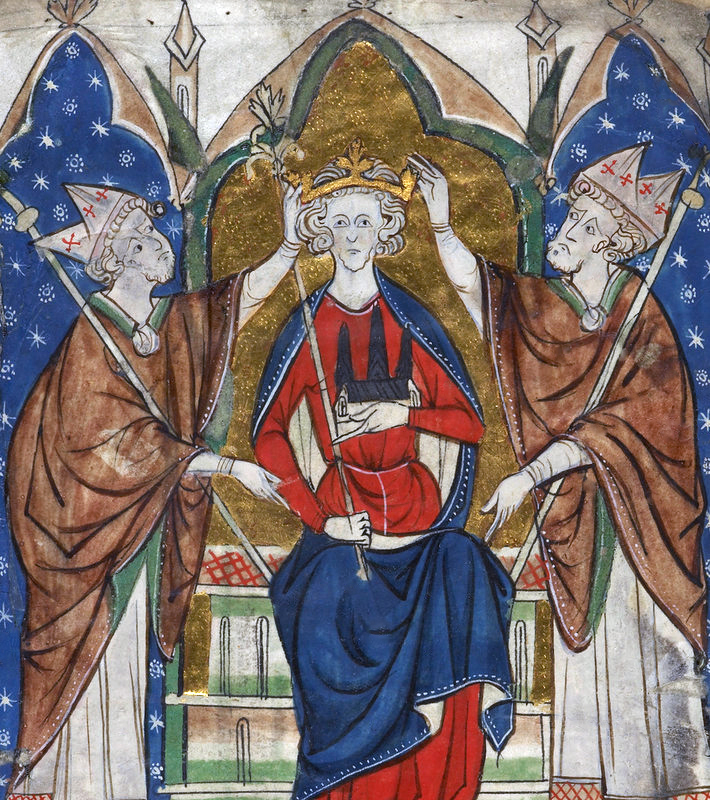
Coronation of Henry III, who issued the Magna Carta Hiberniae.

Magna Carta Hiberniae 1216 (or the Great Charter of Ireland) (1 Hen. 3 [P.R.O. Vol. 1]) is an issue of the English Magna Carta (or Great Charter of Liberties) in Ireland. King Henry III of England's charter of 1216 was issued for Ireland on 12 November 1216 but not transmitted to Ireland until February 1217; it secured rights for the Anglo-Norman magnates in Ireland. The charter was reissued in 1217 as in England. It was in effect the application of Magna Carta to Ireland, with appropriate substitutions (such as "Dublin" for "London", and "Irish Church" for "Church of England").

The only known copy of the charter was once to be found in the Red Book of the Dublin Court of Exchequer, a manuscript volume compiled in the fourteenth century. Scholars disagree over which of the textual differences between the English charter and the Irish version date from its original 1217 issue and which were inserted by later copyists. The Red Book was destroyed in the explosion at the Four Courts in Dublin, in 1922, but the text had been recorded by H. F. Berry in Early Statutes of Ireland (1907). Magna Carta Hiberniae 1216 (1 Hen. 3) is now a retained statute in the Republic of Ireland under the Statute Law Revision Act 2007, s.2(2)(a), Schedule 1.
