= Walter Merricks =

English lawyer (born 1945)

Walter Hugh Merricks CBE, who qualified as an English solicitor, has held a number of senior appointments in legal and public institutions, the best known being his tenure as the inaugural Chief Ombudsman of the Financial Ombudsman Service between 1999 and 2009. He was Chair of Impress, the Independent Monitor for the Press, and the law reform charity JUSTICE. He was a member of the Civil Aviation Authority's consumer panel until 2023. As class representative, he has filed a £14 billion class action claim on behalf of British consumers against Mastercard Incorporated before the Competition Appeal Tribunal.

He is currently Chair of the Hornsey Historical Society, and of the Class Representatives Network CIC. An active tennis player at the Coolhurst Lawn Tennis and Squash Club, he serves as the Club's Secretary. He also chairs his local residents' association, The Chine and Cascade Avenue Residents Association, part of the Rookfield Garden Village in Muswell Hill, London.

== Education ==
Born in 1945, he was educated at Bradfield College, Berkshire. After leaving in 1962 he volunteered as a teacher at Sadiq Public School, Bahawalpur, West Pakistan (now Pakistan) for Voluntary Service Overseas. He gained a 2:1 law degree at Trinity College, Oxford. While at Oxford he acted and performed in a number of revues and plays including productions at the Edinburgh Fringe. There he appeared as Polonius in the first production of Tom Stoppard's Rosencrantz and Guildenstern Are Dead. He went on to study at the College of Law and was articled to John Batt, solicitor of the firm Batt Holden of Wimbledon, following which he was admitted as a solicitor in 1970.

A scholarship from the Henry Malcolm Hubbard Trust in 1971 enabled him to spend a year studying legal institutions in Montreal, Quebec, where he worked at the Pointe St Charles office of Services Juridiques Communautaires, the first community law clinic in Canada.

== Career ==
Returning to the UK in 1972 he was appointed the inaugural director of the Camden Community Law Centre, the UK's first publicly funded law centre.

In 1975 he took up a post at Brunel University as a lecturer in law. Drawing on his law centre experience he devised and taught a course on Welfare Law.

In 1978 he was appointed a member of the Royal Commission on Criminal Procedure (chairman Sir Cyril Philips), the remit of which was to inquire into police powers and suspects' rights in criminal investigations; and into the arrangements for the prosecution of offences. Its recommendations led to legislation to codify police powers (Police and Criminal Evidence Act 1984) and the establishment of the Crown Prosecution Service (Prosecution of Offences Act 1985).

In 1979 he presented a 13 part BBC2 TV series, Circuit Eleven Miami, that featured the workings of the Florida criminal justice system and which included footage filmed inside Miami courtrooms. From 1982 to 1985 he worked as a freelance legal journalist and broadcaster, principally writing a weekly column for the New Law Journal.

In 1984 he was appointed a member of the Fraud Trials Committee. Its 1986 report led to the establishment of the Serious Fraud Office. While the majority of the committee recommended a judge-led Fraud Trials Tribunal to try serious fraud cases, he wrote a note of dissent opposing the abolition of jury trial.

In 1985 he was appointed to be Assistant Secretary-General at the Law Society of England and Wales. He remained at the Law Society heading the communications, and law and practice divisions until 1996 when he was appointed to be the UK's Insurance Ombudsman.

When it was decided in 1999 that the eight ombudsman schemes covering insurance, banking, building societies, personal investment and investment management were to be merged in the Financial Ombudsman Service, he was appointed as the first Chief Ombudsman to manage the merger and to lead the new organisation, a post he held until 2009.

In the service's first year the budget was £21.4m, staff numbers were 350 and the annual number of complaints was 28,400. Ten years later the budget was £90m, staff numbers were 1,060 and complaints had risen to 160,000. During this period the service had to handle high-profile surges of single issue complaints: these included those about pension mis-selling, dual mortgage rates, the Equitable Life affair, mortgage endowment mis-selling, "precipice" investment bonds, bank account default charges, and payment protection insurance.

From 2001 to 2004 he served as chair of the British and Irish Ombudsman Association.

== Non executive board roles ==
In 2009 he was appointed the founding chair of the Office of the Health Professions Adjudicator, a statutory body intended to provide independent adjudication of the fitness to practice of doctors and other health professions. The organisation was short-lived, being abolished in 2012 as part of the Coalition reform of public bodies.

Between 2010 and 2015 he was a member of the board of Ombudsman Services Ltd, the dispute resolver for communications, retail energy, property and other consumer sectors.

Between 2012 and 2017 he was a Commissioner (board member) of the Gambling Commission. The UK's betting and gaming regulator has a remit over the casino, lotteries, betting, arcades and bingo sectors, including regulation of the National Lottery operator.

Between 2011 and 2015 he served as inaugural chair of the trustee board of the Academy of Medical Royal Colleges. The Academy brings together the expertise of the medical Royal Colleges and Faculties to drive improvement in health and patient care through education, training and quality standards. The trustee board is responsible for its governance.

In November 2014 he was appointed to be Chair of the board of Impress, the Independent Monitor for the Press. In 2016 Impress was approved by the Press Recognition Panel as an independent and effective regulator, complying with the requirements of the Royal Charter on Self-Regulation of the Press.

== Service complaint review ==
Between 2011 and 2015 he was Service Complaint Adjudicator for the Legal Ombudsman, and since 2012 he has held a similar role for the Royal Institution of Chartered Surveyors and since 2019 he performs a similar function for the Financial Reporting Council.

== Independent review commissions ==
Following the collapse of the XL tour operator group of companies in 2009, which produced an unprecedented number of claims on the Civil Aviation Authority's ATOL consumer protection fund, the Authority commissioned him to review and report on lessons learned. In 2013 the British Copyright Council commissioned him to carry out an independent code review of the UK's copyright collecting societies.

== Consumer class action ==
In 2016 he applied as proposed class representative of 46 million UK consumers to bring an opt-out class action before the Competition Appeal Tribunal seeking damages of £14 billion from Mastercard Inc. This followed the finding that Mastercard had infringed competition law in the setting of the transaction fees it charged to retailers. The claim alleges that retailers passed on the costs of these fees to consumers in higher prices over a 16-year period. The progress of the claim is documented at mastercardconsumerclaim.co.uk.

On 3 December 2024, Mastercard announced that it had "reached an agreement in principle", to settle the lawsuit for £200 million, subject to the Competition Appeal Tribunal's approval. According to the Tribunal, the amount sought on behalf of the claimants from Mastercard was valued at about £10 billion pounds. The hearing for the Tribunal to decide if its accepts the settlement application is scheduled for 19 and 20 February 2025.

== Human Fertilisation and Embryology Authority ==
Between 2002 and 2008 he was a member of the Human Fertilisation and Embryology Authority, serving as its Interim Chair 2007–2008.

== Family background, family life ==
He was born into a well known East Sussex farming family centred near Rye where he was brought up. His father [Walter Richard] Dick Merricks farmed apples, hops and sheep, and pioneered innovative techniques for bulk apple handling, grassland management, and sheep handling and shearing. He met and subsequently married Olivia Montuschi becoming step-father to the young son of her first marriage. After being diagnosed infertile, he and his wife used donor insemination treatment to conceive their two subsequent children. With four other families in 1993 they founded the Donor Conception Network, a supportive network of now nearly 2,000 families with children conceived with donated sperm, eggs or embryos; people considering or undergoing donor fertility procedures; and donor conceived people. The charity supported the ending of the practice of anonymous donation, and emphasises the need to tell donor children early about how they were conceived. Olivia is practice consultant to the charity and he was chair of the trustees until 2017.

== Other charitable interest ==
He was a trustee and member of the executive board of JUSTICE, the all-party law reform and human rights organisation that works to strengthen the justice system – administrative, civil and criminal – in the United Kingdom.

== Publications ==
He has contributed numerous articles and chapters to publications on law reform administrative justice, financial services, and donor conception.

== Honours ==
He was appointed a CBE in 2007. He holds an honorary degree of Doctor of Laws from London Guildhall University. He is an honorary fellow of the Chartered Insurance Institute. In 2004 he was awarded the Achievement Award at the British Insurance Awards 2004. He has been honorary president of the British Insurance Law Association.
