= List of acts of the Parliament of Ireland, 1200–1299 =

This is a list of acts of the Parliament of Ireland for the years from 1200 to 1299.

The number shown by each act's title is its chapter number. Acts are cited using this number, preceded by the years of the reign during which the relevant parliamentary session was held; thus the act concerning assay passed in 1783 is cited as "23 & 24 Geo. 3 c. 23", meaning the 23rd act passed during the session that started in the 23rd year of the reign of George III and which finished in the 24th year of that reign. Note that the modern convention is to use Arabic numerals in citations (thus "40 Geo. 3" rather than "40 Geo. III"). Acts of the reign of Elizabeth I are formally cited without a regnal numeral in the Republic of Ireland.

Acts passed by the Parliament of Ireland did not have a short title; however, some of these acts have subsequently been given a short title by acts of the Parliament of the United Kingdom, acts of the Parliament of Northern Ireland, or acts of the Oireachtas. This means that some acts have different short titles in the Republic of Ireland and Northern Ireland respectively. Official short titles are indicated by the flags of the respective jurisdictions.

A number of the acts included in this list are still in force in Northern Ireland or the Republic of Ireland. Because these two jurisdictions are entirely separate, the version of an act in force in one may differ from the version in force in the other; similarly, an act may have been repealed in one but not in the other.

A number of acts passed by the Parliament of England also extended to Ireland during this period.

== 2 John (1200) ==
- Fortification of castles
- Outlawry
- Dublin Charter from King John

== 5 John (1204) ==
- Writs issued for a grant of an aid or subsidy
- Novel disseisin

== 6 John (1204) ==
- Fairs Act 1204^{(Republic of Ireland)} Erection of castle and fortifications at Dublin; establishment of fairs at Donnybrook, Waterford and Limerick.
- Writs made current; their limitation

== 9 John (1207) ==
- King's writs and pleas of the Crown
- Irish robbers, etc., to be dealt with according to the law of England
- Holding of markets

== 12 John (1210) ==
- English laws and customs should be observed

== 16 John (1214) ==
- City of Dublin Act 1214^{(Republic of Ireland)} Fair and bridge at Dublin.

== 17 John (1215) ==
- City of Dublin Act 1215^{(Republic of Ireland)} Annual rent for Dublin City.

== 18 John (1215) ==
- Fortification of lands

== 1 Hen. 3 (1216) ==
This session was also traditionally cited as 1 H. 3.

- Magna Carta Hiberniae 1216^{(Republic of Ireland)} or Great Charter of Ireland
- Irish liberties

== 2 Hen. 3 (1216-17) ==
This session was also traditionally cited as 2 H. 3.

- Elections or promotions in cathedrals
- Irish liberties
- Ecclesiastical jurisdiction

== 4 Hen. 3 (1220) ==
This session was also traditionally cited as 4 H. 3.

- River traffic

== 5 Hen. 3 (1221) ==
This session was also traditionally cited as 5 H. 3.

- Tolls on wool, hides and wine
- Itinerant justices

== 6 Hen. 3 (1222) ==
This session was also traditionally cited as 6 H. 3.

- Pleas of bounds in Ireland as in England
- Limitation of writs of mort d'ancestor as in England
- Freedom in Waterford, scot and lot, etc.

== 7 Hen. 3 (1223) ==
This session was also traditionally cited as 1 H. 3.

- Writ of bounds

== 10 Hen. 3 (1226) ==
This session was also traditionally cited as 10 H. 3.

- Laws and customs of England to be kept in Ireland

== 12 Hen. 3 (1227-28) ==
This session was also traditionally cited as 12 H. 3.

- English writs in Ireland
- King John's Charter as to observance of English laws and customs in Ireland to be observed
- Drogheda bridge and trade

== 13 Hen. 3 (1229) ==
This session was also traditionally cited as 13 H. 3.

- Mayor of Dublin Act 1229^{(Republic of Ireland)} Dublin Mayoralty established.
- Charter of Drogheda 1229^{(Republic of Ireland)} Charter from Hen. 3 for Drogheda towards Uriell.
- Custom of England — inheritance by younger son
- Confirmation of Dublin Charters

== 14 Hen. 3 (1230) ==
This session was also traditionally cited as 14 H. 3.

- Forests and woods in Leinster
- Dublin tallage

== 17 Hen. 3 (1233) ==
This session was also traditionally cited as 17 H. 3.

- Great Galley of Dublin

== 18 Hen. 3 (1234) ==
This session was also traditionally cited as 18 H. 3.

- Holy Trinity Church Act 1234^{(Republic of Ireland)} Alteration of Dublin street.
- Dublin merchandise
- Pleas of lay fee and advowson of churches not to be pleaded in a court Christian

== 19 Hen. 3 (1234) ==
This session was also traditionally cited as 19 H. 3.

- Writ as to making of bounds to run in Ireland as in England
- Criminal law
- Dublin ale-custom

== 20 Hen. 3 (1236) ==
This session was also traditionally cited as 20 H. 3.

- Concerning coparceners.
- Limitation of writs in Ireland.
- Observance in Ireland of Statute of Merton.

== 21 Hen. 3 (1237) ==
This session was also traditionally cited as 21 H. 3.

- Concerning those born before wedlock – repealed by Family Law Reform (Northern Ireland) Order 1977 (SI 1977/1250 (N.I. 17))
- Writ of bounds.

== 22 Hen. 3 (1238) ==
This session was also traditionally cited as 22 H. 3.

- Inheritance of bastard – repealed by Family Law Reform (Northern Ireland) Order 1977 (SI 1977/1250 (N.I. 17))

== 25 Hen. 3 (1241) ==
This session was also traditionally cited as 25 H. 3.

- Galleys of Dublin, Waterford, Drogheda, Cork and Limerick.

== 27 Hen. 3 (1243) ==
This session was also traditionally cited as 27 H. 3.

- Liffey fishery.

== 28 Hen. 3 (1244) ==
This session was also traditionally cited as 28 H. 3.

- Weights and measures.

== 30 Hen. 3 (1245) ==
This session was also traditionally cited as 30 H. 3.

- Water for City and castle of Dublin.

== 30 Hen. 3 (1246) ==
- Exchequer fixed at Dublin – supplies from Ireland, etc.
- Laws and customs of England to be observed in Ireland.

== 31 Hen. 3 (1247) ==
This session was also traditionally cited as 31 H. 3.

- Charter of Drogheda 1247^{(Republic of Ireland)} Charter for Drogheda towards Meath.

== 34 Hen. 3 (1250) ==
This session was also traditionally cited as 34 H. 3.

- Dublin traffic.

== 36 Hen. 3 (1252) ==
This session was also traditionally cited as 36 H. 3.

- Dublin Fair Act 1252^{(Republic of Ireland)} Fair at Dublin.
- Protection for the King's citizens and the men of Dublin; judiciary of Ireland not to molest them contrary to the charters of the King's predecessors.
- Tolls at Dublin fairs and markets.

== Hen. 3 (Uncertain date circa 1252) ==
- Tolls at Dublin fairs and markets

== 37 Hen. 3 (1253) ==
This session was also traditionally cited as 37 H. 3.

- Charter of Drogheda 1253^{(Republic of Ireland)} Charter of Drogheda towards Uriell.
- Lands of King
- Weights and measures

== 38 Hen. 3 (1254) ==
This session was also traditionally cited as 38 H. 3.

- Dublin, Limerick and Athlone granted to Prince Edward

== 48 Hen. 3 (1264) ==
This session was also traditionally cited as 48 H. 3.

- Each person should recover his estate in lands, tenements, castles, wardships, goods and chattels, as the same were on the day of St. Nicholas

== 53 Hen. 3 (1269) ==
This session was also traditionally cited as 52 H. 3.

- Uniform weights and measures throughout Ireland

== 2 Edw. 1 (1274) ==
- Appointing and removing sheriffs and other ministers of the King

== 3 Edw. 1 (1275) ==
- Observance in Ireland of Statute on Grant of Custom on exported wool, etc.

== 4 Edw. 1 (1276) ==
- Office of Water Bailiff

== 5 Edw. 1 (1277) ==
- Weights and measures in Ireland

== 6 Edw. 1 (1278) ==
- Traffic and merchandise

== 8 Edw. 1 (1280) ==
- Dublin Fair Act 1280^{(Republic of Ireland)} Traffic and merchandise.
- Office of Water Bailiff

== 10 Edw. 1 (1281-82) ==
- Mill at Dublin

== 12 Edw. 1 (1284) ==
- Observance in Ireland of Statute of Rutland
- Dublin murage

== 13 Edw. 1 (1285) ==
- Observance in Ireland of Statute of Westminster I and Statute of Gloucester
- Observance in Ireland of Statute of Westminster II
- Writ for observance in Ireland of statutes of Westminster, Gloucester and those of Merchants
- Landlord and tenant customs

== 17 Edw. 1 (1288) ==
- False money

== 18 Edw. 1 (1290) ==
- Collection and payment of tithes and obventions
- Extension of Dublin murage

== 19 Edw. 1 (1291) ==
- Robert de Bree
- Articles of the clergy
- Freedom of movement of the French in the realm

== 20 Edw. 1 (1292) ==
- City of Limerick Act 1292^{(Republic of Ireland)} An Act concerning the liberties of the citizens of Limerick.

== 21 Edw. 1 (1293) ==
- Sheriffs Act 1293^{(Republic of Ireland)} Appointment of sheriffs and bailiffs.
- Lands held of the King in chief: alienation without licence
- No seneschal to be Justice where franchises to be tried
- Collection of the “Fifteenth” (taxation)
- Resumption and reletting lands
- Fees of justices, etc., payable at end of term

== 22 Edw. 1 (1294) ==
- Treasurer and Barons of the Exchequer to sell merchandise, goods, chattels and debts of merchants and other foreigners
- Treasurer and Barons of the Exchequer to make provision that all merchants who export from Ireland wool, hides, etc., have sufficient security not to export them to France
- King commands that the money arising from the issues of Ireland be employed for sending corn, wines, meat and other victuals from Ireland to Wales
- Export duties during war for wools, hides, etc.

== 23 Edw. 1 (1295) ==
- Dublin murage

== 25 Edw. 1 (1297) ==
- Division of counties and better rule of the realm
- Dublin murage

== 26 Edw. 1 (1297) ==
- Export duties during war for wools, skins, hides, etc.

== 27 Edw. 1 (1299) ==
- Against false money and for regulation of the currency
- Money
- Ordinances made as to Peter de Bermyngham having additional forces against the Irish felons, etc.
- Ban on use of foreign base coins (pollards and crokards)
- Application in Ireland of Statute on Justices of Assize

== 28 Edw. 1 (1300) ==
- Custom of Ireland as to goods of testator
- Export of silver
- Money raised to finance suppression of rebellion in Scotland
- Ban on use of foreign base coins (pollards and crokards)
- Free Hostelry of Knights of St. John

== See also ==
- List of acts of the Parliament of Ireland
- List of acts of the Oireachtas
- List of legislation in the United Kingdom
