= Tourn =

Medieval event

The tourn (tour, turn) was the bi-annual inspection of the hundreds of his shire made by the sheriff in medieval England. During it he would preside over the especially full meetings of the hundred court (more normally three-weekly) which met during the tourn at Easter and Michaelmas.

== Origins ==
The tourn is first recorded by that name in 1205, but Frederic William Maitland considered that it was already in action at the time of the 1166 Assize of Clarendon. Anglo-Saxon precedents for the tourn, in the form of exceptional shrieval holdings of the hundred court, are however already apparent by the early 11th century.

== Profits and abuses ==
A central part of the tourn was known as 'views of frankpledge', when the sheriff looked into the frankpledge or frith-borh system, for which all freemen and suitors of the hundred, as well as the reeve and four representatives from each vill, were meant to be present. Fines for non-attendance, the frankpledge penny, and penalties from criminals presented, all added up to sources of profit from the tourn, which sheriffs were naturally inclined to capitalise on.

Among the abuses that followed were multiplication of the number of tourn sessions and the exaction of money for non-attendance: one sheriff went so far as to extend the tourn to a county (Northumberland) where it was previously unknown, to multiply fines for non-attendance from the unwary. Unsurprisingly, attempted restrictions on the tourn formed a substantial part of the constitutional struggle of the 13th century. - Magna Carta insisting on no more than a bi-annual tourn, with fees for view of frankpledge restricted to those of Henry II's time. The Baronial Opposition reiterated the earlier points, and added to the classes of people exempt from attendance at the tourn – matters so popular that the victorious royalists took them up unchanged in the Statute of Marlborough.

== Geographical expansion/Temporal decline ==
The second half of the 13th century saw the tourn extended to Northern counties and to North Wales, (though not to the southern principality).

Later however the importance of the tourn (as of frankpledge) went into decline; and under Edward IV its legal scope was formally delimited (though not entirely removed).

== See also ==
- Court leet
- Hue and cry
- Hundred Court
