= Human Fertilisation and Embryology Authority =

UK regulatory body

Non-departmental public body overview
- Formed: 1990
- Headquarters: 2nd floor 2 Redman Place London E20 1JQ United Kingdom
- Non-departmental public body executive: Julia Chain, Chair
- Parent department: Department of Health and Social Care
- Website: www.hfea.gov.uk

The Human Fertilisation and Embryology Authority (HFEA) is an executive non-departmental public body of the Department of Health and Social Care in the United Kingdom. It is a statutory body that regulates and inspects all clinics in the United Kingdom providing in vitro fertilisation (IVF), artificial insemination and the storage of human eggs, sperm or embryos. It also regulates human embryo research.

== Background to the establishment of the HFEA ==
After the birth of Louise Brown, the world's first IVF baby, in 1978, there was concern about the implications of this new technology. In 1982, the UK government formed a committee chaired by philosopher Mary Warnock to look into the issues and see what action needed to be taken.

In the years following the Warnock report, proposals were brought forward by the government in the publication of a white paper Human Fertilisation and Embryology: A Framework for Legislation in 1987. The Human Fertilisation and Embryology Act 1990 was drafted taking the report into account.

== Legal framework ==
=== Human Fertilisation and Embryology Act 1990 ===
The 1990 Act provided for the establishment of the Human Fertilisation and Embryology Authority (HFEA), an executive, non-departmental public body, the first statutory body of its type in the world. The HFEA is the independent regulator for IVF treatment and human embryo research and came into effect on 1 August 1991. The 1990 Act ensured the regulation, through licensing, of:

- the creation of human embryos outside the body and their use in treatment and research
- the use of donated gametes and embryos
- the storage of gametes and embryos.

The Act also requires the HFEA keep a database of every IVF treatment carried out since that date and a database relating to all cycles and use of donated gametes (egg and sperm).

=== Cloning ===
In 2001, the Human Fertilisation and Embryology (Research Purposes) Regulations 2001/188 extended the purposes for which embryo research could be licensed to include "increasing knowledge about the development of embryos", "increasing knowledge about serious disease", and "enabling any such knowledge to be applied in developing treatments for serious disease".

This allows researchers to carry out embryonic stem cell research and therapeutic cloning providing that an HFEA Licence Committee considers the use of embryos necessary or desirable for one of these purposes of research.

The Human Reproductive Cloning Act 2001 was introduced to explicitly prohibit reproductive cloning in the UK, but it was repealed by the Human Fertilisation and Embryology Act 2008.

=== Donor anonymity ===
In 2004, the Human Fertilisation and Embryology Authority (Disclosure of Donor Information) Regulations 2004/1511, enabled donor-conceived children to access the identity of their sperm, egg or embryo donor upon reaching the age of 18.

The Regulations were implemented on 1 April 2005 and any donor who donated sperm, eggs or embryos from that date onwards is, by law, identifiable. Since that date, any person born as a result of donation is entitled to request and receive the donor's name and last known address, once they reach the age of 18.

=== European Union Tissues and Cells Directive ===
The European Union Tissues and Cells Directives (EUTCD) introduced common safety and quality standards for human tissues and cells across the European Union (EU).

The purpose of the directives was to facilitate a safer and easier exchange of tissues and cells (including human eggs and sperm) between member states and to improve safety standards for European citizens. The EUTCD was adopted by the Council of Ministers on 2 March 2004 and published in the Official Journal of the European Union on 7 April 2004. Member States were obliged to comply with its provisions from 7 April 2006.

=== Human Fertilisation and Embryology Act 2008 ===
In 2005, the House of Commons Science and Technology Select Committee published a report on Human Reproductive Technologies and the Law.

This inquiry investigated the legislative framework provided by the 1990 Act and challenges presented by technological advance and "recent changes in ethical and societal attitudes".

In light of the Committee's report, and legislative changes that had already been made, the Department of Health undertook a review of the 1990 Act. They then held a public consultation based on their review of the Act, and following this published a White Paper, Review of the Human Fertilisation and Embryology Act, within which Government presented its initial proposals to revise the legislation.

A Joint Committee of both houses scrutinised the Government's recommendations, and provided its views on what ought to be the final form of the Bill to be brought to parliament.

The Bill was finally brought to the House of Lords in November 2007, passing through the House of Commons through Spring and Autumn of 2008, and finally receiving Royal Assent on 13 November 2008. The HFE Act 2008 updates the law to ensure it is fit for purpose in the 21st century. It is divided into three parts:

1. amendments to the Human Fertilisation and Embryology Act 1990
2. parenthood
3. miscellaneous and general.

The main new elements of the Act are:

- ensuring that the creation and use of all human embryos outside the body – whatever the process used in their creation – are subject to regulation
- a ban on selecting the sex of offspring for social reasons
- continuing to require that clinics take account of "the welfare of the child" when providing fertility treatment, and replacing the previous requirement that they also take account of the child's "need for a father" with "supportive parenting"
- allowing for the recognition of both partners in a same-sex relationship as legal parents of children conceived through the use of donated sperm, eggs or embryos
- enabling people in same sex relationships and unmarried couples to apply for an order allowing for them to be treated as the parents of a child born using a surrogate
- changing restrictions on the use of data collected by the HFEA to make it easier to conduct research using this information
- provisions clarifying the scope of legitimate embryo research activities, including regulation of "human admixed embryos" (embryos combining both human and animal material).

== Current responsibilities ==
The current statutory functions of the HFEA, as a regulator under the HFE Acts 1990 and 2008 and other legislation include:

- license and monitor clinics carrying out in vitro fertilisation (IVF) and donor insemination
- license and monitor establishments undertaking human embryo research
- maintain a register of licences held by clinics, research establishments and storage centres
- regulate storage of gametes (eggs and sperm) and embryos
- implement the requirements of the European Union Tissue and Cells Directive (EUTCD) to relicense IVF clinics and to license Intrauterine Insemination (IUI), Gamete Intrafallopian Transfer (GIFT) and other services.

== Policy decisions ==
- As of 2017, centres receiving sperm donation could distribute sperm to no more families than the number specified by the donor, and the donor could not specify more than ten.
- In October and November 2007, the HFEA decided on a policy to reduce multiple births from fertility treatment. This forms part of a wider national strategy to reduce the risk of multiple births from fertility treatment involving professional bodies, patient groups and NHS-funding bodies.

Multiple pregnancy is the single biggest risk to patients and children born as a result of fertility treatment. Women undergoing IVF treatment are twenty times more likely to have a multiple birth than if they conceive naturally.

After carefully considering views from clinics, patients and professional bodies, the HFEA decided to set a maximum multiple birth rate that clinics should not exceed, which will be lowered each year. All clinics will have their own strategy setting out how they will lower the multiple birth rate in their clinic by identifying the patients for whom single embryo transfer is the most appropriate treatment. The HFEA aims to reduce multiple births from IVF treatment to 10% over a period of years.

- In September 2007, after an extensive consultation with the UK public, the Authority decided that there is no fundamental reason to prevent cytoplasmic hybrid research. Individual research teams should be able to undertake research projects involving the creation of cytoplasmic hybrid embryos, provided that an HFEA Licence Committee is satisfied that their planned research is necessary and desirable. They must also meet the overall standards required by the HFEA for any embryo research. In January 2008, the HFEA granted licenses to Newcastle University and King's College London to carry out cytoplasmic hybrid research projects
- In 2007 the Authority agreed to allow women to be able to donate their eggs to research projects, provided that there are strong safeguards in place to ensure the women are properly informed of the risks of the procedure and are properly protected from coercion
- In 2006, the HFEA approved in principle the screening of embryos for genes that may lead to certain cancers in middle age
- In 2005, the HFEA granted a licence to treat mitochondrial diseases by allowing researchers to attempt to create an embryo with two genetic mothers
- In 2004, the HFEA granted British scientists a licence to produce cloned human cells, making it only the second country in the world to permit such a procedure

== Current and former members ==
- Chair – Julia Chain
- Deputy Chair – Catharine Seddon
- Chief Executive – Peter Thompson

Former Chairs include Professor Lisa Jardine, Walter Merricks, Shirley Harrison, Lord Harries, Dame Suzi Leather, Baroness Deech, Sir Colin Campbell and Sally Cheshire.

Other notable former members include Professor Emily Jackson and Margaret Auld, former Chief Nursing Officer for Scotland.

== See also ==
- Assisted Human Reproduction Canada
- Evans v. the United Kingdom
- Intersex rights in the United Kingdom
