= Fairs Act 1204 =

Irish statute

- Act of Parliament
- Parliament of Ireland
- Long title: An Act for the erection of castle and fortifications at Dublin; establishment of fairs at Donnybrook, Waterford and Limerick
- Citation: 6 John (1204)
- Territorial extent: Ireland

Dates
- Royal assent: 1204
- Commencement: 1204

Other legislation
- Amended by: Statute Law Revision Act 2007

Status: Current legislation

Text of statute as originally enacted

The Fairs Act 1204 (6 John) is an Irish statute enacted in 1204, the 6th year of the reign of John, King of England. It provided for the erection of a castle and fortifications at Dublin and the establishment of fairs at Donnybrook, Waterford and Limerick. It is currently the oldest statute in force on the Irish statute book by virtue of the Statute Law Revision Act 2007.
