= A.G.R. v. D.R.H =

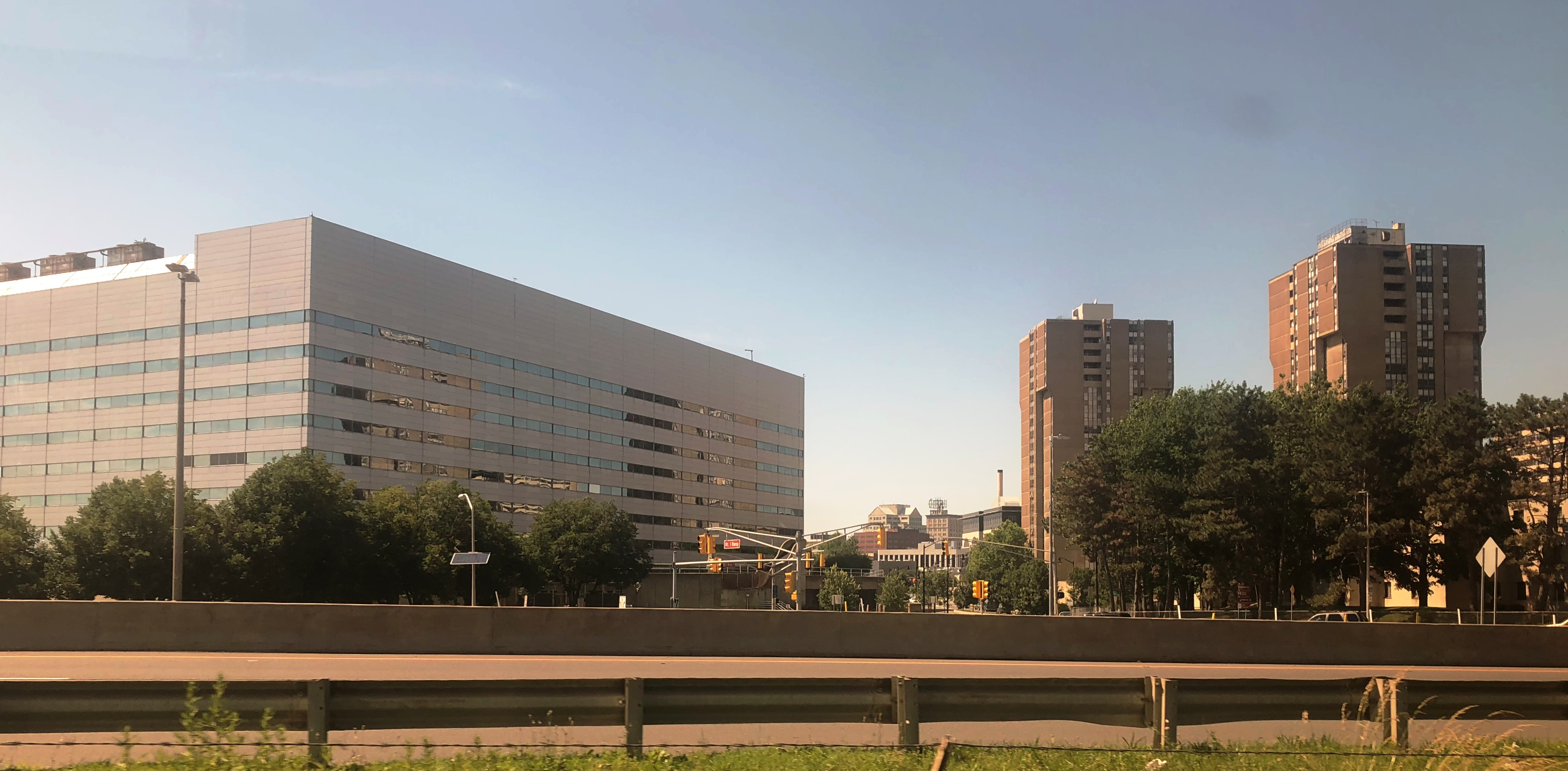
- Court: Superior Court of New Jersey
- Full case name: Robinson v. Hollingsworth
- Decided: December 23, 2009

Case opinions
- Decision by: Judge Francis Schultz

A.G.R. v. D.R.H & S.H. (also known as Robinson v. Hollingsworth) is a ruling by the Superior Court of New Jersey, Hudson County Vicinage, and is the first precedent regarding gestational surrogacy in New Jersey. The ruling was handed down by Judge Francis Schultz on December 23, 2009.

== Background ==
Donald Robinson and Sean Hollingsworth were married in a civil ceremony in California and moved to New Jersey. They later decided to seek out a surrogate mother in order to have children of their own. In 2005, Robinson's sister, Angela Robinson, after falling on hard times and having moved to New Jersey to be near her brother, agreed to be a surrogate for the couple. Robinson later gave birth to twin girls in 2006. Sean supplied the sperm and an anonymous donor supplied the egg. Before the embryo was implanted, Robinson signed a contract stating she would carry the pregnancy to term and relinquish her parental rights in favor of her brother and Hollingsworth.

However, after the birth, Robinson claimed she was coerced into entering into the agreement and she felt uncomfortable with Robinson-Hollingsworth and Hollingsworth raising the children due to her religious beliefs against homosexuality. In 2007, she sought custody and challenged the agreement in court, arguing that gestational surrogacy contracts are invalid in New Jersey.

== Ruling and reaction ==
Judge Schultz ruled in favor of Angela Robinson, expanding the Baby M precedent beyond a genetically related surrogate mother and declaring gestational surrogacy contracts to be a violation of public policy. As noted by legal scholar Jonathan Turley, this ruling creates a split between those states that honor gestational surrogacy and those that do not.

Attorney Harold Cassidy, who had represented both Robinson here and Mary Beth Whitehead in the Baby M case, praised the ruling and described gestational surrogacy contracts as "the exploitation of women."

Despite finding that Angela Robinson was the legal mother of the twins, a 2011 ruling confirmed that the children's best interests would be served by awarding their father full legal custody - which was also the outcome in Baby M. The twins will continue to reside with Sean and his husband.

== See also ==
- Surrogacy
- In vitro fertilization
- Surrogacy: Legal issues
- Surrogacy laws by country: United States
