= McKenna West surrogacy case =

2026 custody litigation case

In 2026, a surrogacy arrangement between surrogate McKenna West and intended parents Nausheen Gilkar and Omar Ahmed led to custody litigation in California, Alaska, and Texas, as well as widespread media attention and ethical debate surrounding surrogacy, abortion, and bodily autonomy. The dispute began after the fetus West was carrying was diagnosed with hypoplastic left heart syndrome, a congenital heart defect, and the couple asked her to terminate the pregnancy under a clause in their surrogacy agreement. West did not have the abortion, instead traveling to Texas, which bans most abortions. She gave birth in Dallas in August 2026, at which point custody was formally awarded to the genetic parents Gilkar and Ahmed.

== Background ==
McKennna West, the gestational surrogate, was a 28-year-old cardiac nurse, based in Alaska at the time of the surrogacy agreement.

Nausheen Gilkar and Omar Ahmed, the genetic parents of the child at the center of the case, contracted a surrogate after experiencing repeated infertility. The couple is based in Los Angeles, California.

== Timeline ==
In August 2025, the parties signed a surrogacy agreement that included stipulation for termination of pregnancy in the event of fetal anomaly, as well as the intent for West to give birth in her home state of Alaska.

West successfully conceived via IVF with Gilkar's egg and Ahmed's sperm. The 20 week fetal scan showed anomalies leading to a diagnosis of hypoplastic left heart syndrome. Gilkar and Ahmed requested a termination after receiving the diagnosis. West initially agreed and made at least two appointments in different stages, ultimately declining to proceed with the termination. She later cited concerns that she would “not be able to live with” herself had she gone through with the termination. At some point after this, West cut off contact with Gilkar and Ahmed.

In May 2026, Gilkar and Ahmed filed for a court order in California seeking to be designated as the legal parents of the unborn child. West responded in June with a lawsuit in Alaska seeking to stop the California proceedings and be granted custody. In July, Gilkar and Ahmed filed a counterclaim to the Alaska suit, reiterating their request to be designated the child's legal parents and seeking $100,000 in damages from West.

At 34 weeks pregnant in late July, West moved to Dallas, Texas with the intent to deliver there. As part of the ongoing Texas court proceedings regarding the status of the unborn child, a temporary restraining order granted against West by a Dallas County judge, preventing her from representing herself as the child's parent or attempting to make medical decisions for him. On August 10, Texas Attorney General Ken Paxton filed a brief requesting that the judge issue an order directing that the infant receive stabilizing care post-birth. The order was granted.

On August 12, the boy was born in Dallas and Gilkar and Ahmed named him Rumi; West and anti-abortion activists covering the case referred to him as Gabriel.

Paxton withdrew from the case in August 19, stating that his office had achieved its goal behind the initial brief.

Approximately one week after Rumi's birth, West penned an op ed in the New York Post claiming that Gilkar and Ahmed had refused to commit to authorizing medical treatment for the infant once born; this claim was disputed in Gilkar and Ahmed's subsequent countersuit.

On September 1, a Texas court dismissed West's request for custody, affirming an earlier ruling in the California case. West indicated her intent to bring the request before the Supreme Court following the ruling. On September 22, the United States Supreme Court, in an order authored by Justice Elena Kagan, declined to hear West's request for an emergency order, meaning Gilkar and Ahmed's custody would stand.

== See also ==
- Surrogacy legal issues
- Surrogacy laws in the United States
- Baby M
