= Mary Whitehead =

Mary Whitehead may refer to:

- Mary Beth Whitehead, American surrogate mother
- Mary Whitehead, in the 1969 US comedy film Angel in My Pocket, played by Lee Meriwether
