= Marybeth Whitehead =

American woman central to the Baby M surrogacy case

Mary Beth Whitehead
- Born: Mary Beth Messer; 1957/1958; New Jersey, U.S.
- Known for: Litigant in the Baby M surrogacy case (1986–1988)

Mary Beth Whitehead (born Mary Beth Messer; 1957/1958) is an American woman whose dispute with William and Elizabeth Stern over a traditional surrogacy agreement became known as the Baby M case. In 1988, the Supreme Court of New Jersey voided the paid surrogacy contract as contrary to law and public policy, restored Whitehead's parental status with visitation, and awarded custody to the child's biological father, William Stern, based on the child's best interests.

The case drew intense national attention and has been widely discussed in news coverage and legal scholarship for its influence on U.S. surrogacy law and debates over reproductive rights and adoption policy.

== Background ==
Whitehead was born Mary Beth Messer in New Jersey, the sixth of eight children in a large working-class family. She left school at 15, married young, and became a mother at 17. In her memoir A Mother’s Story, she later wrote that she had “grown up believing that the purpose of my life was to have children.”

Her parents, Joseph and Catherine Messer, lived in Holiday, Florida, where they followed the Baby M hearings from afar. Contemporary reports described the Messers watching televised coverage of the New Jersey court proceedings and reacting with shock as Judge Harvey Sorkow awarded custody of the infant to William Stern and upheld the surrogacy contract. Catherine Messer was quoted as saying she was “devastated” by the decision and felt her granddaughter had been “stolen,” while Joseph Messer questioned what rights grandparents possessed under such rulings. The couple's televised reaction, described by national reporters, became part of the broader human-interest coverage surrounding the Baby M case.

During cross-examination, attorney Harold Skoloff questioned Whitehead about her brother, Donald Messer, whom the court record described as having “abducted his two children from Monmouth County and taken them to Florida,” during a custody dispute. The line of questioning was viewed by contemporaneous reporters as an attempt to draw a parallel between Messer's actions and Whitehead's own decision to flee to Florida with Baby M, suggesting a family pattern of defying court orders. Whitehead testified that she had been unaware of her brother's situation. Two other siblings were also mentioned in press coverage for separate legal difficulties that year, illustrating the family's struggles during the period.

Whitehead, married and the mother of two, entered into a traditional surrogacy contract arranged through the Infertility Center of New York. The agreement provided that she would be artificially inseminated with William Stern's sperm, carry the pregnancy, and, after birth, relinquish her parental rights so that Stern's wife, Elizabeth, could adopt the child; Whitehead was to receive $10,000 plus expenses.

== Baby M Birth and dispute ==
Whitehead gave birth to a girl on March 27, 1986; she named the child Sara Elizabeth, while the Sterns called her Melissa. Within days, Whitehead reconsidered her decision to relinquish custody. After an initial handover, she sought the infant's return and, with her husband, left New Jersey for Florida with the baby, triggering emergency proceedings and national media attention.

== Trial ==
A nonjury trial in New Jersey Superior Court in early 1987 enforced the surrogacy contract, terminated Whitehead's parental rights, and awarded custody to William Stern, permitting Elizabeth Stern to adopt the child. The case drew extensive commentary about gender, class, and the ethics of commercial surrogacy. Coverage included reporting on trial summations by counsel for both sides and debates among feminists, ethicists, and legal scholars.

== New Jersey Supreme Court decision ==
On appeal, the Supreme Court of New Jersey unanimously reversed key parts of the trial ruling in 1988. The court held that the paid surrogacy contract violated statutes prohibiting payments connected with adoption, conflicted with laws requiring parental unfitness before termination of parental rights, and was contrary to public policy; however, the court affirmed the award of custody to William Stern based on the child's best interests and restored Whitehead's parental status with visitation. The decision rapidly became a leading authority in American surrogacy law and is frequently cited in scholarly analysis.

== Aftermath and later life ==
Following the litigation, Whitehead—by then sometimes identified as Mary Beth Whitehead-Gould—spoke publicly about her experience and life after the case, including in a 1989 feature that reported she was expecting another child and adjusting to the outcome while maintaining visitation rights. Whitehead also co-authored a memoir recounting her perspective on the case.

== Legacy ==
The Baby M controversy accelerated state-by-state consideration of surrogacy laws and shaped later policy debates. Scholars have treated the case as a touchstone for the ethics of paid surrogacy, the commodification of reproduction, and parental rights in nontraditional family formation. Popular coverage, including news features and retrospectives, continued to revisit the case as surrogacy became more common in the United States.

== In popular culture ==
The case inspired the ABC miniseries Baby M (1988), part of the broader media coverage that brought surrogacy debates to national attention.

== See also ==
- In re Baby M
- Surrogacy in the United States
- Adoption law in the United States
