= Surrogacy strike =

A surrogacy strike is a labor strike of surrogates. It can include an abortion, but more often involves withholding of the behavioral or emotional labor generally expected of surrogates.

While altruistic and commercial surrogacies are generally not regulated as forms of work, some advocates like the feminist Sophie Lewis argue that the viability of labor actions like strikes (for example by abortion or by refusing to give birth in a manner that the intended parents want) justify its classification as work, while others draw on the "Sex Work Is Work" movement as a comparison.

Sometimes the term "surrogacy strike" also refers to a more conventional labor strike that is done in support of surrogacy, as in the case of the 2018 Israeli LGBTQ strike.

== Methods ==
Apart from the gestational labor itself, many surrogates are expected by the intended parents or the surrogacy clinic to engage or to not engage in certain behaviors (e.g. to do yoga or to not consume alcohol or to travel) or to manage emotions by letting the intended parents vicariously experience the pregnancy through them. Any of those three categories of labor can be withheld, although some argue that since gestation can't be paused only aborted this doesn't qualify as a kind of strike. Since some behaviors are necessary for the health of the fetus, it is argued that strikes based on these are unethical.

Surrogacy is usually only between a given surrogate and the intended parents, but if regulated accordingly a surrogates' union can engage in sectoral bargaining by representing many or most surrogates in a country. A union can further act as an experienced middleman for people who want to provide or to contract a surrogacy.

If a commercial surrogacy was brokered by a specialized clinic the surrogate sometimes lives with other surrogates of the clinic at a surrogacy hostel, which often causes informal unions to form.

== Criticism ==
Since anti-surrogacy activists generally want to abolish surrogacy they therefore also oppose its commercialization, including usually surrogacy strikes. Anti-abortion activists oppose the option of striking by abortion and some Marxists criticize that using one would not cause it to qualify as a strike.

== See also ==
- Sophie Lewis
