= Surrogacy laws by country =

Legal status of pregnancy surrogacy

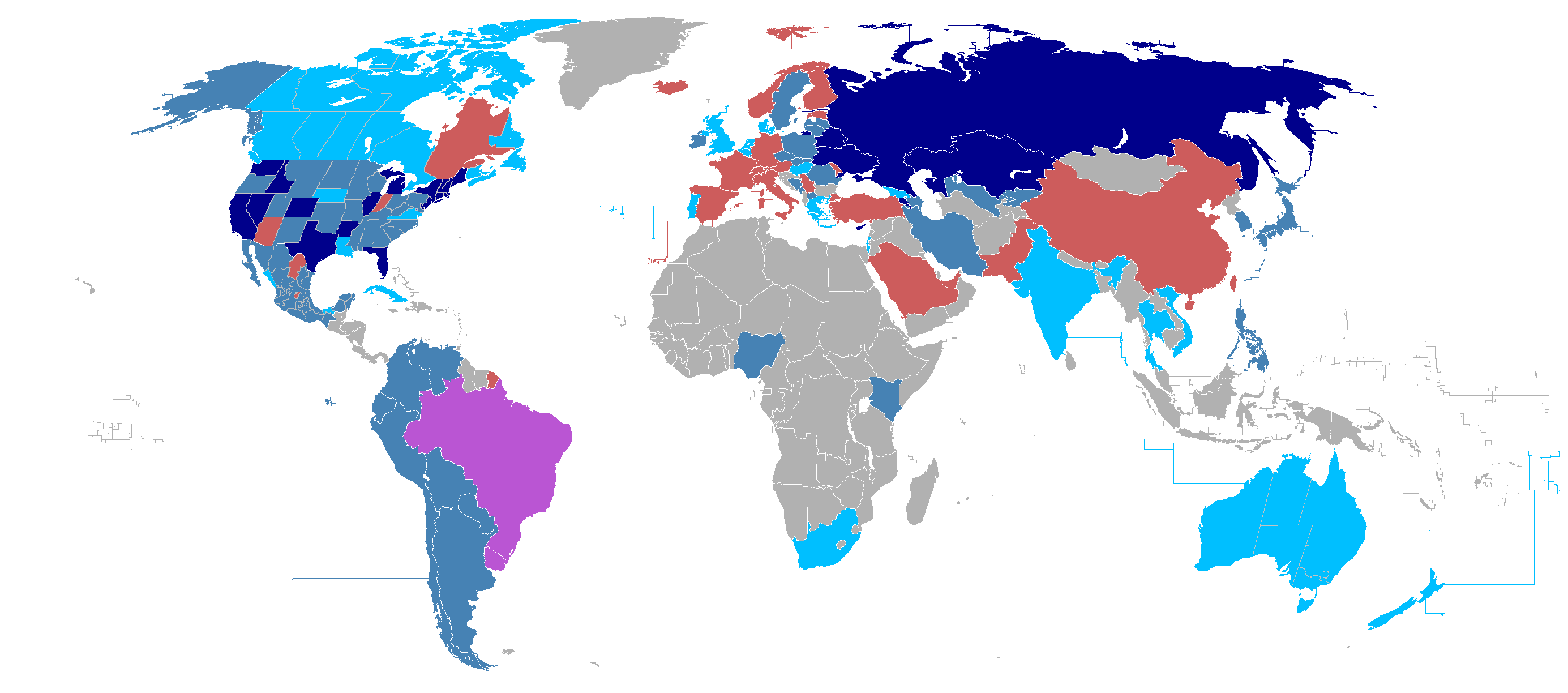
Legal regulation of surrogacy in the world: Both commercial and altruistic forms are legal. No legal regulation Only altruistic forms are legal. Allowed between relatives up to second degree of consanguinity Banned Uncertain

The vast majority of the world's countries do not have legal frameworks regulating surrogacy. For countries with legal frameworks, some ban commercial (i.e. for profit) surrogacy and regulate the legal contract in altruistic (e.g. reimbursement of expenses) surrogacy. Other countries legalize, or ban, both forms.

Often, there are age requirements and medical evaluations for the surrogate to be eligible for surrogacy. Some countries have different legal statuses between gestational, where the surrogate is not an intended parent, and traditional, where the biological mother carries the child. Most jurisdictions in the world give full legal rights for the surrogate to keep the child after birth, with notable exceptions being Georgia, Greece, Kyrgyzstan, and Ukraine. Fertile partners, LGBT partners, recently married partners, unmarried partners, or single people may be ineligible to use surrogacy services, despite being legal in their country otherwise. Artificial methods of conception may be excluded or restricted as well.

Of the countries which allow surrogacy, many have residency or citizenship requirements for the intended parent(s) and/or the surrogate. Countries without such requirements often attract persons from abroad, being destinations for fertility tourism. Some countries, like Italy, have banned their citizens from traveling abroad for surrogacy, with punishment of fines, jail time, and/or denying the child from obtaining legal citizenship in the parents' country of origin.

Notable countries that have legally banned surrogacy in both forms include: China, Finland, France, Germany, Iceland, Italy, Malaysia, Saudi Arabia, Serbia, Slovakia, Spain, Switzerland, and Türkiye.

Notable countries with legal frameworks for altruistic surrogacy include: Canada, Cuba, Greece, India, Israel, Portugal, South Africa, the United Kingdom, and Vietnam.

Notable countries that have all (including commercial) forms of surrogacy legal include: Georgia, Iran, Kyrgyzstan, Russia, Thailand, and Ukraine.

Within Australia, Canada, Mexico, and the United States, there are varying views of surrogacy between the states/provinces/territories.

== International Prohibitions on Commercial Surrogacy ==
Commercial surrogacy, that is, surrogacy where the individual is paid to carry the baby or surrender it to other person(s) is illegal in the European Union, as Article 3 of the Charter of Fundamental Rights of the European Union states that "In the fields of medicine and biology, the following must be respected in particular: [..] (c) the prohibition on making the human body and its parts as such a source of financial gain"

The Oviedo Convention, ratified by 30 countries, also states at Article 21 "Prohibition of financial gain" that: "The human body and its parts shall not, as such, give rise to financial gain."

== Australia ==
In Australia, all jurisdictions allow altruistic surrogacy; with commercial surrogacy being a criminal offense. In New South Wales, Queensland and the Australian Capital Territory it is an offence to enter into international commercial surrogacy arrangements with potential penalties extending to imprisonment for up to one year in Australian Capital Territory, up to two years imprisonment in New South Wales and up to three years imprisonment in Queensland.

In 2004, the Australian Capital Territory made only altruistic surrogacy legal.

In 2006, Australian senator Stephen Conroy and his wife Paula Benson announced that they had arranged for a child to be born through egg donation and gestational surrogacy. Unusually, Conroy was put on the birth certificate as the father of the child. Previously, couples who used to make surrogacy arrangements in Australia had to adopt the child after it was registered as born to the natural mother; rather than being recognized as birth parents, however now that surrogacy is more regular practice for childless parents; most states have switched to such arrangements to give the intended parents proper rights. After the announcement, Victoria passed the Assisted Reproductive Treatment Act 2008, effective since 1 January 2010 to make only altruistic surrogacy legal.

In 2009, Western Australia passed a law to allow only altruistic surrogacy for couples of the opposite-sex only, and to prohibit it for single people and same-sex couples. In 2010, Queensland made only altruistic surrogacy legal, as did New South Wales, and Tasmania did the same in 2013 with the Surrogacy Act No 34 and the Surrogacy (Consequential Amendments) Act No 31

In 2017, South Australia passed a bill to allow gay couples equal access to both surrogacy and IVF. The bill received royal assent on 15 March 2017 and went into effect on 21 March 2017.

In 2022, The Northern Territory passed legislation permitting altruistic surrogacy.

A Medicare rebate is not available for IVF treatment for surrogacy.

== Belgium ==
In Belgium, surrogacy is not legally regulated, but it is often practiced, including by foreigners. Only altruistic surrogacy is allowed in the country. The future parents pay the surrogate mother only the expenses related to the pregnancy. For example, compensation for food, clothing, medical procedures, and transportation. Usually, parents find a surrogate mother through private contacts or through forums on the Internet.

Since Belgium does not have any specific law regulating the process of surrogacy, in fact, a private agreement between a surrogate mother and future parents has no legal force, and there are no clear requirements for the surrogate mother's health (for example, there is no obligation to undergo medical and mental examinations before entering into the surrogacy process, no age requirements). And more, according to Belgian law, the legal mother of a child at birth is the person who gave birth to the child, even if there is no genetic relationship with the child. The transfer of parental rights to biological parents takes place in court, through adoption.

The surrogate mother must voluntarily transfer parental rights to the child to the biological parents. If the surrogate mother who gave birth to the child does not want to hand over the child to the biological parents for any reason, the law will be on the side of the surrogate mother. There is no guarantee that the court will order the child's forced transfer to the biological parents. In such conditions, the surrogacy process can be complicated and unpredictable.

== Brazil ==
Commercial surrogacy is banned by Brazilian law, but altruistic surrogacy is allowed. Nevertheless, the practice is performed illegally throughout the country.

== Canada ==
The Assisted Human Reproduction Act (AHRC) permits only altruistic surrogacy: gestational carriers may be reimbursed for approved expenses but payment of any other consideration or fee is illegal.

== People's Republic of China ==
Surrogacy is forbidden by Regulation of human assisted reproductive technology law in the People's Republic of China. The Ministry of Health has established "departmental rules" which prohibit medical professionals from performing surrogacy procedures, with violations punished by fines (but not criminal liabilities). In practice, surrogacy arrangements are common in mainland China with an underground market for commercial surrogacy estimated to encompass between 400 and 500 agencies in 2012. Underground surrogacy has grown in the 21st century and has led to significant complications.

== Colombia ==
There are no clear rules in Colombia as of today regarding surrogacy and a loophole persists. The current laws applied are those from a natural childbirth. This means the child must be registered with the surnames of the gestational carrier and her partner or spouse, if she has any. Only through a challenging paternity lawsuit before a judge may the commissioning parents be recognized as legal parents, and it may include genetic tests.

In July 2016, a right wing political party, Democratic Center, has introduced for the second time a bill in order to determine the concept of surrogacy and to forbid any types of it.

== Cuba ==
Only altruistic surrogacy is allowed after referendum over a new family law passed and is available since September 2022.

== Czech Republic ==
Surrogacy is not legally regulated in the Czech Republic and so is generally considered legal. The only mention of the phrase "surrogate motherhood" can be found in § 804 of the law n. 89/2012, where the law designates an exception to the ban of adoption by siblings for siblings carried by a surrogate mother.

== Finland ==
All surrogacy arrangements (both commercial and altruistic) have been illegal since 2007. Commercial surrogacy arrangements were illegal even before 2007.

== France ==
In France, since 1994, the article 16-7 of the Code Civil stipulates that any arrangement, commercial or altruistic, relating to procreation or surrogacy is void (without legal effect). It is not sanctioned by the law for the woman who give birth or the sponsoring parents, but legally sanctioned to act as an intermediary to arrange a surrogacy or any tentatives. The French Court of Cassation already took this point of view in 1991. In its judgement the court held that such an agreement is illegal on the basis of articles 6, 353 and 1128 of the Code Civil.

== Germany ==
All surrogacy arrangements (both commercial and altruistic) are illegal. The German Free Democratic Party wants to allow altruistic surrogacy. According to the German Civil Code, the legal mother is always the woman who gave birth to the child.

== Georgia ==
Surrogacy is legally permitted in Georgia, making it one of the few countries in the region where intended parents can engage in both altruistic and commercial surrogacy agreements. The legislation, established in the early 1990s, explicitly allows surrogacy for both domestic and international intended parents.

Since 2022, Georgia has absorbed some of the clients from Ukraine, which was the major surrogacy hub in Europe prior to the Russian invasion. Many Ukrainian clinics reopened in Georgia, while surrogates moved there to avoid conflict and due to the favorable legislation and costs.

In 2023, the Georgian government announced some plans to reconsider its stance regarding commercial surrogacy for foreign citizens, however no further action was taken, and all forms of surrogacy remain fully legal, including programs involving egg donor programs, shipped embryos and self-cycles.

Under Georgian law, surrogacy is available to couples that are married or in the domestic relationship for at least one year. Additionally, a surrogate cannot be an egg donor at the same time; however, donor materials can still be used in the surrogacy programs.

The legislation stipulates that surrogates have no parental rights over the child born through surrogacy. Once the child is born, the intended parents are automatically recognized as the legal parents, and the surrogate has no claims to parental rights or responsibilities.

== Greece ==
Law 3305–2005 ("Enforcement of Medically Assisted Reproduction") Surrogacy in Greece is fully legal and is only one of a handful of countries in the world to give legal protection to intended parents. Intended parents must meet certain qualifications, and will go before a family judge before starting their journey. As long as they meet the qualifications, the court appearance is procedural and will be granted their application. At present, intended parents must be in a heterosexual partnership or be a single female. Females must be able to prove there is a medical indication they cannot carry and be no older than 50 at the time of the contract. As in all jurisdictions, surrogates must pass medical and psychological tests so they can prove to the court that they are medically and mentally fit. What is unique about Greece is that it is the only country in Europe, and one of only countries in the world where the surrogate then has no rights over the child. The intended parents become the legal parents from conception and there is no mention of the surrogate mother anywhere on hospital or birth documents. The intended parent(s) are listed as the parents. This even applies if an egg or sperm donor is used by one of the partners. An added advantage for Europeans is that, due to the Schengen Treaty, they can freely travel home as soon as the baby is born and deal with citizenship issues at that time, as opposed to applying at their own embassy in Greece. The old regime (pursuant to art. 8 of Law 3089/2002), one of the prerequisites for granting the judicial permission for surrogacy was also the fact that the surrogate mother and the commissioning parents should be Greek citizens or permanent residents. However, the law has recently (in July 2014) changed and the new provisions of L. 4272/2014 foresee now that the surrogacy is allowed to applicants or surrogate mothers who have their permanent or temporary residence in Greece. With this new law Greece becomes the only EU country with a comprehensive framework to regulate, facilitate and enforce surrogacy, as according to the explanatory statement of the art. 17 of the L. 4272/2014: "The possibility is now extending also to applicants or surrogate mothers who have their permanent residence outside Greece".

== Hong Kong (S.A.R.) ==
Commercial surrogacy is criminal under the Human Reproductive Technology Ordinance 2000. The law is phrased in a manner that no one can pay a surrogate, no surrogate can receive money, and no one can arrange a commercial surrogacy (the same applies to the supply of gametes), no matter within or outside Hong Kong. Normally only the gametes of the intended parents can be used.

In October 2010, Peter Lee, the eldest son and one of the presumed heirs of billionaire Lee Shau Kee obtained three sons through a gestational carrier, reportedly from California. Since the junior Lee is single, the news attracted criticism on both moral and legal grounds. A vicar general of the territory's Roman Catholic diocese was critical. In December the case was reportedly referred to police after questions were asked in Legco. After a 10-month investigation, Department of Justice had been decided to end the probe as there was not enough evidence to show that a criminal offence had been committed in this case.

== Iceland ==
All surrogacy arrangements (both commercial and altruistic) are illegal.

== India ==
As per the Surrogacy (Regulation) Act, 2021, only a couple who has been married for 5 years can opt for surrogacy on medical grounds only. The law defines a couple as a married Indian "man and woman" and also prescribes an age-criteria with the woman being in the age of 23 years to 50 years and the man between 26 years to 55 years. The couple should not have a child of their own. Though the law allows single women to resort to surrogacy, she has to be a widow or a divorcee between the age of 35 and 45 years. Single men are not eligible. Starting 4 November 2015, commercial surrogacy for foreign intended parents is not legal in India. Those commissioned before this date are reviewed on case by case situation; however, no new surrogacies will be started.

Before 2015, foreign commercial surrogacy was legal in India. India was a destination for surrogacy-related fertility tourism because of the relatively low cost. Including the costs of flight tickets, medical procedures, and hotels, it was roughly a third of the price compared with going through the procedure in the UK. In the case of Balaz v. Union of India the Supreme Court of India has given the verdict that the citizenship of the child born through this process will have the citizenship of its gestational carrier. Surrogacy was regulated by the Indian Council of Medical Research guidelines, 2005.

== Ireland ==
There is no law in Ireland governing surrogacy. In 2005 a Government-appointed Commission published a report on Assisted Human Reproduction, which made recommendations on the broader area of assisted human reproduction. In response to Irish nationals engaging in surrogacy contracts in other nations, the Minister for Justice, Equality and Defence published guidelines for surrogacy on 21 February 2012.

A Supreme Court ruling in May 2023 noted the lack of legislation around surrogacy in Ireland.

== Israel ==
In March 1996, the Israeli government legalized gestational surrogacy under the Embryo Carrying Agreements Law. This law made Israel the first country in the world to implement a form of state-controlled surrogacy in which each and every contract must be approved directly by the state. A state-appointed committee permits surrogacy arrangements to be filed only by Israeli citizens who share the same religion. The numerous restrictions on surrogacy under Israeli law have prompted some intended parents to turn to surrogates outside of the country.

In February 2020, the Israeli Supreme Court ruled the restriction on same-sex couples from entering surrogacy agreements as discriminatory, thus giving the state one year to change the law. In July 2021, the Supreme Court made a second ruling stating that legislation banning same-sex couples and single men from becoming parents via surrogacy would be null and void within six months. In January 2022, Health Minister Nitzan Horowitz announced that surrogacy would be allowed for same-sex couples, transgender people, and single men starting on 11 January.

== Iran ==
All surrogacy arrangements (both commercial and altruistic) are legal and popular. Many couples from the Middle East do surrogacy in Iran for legal easiness.

The legalization of surrogacy in Iran is an interplay between religious acceptance, legal interpretation, and societal norms. In a country where religious adherence plays a significant role in governance and daily life, permitting surrogacy was no doubt the same.

Iran's religious demographic is predominantly Shia Islam, with around 90–95% of its citizens practicing this sect of Islam. Initially, both Shia and Sunni religious scholars and authorities were aligned in the prohibition of third-party reproduction, including surrogacy. This was a stance rooted in traditional interpretations of Islamic law and ethics. However, the landscape began to shift in 1999 when Ayatollah Ali Hussein Al Khamene’j, the supreme leader of the Islamic Republic of Iran issued a fatwa addressing surrogacy.

The fatwa was a turning point, providing detailed guidance on the permissibility of assisted reproduction techniques, including surrogacy, within the framework of Shia Islam. By issuing this fatwa, Ayatollah Khamene’j provided a sense of legitimacy and security for families considering or participating in surrogacy agreements. The weight of his authority as the supreme leader lent considerable credibility to the practice, reassuring both individuals and the broader society.

Central to the acceptance of surrogacy in Iran was the principle of ijtihad, which emphasizes individual religious reasoning and interpretation. While, not codified as law, ijtihad holds significant sway in Shia Islam and allows a degree of flexibility and adaption to modern circumstances. In the case of surrogacy, Iranian citizens were able to exercise their right to ijtihad, engaging in personal religious reasoning that aligned with their beliefs and values.

== Italy ==
According to the Law Decree no. 40 approved on 19 February 2004 by the Italian Parliament, titled "Regulations concerning medically assisted procreation", any form of selling of either gametes or embryos, as well as surrogacy, is prohibited and punished with jail time lasting between three months and two years and with a fine ranging between 600,000 and one million euros (article 12, subsection 6). This prohibition has been further underpinned by a sentence of the Italian Constitutional Court (i.e. sentence no. 272 of 2017), that stated that "the practice of surrogacy constitutes an unbearable attack on women's dignity and deeply undermines human relations".

Its legitimacy was confirmed by the Italian Constitutional Court in 2019. In the same year, the partner of the biological father of a surrogated child asked for a birth certificate which had been registered outside of Italy to be legally recognised, but the joint session of the Civil Sections of the Italian Supreme Court of Cassation rejected his legal pursuit.

In 2023, Prime Minister Giorgia Meloni ordered municipalities to follow a December 2021 court decision to stop certifying foreign birth certificates of children born to Italian same-sex couples through use of a surrogate in another country.

On 16 October 2024, the Italian Parliament passed a law pursuant to which Italian citizens can be prosecuted if they have children through surrogacy abroad, making surrogacy abroad a 'Universal crime' like human trafficking, pedophilia, war crimes, genocide or crimes against humanity.

== Japan ==
In March 2008, the Science Council of Japan proposed a ban on surrogacy and said that doctors, agents and their clients should be punished for commercial surrogacy arrangements. Other than that, it remains unregulated.

== Kenya ==
There is no legal regulations/laws of surrogacy in Kenya.

== Kyrgyzstan ==
In Kyrgyzstan, surrogacy is officially regulated by Article 57 of the Law "On the Protection of Citizens' Health in the Kyrgyz Republic" dated January 12, 2024, No. 14. This law establishes the primary conditions for legally conducted surrogacy. According to it, regardless of medical indications or marital status, every individual has the right to become a parent using the surrogacy method. There are no strict restrictions for prospective parents, making participation in the program maximally accessible for all aspiring to parenthood.

== Mexico ==
Surrogacy in Mexico is unregulated in most states and Mexico City as they lack specific legal framework for surrogacy. There are two states that have civil codes that regulate surrogacy: the states of Sinaloa and Tabasco. The state of Sinaloa introduced a civil code pertaining to surrogacy in 2013, and it restricted surrogacy to married couples with proven infertility. The state of Tabasco introduced surrogacy in its civil code in 1997, and it amended its civil code to exclude international intended parents, LGBT individuals, and singles from accessing surrogacy.

In 2021, the Supreme Court of Justice of the Nation found that the part of civil code of the state of Tabasco that restricted surrogacy to married Mexican couples violated Article 4 of the Constitution of Mexico and therefore is unconstitutional. The court ruled that surrogacy should be accessible to every individual regardless of sexuality, nationality, or marital status for the purpose of building a family, and that the intended parents who commissioned surrogacy should be deemed the legal parents of the child as procreational will should be the basis of determining the legal parentage, not gestational relationship.

In regions of Mexico where surrogacy is unregulated, Amparo trials regularly take place when intended parents petition the federal court to order the local civil registry to register their baby born through surrogacy with a birth certificate showing only the name(s) of the intended parent(s), and in the majority of cases, a favorable ruling (Amparo) is issued.

== Malaysia ==
Surrogacy is currently prohibited by fatwa issued by National Council of Islamic Religious Affairs in 2008.

== The Netherlands ==
Altruistic surrogacy is legal in the Netherlands. Commercial surrogacy is illegal in the Netherlands. Although altruistic surrogacy is legal, there is only one hospital taking in couples and there are extremely strict rules to get in. This makes a lot of couples seek their treatment outside the Netherlands.

== New Zealand ==
Altruistic surrogacy is legal.

== Nigeria ==
Surrogacy is unregulated in Nigeria, and surrogacy contracts may be enforceable in Nigerian courts on the basis of simple contracts. Gestational surrogacy is currently practiced in Nigeria by a few IVF clinics. The guidelines are as approved by the practice guidelines of the Association of Fertility and Reproductive Health (AFRH) of Nigeria. The ART regulation that is currently being considered by the Senate permits surrogacy and allows some inducement to be paid for transport and other expenses.

== Philippines ==
There is no legal framework for surrogacy in the Philippines. Philippine laws on parenthood renders legal barriers on transferring the rights to the intended parents.

The Philippine Society of Reproductive Medicine prohibits assisting in the practice of in vitro fertilization and surrogacy through donor sperm and egg cells among its members.

== Poland ==
Surrogacy is mostly unregulated in Poland. A 2015 news report estimated there are likely dozens of surrogate mothers in Poland. According to the Family Code, the legal mother of a child is always the woman who gave birth to them.

== Portugal ==
Heterosexual and lesbian couples could become parents via surrogacy in Portugal since 2016, under certain conditions. Yet, some parts of this law were considered unconstitutional in 2018 and it has since been suspended. Traditional surrogacy is illegal in Portugal except for some specific situations that give the right for a surrogate mother to be genetic (for example, if the future adoptive mother is completely barren).

=== Before the first legal surrogacy law ===
In 2006, a law was approved that explicitly considered any surrogacy contract to be null and void (Law 32/2006, article 8).

A limited gestational surrogacy law proposed by the Left Bloc was approved in Parliament on the 13 May 2016, which went through considerable modifications during the five months that it took to get it from project to law (it was discussed in a work group with representatives from all parliamentary groups). The law received the favorable votes of the Socialist Party (minus two), Left Bloc (BE), The Greens (PEV), People Animals Nature (PAN), and 24 out of 89 members of the Social Democratic Party (PSD, including the former party leader Pedro Passos Coelho). Both CDS - People's Party (CDS) and the Communist Party (PCP) voted against the proposal. The communists justified their vote as being in line with the recommendations of the National Ethics Council. President Marcelo Rebelo de Sousa vetoed the law as soon as he received it, giving the same justification as the Communist Party. The law was once again sent to the Parliament and passed a second time after some changes, on 20 July 2016, with the favorable votes of BE, PS, PEV, PAN and 20 members of PSD. Eight members of PSD abstained, including Pedro Passos Coelho. The remaining members of PSD voted against, as did all members of CDS and PCP.

=== Limited gestational surrogacy legalization ===
On 22 August 2016, gestational surrogacy was legalized in Portugal (Law 25/2016) for the cases in which there is an absence of the uterus or, due to lesions or disease, the uterus is unable to successfully carry a pregnancy to term. The article 8 of the 2006 law was revoked. In such cases, the surrogate mother must willingly enter the contract and accept to renounce any motherhood rights and duties. The gestational surrogacy requires a written contract that explicitly deals with the possibility of abortion in certain cases, the Ordem dos Médicos' opinion (which does not need to be positive) and the National Council of Medically Assisted Reproduction's (CNPMA) permission. The only payment/donation that the genetic parents can make in favor of the surrogate mother is her medical expenses and the surrogate mother cannot be economically dependent on the genetic parents. No behavioral restrictions can be imposed on the surrogate mother.

Single men and homosexual male couples cannot have access to gestational surrogacy. The law does not explicitly exclude single women, but requires that only one of the members of the couple has to contribute with genetic material, which may be interpreted as restricting the procedure to couples.

The law does not restrict gestational surrogacy to residents, meaning that Portugal may become a fertility tourism destination.

=== After the first legal surrogacy law ===
Adoption of the law caused some debate within several Portuguese Christian Churches, though not among the once-dominant Roman Catholic Church. Representatives of Brazilian and US-based evangelical and Pentecostal churches condemn surrogacy and suggest that infertile couples can/must (depending on the Church) pursue conventional adoption (national or transnational even though the later is banned by law).

After the 2016 law was approved, a regulatory decree (6/2017) was created on 31 July 2017 to materialize the 2016 law that included, for example, the requirement that the surrogacy mother is accompanied by a psychologist during and after the birth.

In February 2017, a petition with more than 4000 signatures (the legal requirement for the Parliament to be forced to discuss the matter of the petition), was submitted to Parliament, asking for a referendum on gestational surrogacy. At the same time, a group of members of CDS and PSD requested that the law was subject to a constitutional inspection. In April 2018, the Constitutional Court deliberated on the matter and declared that some of the law's articles were in fact unconstitutional. The effects of the decision did not apply to any processes that had initiated the therapeutic procedure. This meant that a single process was allowed, while a total of eight processes that were in different stages of progress were considered null and void.

In July 2019, new changes were made to the 2016 law in Parliament in an attempt to revert the Constitutional Court's decisions, but one of the issues raised by the Court (regarding the right of the surrogate mother to choose to keep the baby) failed to make it to the final version of the law. The final version had the positive votes of PS, BE (the author of the proposal), PEV, PAN and 21 PSD members, as well as five abstentions from PSD members. PCP, CDS, and 63 PSD members voted against it. In August 2019, president Marcelo Rebelo de Sousa sent the law to the Constitutional Court for review. In September 2019, the 2016 law, after the 2019 changes, was once again considered unconstitutional by the Constitutional Court.

== Russia ==
Gestational surrogacy, even commercial, is legal in Russia, being available to practically all adults willing to be parents. There must be one of several medical indications for surrogacy: absence of uterus, deformity of the uterine cavity or cervix, uterine cavity synechia, somatic diseases contraindicating child bearing, or repeated failure of IVF despite high-quality embryos.

The first surrogacy program in Russia was successfully implemented in 1995 at the IVF centre of the Obstetrics and Gynecology Institute in St. Petersburg. Public opinion in general is surrogacy-friendly; recent cases of a famous singer and a well-known businesswoman who openly used services of gestational surrogates received positive news coverage. Meanwhile, the Russian Orthodox Church has officially condemned surrogacy. As regards the baptism of the children born through surrogacy, the Russian Orthodox Church holds that a "child born with the assistance of "surrogate motherhood" can be Baptized according to the wishes of the party that will be raising it, if such are either its "biological parents" or its "surrogate mother," only after they have recognized that, from the Christian point of view, such reproductive technology is morally reprehensible and have borne ecclesial repentance – regardless of whither they ignored the Church's position consciously or unconsciously".

Registration of children born through surrogacy is regulated by the Family Code of Russia (art. 51–52) and the Law on Acts on Civil Status (art. 16). A surrogate's consent is needed for that. Apart from that consent, no adoption nor court decision is required. The surrogate's name is never listed on the birth certificate. There is no requirement for the child to be genetically related to at least one of the commissioning parents.

Children born to heterosexual couples who are not officially married or single intended parents through gestational surrogacy are registered in accordance to analogy of jus (art. 5 of the Family Code). A court decision may be needed in that case. On 5 August 2009 a St. Petersburg court definitely resolved a dispute as to whether single women could apply for surrogacy and obliged the State Registration Authority to register a 35-year-old single intended mother, Nataliya Gorskaya, as the mother of her surrogate son.

On 4 August 2010 a Moscow court ruled that a single man who applied for gestational surrogacy (using donor eggs) could be registered as the only parent of his son, becoming the first man in Russia to defend his right to become a father through court proceedings. The surrogate mother's name was not listed on the birth certificate; the father was listed as the only parent. After that, a few more identical decisions concerning single men who became fathers through surrogacy were issued by different courts in Russia, listing men as the only parents of their surrogate children and confirming that prospective single parents, regardless of their sex or sexual orientation, can exercise their right to parenthood through surrogacy in Russia.

Liberal legislation makes Russia attractive for "reproductive tourists" looking for techniques not available in their countries. Intended parents go there for oocyte donation because of advanced age or marital status (single women and single men) and when surrogacy is considered. Foreigners have the same rights for assisted reproduction as Russian citizens. Within 3 days after the birth, the commissioning parents obtain a Russian birth certificate with both their names on it. Genetic relation to the child (in case of donation) does not matter.

== Saudi Arabia ==
Religious authorities in Saudi Arabia do not allow the use of gestational carriers, instead suggesting medical procedures to restore fertility and ability to deliver.

== Serbia ==
All surrogacy arrangements (both commercial and altruistic) are illegal. A draft of the new civil law is said to allow gestational carriers, but Serbian Assembly still did not adopt this law yet. On 21 April 2017, the Serbian Assembly started a discussion a legislation on assisted reproductive technology that bans all forms of surrogacy. (The legislation is being discussed.)

== Slovakia ==
Since 2025, all surrogacy arrangements (both commercial and altruistic) are illegal in Slovakia. Amendment to the Slovak Constitution states that: "Agreement to bear a child for another is prohibited". In this case, it is prohibited to conclude agreements under which a woman undertakes to carry and give birth to a child with the intention of handing it over to another person.

== South Africa ==
The South Africa Children's Act of 2005 (which came fully into force in 2010) enabled the "commissioning parents" and the surrogate to have their surrogacy agreement validated by the High Court even before fertilization. This allows the commissioning parents to be recognized as legal parents from the outset of the process and helps prevent uncertainty – although if the surrogate mother is the genetic mother she has until 60 days after the birth of the child to change her mind. The law permits single people and gay couples to be commissioning parents. However, only those domiciled in South Africa benefit from the protection of the law, no non-validated agreements will be enforced, and agreements must be altruistic rather than commercial. If there is only one commissioning parent, s/he must be genetically related to the child. If there are two, they must both be genetically related to the child unless that is physically impossible due to infertility or sex (as in the case of a same-sex couple). The Commissioning parent or parents must be physically unable to birth a child independently. The surrogate mother must have had at least one pregnancy and viable delivery and have at least one living child. The surrogate mother has the right to unilaterally terminate the pregnancy, but she must consult with and inform the commissioning parents, and if she is terminating for a non-medical reason, may be obliged to refund any medical reimbursements she had received.

== South Korea ==
As of mid-2010s, surrogacy was available and mostly unregulated in South Korea. The practice is often morally stigmatized. Surrogacy has declined since mid-2000s, as some aspects of commercial surrogacy became illegal.

== Spain ==
Whereas surrogacy is not legal in Spain (the biological mother's renouncement contract is not legally valid), it is legal to perform the surrogacy in a country where it is legal, having the mother the nationality from that same country.

== Sweden ==
Surrogacy is illegal in Swedish healthcare, but there are no legal regulations/laws of surrogacy for it and it remains unregulated.

== Switzerland ==
Surrogacy is regulated in the "Bundesgesetz über die medizinisch unterstützte Fortpflanzung (Fortpflanzungsmedizingesetz, FMedG) vom 18. Dezember 1998" and illegal in Switzerland. Art. 4 forbids surrogacy, Art. 31 regulates the punishment of clinicians who apply in vitro fertilisation for surrogacy or persons who arrange surrogacy. The surrogate mother is not punished by law. She will be the legal mother of the child.

On 24 August 2014, the Administrative Court of the Canton of St. Gallen granted parentship to two men of a child born in the USA.

== Thailand ==
In response to the controversial Baby Gammy incident in 2014, Thailand since 30 July 2015, has banned foreign people travelling to Thailand, to have commercial surrogacy contract arrangement, under the Protection of Children Born from Assisted Reproductive Technologies Act. Only opposite-sex married couples as Thailand residents are allowed to have a commercial surrogacy contract arrangement. In the past Thailand was a popular destination for couples seeking surrogate mothers.

== Turkey ==
Turkish law effectively bans every version of surrogacy. Turkish Civil Code, Article 282, defines legal motherhood as between a mother and child by birth and the inability to release that relationship by any means, including private contracts. Contracts that do attempt to release this relationship are void under the Turkish Code of Obligations, Article 27. Couples of Turkey also cannot use artificial reproductive technologies with "third-party gametes", including a surrogate's or donor's, under a 2014 bill that amends the Fundamental Law on Health Services. Punishments for Turkish citizens "altering or concealing a child's descent" can range from 1–3 years of jail time (Turkish Penal Code, Article 231), and criminalises false declarations made to officials for documentation (Turkish Penal Code, Article 206). Turkish citizens can go to other jurisdictions where surrogacy is legal, but is dependent on recognition of foreign documentation by courts, which vary by locality and year.

== Ukraine ==
Ukraine is a major international surrogacy destination, given its very liberal laws, as well as the fact that prices are more affordable than in the United States.

Since 2002, surrogacy and surrogacy in combination with egg/sperm donation has been absolutely legal in Ukraine. According to the law a donor or a surrogate mother has no parental rights over the child born and the child born is legally the child of the prospective parents. This is possible because in Ukraine a woman can give birth to a child without being considered the child's mother. In other countries a woman automatically becomes the mother of a child by giving birth, even if the surrogate mother is not genetically related to the child she carried.

In Ukraine the start of the introduction of methods of supporting reproductive medicine was given in the eighties of the preceding century. It was Kharkiv where the extracorporeal fertilization method was for the first time successfully applied in Ukraine, and in 1991 a girl named Katy was born. Kharkiv was also the first city in the former Soviet Union to realize surrogacy. Many clinics dealing with surrogacy have been opened in Kyiv and Kharkiv.

Ukrainian surrogacy laws are very favorable and fully support the individual's reproductive rights. Surrogacy is officially regulated by Clause 123 of the Family Code of Ukraine and the order of the Ministry of health of Ukraine "On approval of the application of assisted reproductive technologies in Ukraine" from 09.09.2013 No. 787. You can choose between Gestational Surrogacy, Egg/sperm Donation, special Embryo adoption programs and their combinations. No specific permission from any regulatory body is required for that. A written informed consent of all parties (intended parents and surrogate) participating in the surrogacy program is mandatory. The intended mother has to demonstrate that there is, in fact, a medical reason that makes impossible for her to get pregnant, either because there is a risk for her or for the baby.

However, Ukraine does not support surrogacy for family models different from the heterosexual one, leaving apart single parent families, lesbian couples, etc.

Ukrainian legislation allows intended parents to carry on a surrogacy program and their names will be on the birth certificate of the child born as a result of the surrogacy program from the very beginning. The child is considered to be legally "belonging" to the prospective parents from the very moment of conception. The surrogate's name is never listed on the birth certificate. The surrogate cannot keep the child after the birth. Even if a donation program took place and there is no biological relation between the child and the intended mother, their names will be on the birth certificate (Clause 3 of article 123 of the Family Code of Ukraine).

Embryo research is also allowed, gamete and embryo donation permitted on a commercial level. Single women can be treated by known or anonymous donor insemination. Gestational surrogacy is an option for officially married couples only (a man and a woman) if they are able to prove they cannot carry a baby themselves for medical reasons and at least one parent must have a genetic link to the newborn baby. Surrogacy in Ukraine is not regulated in law as commercial, it is more close to altruistic, as the so-called "payment" is not performed to the surrogate mother, it is called a compensation and is not under obligation to pay taxes.

The ongoing war and Russian invasion of Ukraine has not stopped the surrogacy industry. From the beginning of the invasion in February 2022 to July 2023 more than 1,000 children have been born in Ukraine to surrogate mothers. Six hundred children were born at the BiotexCom clinic in Kyiv, one of Europe's largest surrogacy clinics. Foreigners still traveled to Ukraine to collect the babies they had paid for despite the constant threat of Russian bombardments. In March 2022 Ukrainian MPs proposed prohibiting foreigners from using the services of Ukrainian surrogate mothers during martial law, but this proposal was voted down two months later.

In July 2023 the BiotexCom clinic charged €40,000 for its services. The clinic stated that more than half of that sum goes to the surrogate mothers. In March 2022 Deutsche Welle reported that all-inclusive packages did cost between €30,000 ($33,000) and €40,000; and that the Ukrainian woman earned about €15,000 to €20,000 for her taking part in the surrogacy program — (that was) several times more than the average annual salary.

== United Kingdom ==
Altruistic surrogacy is legal in the United Kingdom, however, commercial surrogacy arrangements are not: as they are prohibited by section 2 of the Surrogacy Arrangements Act 1985. Whilst it is illegal in the UK to pay more than reasonable expenses for a surrogacy, the relationship is recognised under section 30 of the Human Fertilisation and Embryology Act 1990. However, in the case of parental orders applied for as a result of international surrogacy arrangements, the court has retroactively authorised payment for commercial arrangements when it is in the child's best interest, see Re L (A Minor) [2010] E.W.H.C. 3146 (Fam), J v G [2013] E.W.H.C. 1432 (Fam), Re X and Y (Parental Order: Retrospective Authorisation of Payments) [2012] E.W.H.C. 3147 (Fam) and Re C (Parental Order) [2013] E.W.H.C. 2413 (Fam). "It will only be in the clearest case of the abuse of public policy that the court will be able to withhold an order if otherwise welfare considerations support its making." Regardless of contractual or financial consideration for expenses, surrogacy arrangements are not legally enforceable under section 1A of the Surrogacy Arrangements Act; therefore, a surrogate mother maintains the legal right of determination for the child, even if they are genetically unrelated. Unless a parental order or adoption order is made, the surrogate mother remains the legal mother of the child. This is because under section 33 of the Human Fertilisation and Embryology Act 2008 (HFEA 2008) 'mother' is the women who has, or is carrying the child. Additionally, if the surrogate is married, under section 42 HFEA 2008 their partner becomes the other legal parent, unless it can be shown they did not consent to the surrogate's insemination.

=== Parental Orders ===
Legal Parenthood through a parental order can be obtained under section 54 HFEA 2008, for two applicants, and section 54A HFEA 2008, for single applicants. In order to meet the criteria under section 54 HFEA 2008, an application must be made by two people in an enduring family relationship, and one of their gametes were used in the insemination, subject to section 54(1) and section 54(2). In X (A Child: Foreign Surrogacy) [2018] E.W.F.C. 15 the couple openly acknowledged they were in a "sham marriage" however, this was unproblematic under section 54: as the court still considered them to be in a lasting relationship. Under section 54(3) the application must be made no later than 6 months after the child's birth. Under section 54(4)(a) and 54(4)(b) at the time of the application the child must be living with the applicants, at least one of which is domiciled in the UK. Both applicants when applying must be over the age of 18, as required by section 54(5). The surrogate and any other individual with parental rights must give their full and informed consent to the parental order, as required under section 54(6)(a) and 54(6)(b) unless, under section 54(7) they lack the capacity to consent. Moreover, under section 54(8) the court must be satisfied the no payment has been given, other than reasonable expenses, unless authorised by the court. Under section 54A HFEA 2008, the requirements are the same as under 54, except 54A(1) allows for one applicant, provided the child was not carried by them and their gametes were used in the insemination.

=== Best Interest of the Child ===
In the first UK surrogacy case Re C (A Minor) (Wardship: Surrogacy) (Baby Cotton Case) [1985] F.L.R. 846. Latey J stated, "morals and ethics are irrelevant, what matters is what is in the child's best interest." When considering if a parental order should be granted the primary consideration of the court is child welfare, pursuant to the Human Fertilisation and Embryology (Parental Orders) (Consequential, Transitional and Savings Provision) Order 2010, which imports the provisions of section 1 of the Adoption and Children Act 2002 into section 54 of the HFEA 2008. The primacy of child welfare has resulted in a more flexible application of section 54(3), to accommodate the child's best interest. In Re Re X (A Child) (Surrogacy: Time Limit) [2014] E.W.H.C. 3135 (Fam) Munby P states, excluding parental orders made even a day late is "...the very antithesis of sensible; it is almost nonsensical." Munby P states this is because of the large impact on, not just the applicants, but "...the innocent child, whose welfare is the courts paramount concern." This flexible approach was followed in KB & RJ v RT (Rev 1) [2016] E.W.H.C. 760 (Fam) where a parental order was granted to a two-year-old child.

== United States ==
Surrogacy and its attendant legal issues fall under state jurisdiction and the legal situation for surrogacy varies greatly from state to state. Some states have written legislation, while others have developed common law regimes for dealing with surrogacy issues. Some states facilitate surrogacy and surrogacy contracts, others simply refuse to enforce them, and some penalize commercial surrogacy. Surrogacy friendly states tend to enforce both commercial and altruistic surrogacy contracts and facilitate straightforward ways for the intended parents to be recognized as the child's legal parents. Some relatively surrogacy friendly states only offer support for married heterosexual couples. Generally, only gestational surrogacy is supported and traditional surrogacy finds little to no legal support.

States generally considered to be surrogacy friendly include California, Illinois, Arkansas, Maryland, Washington, D.C., Oregon, and New Hampshire among others. Both New Jersey and Washington state commercial surrogacy laws became effective from 1 January 2019.

For legal purposes, key factors are where the contract is completed, where the gestational carrier resides, and where the birth takes place. Therefore, individuals living in a non-friendly state can still benefit from the policies of surrogacy friendly states by working with a surrogate who lives and will give birth in a friendly state.

The variations in policy mean that employee surrogacy benefits, which an increasing number of employers offer, can only be enjoyed in certain jurisdictions.

=== Arkansas ===
Arkansas was one of the first states to enact surrogacy-friendly laws. In 1989, under then-Governor Bill Clinton, it passed Act 647, which states that in a surrogacy arrangement, the biological father and his wife will be recognized as the child's legal parents from birth, even if his wife is not genetically related to the child (i.e., in a traditional surrogacy arrangement). If he is unmarried, he alone will be recognized as the legal parent. A woman may also be recognized as the legal mother of the surrogate's genetic child as long as that child was conceived with anonymous donor sperm. On the other hand, it is unclear how or whether same-sex couples could benefit these laws, since the 2008 ballot measure that made it illegal for unmarried, cohabiting individuals to adopt or provide foster care to minors. On 26 June 2015, the 2008 ballot issue is moot because of Obergefell v. Hodges.

=== California ===
California is known to be a surrogacy-friendly state. It permits commercial surrogacy, regularly enforces gestational surrogacy contracts, and makes it possible for all intended parents, regardless of marital status or sexual orientation, to establish their legal parentage prior to the birth and without adoption proceedings (pre-birth orders).

=== Louisiana ===
Louisiana restricts surrogacy to married, heterosexual couples who are using their own gametes. Surrogacy via egg and/or sperm donation is prohibited. No compensation of the surrogate is allowed, prohibiting commercial surrogacy statewide. All parties must have been Louisiana residents for at least six months at the time of entering the surrogacy contract. The surrogacy must be considered medically necessary, and court approval prior to embryo transfer is required.

=== Michigan ===
On 1 April 2024, Michigan legalized compensated and altruistic surrogacy agreements. Previously, Michigan forbade all surrogacy agreements, compensated or not, with it having been a felony to enter into such agreements, punishable by fines of up to $50,000 and up to five years in prison.

=== Nevada ===
Surrogacy in Nevada has been legally recognized since the state adopted provisions based on the Uniform Parentage Act, which Nevada incorporated into its statues in the early 2000s. The current framework is codified under Nevada Revised Statutes Chapter 126 (NRS 126.500-126.810), with significant updates and clarifications implemented around 2013. Since then, Nevada has consistently permitted gestational surrogacy, including compensated arrangements, provided statutory requirements such as written agreements, independent legal counsel, and pre-conception execution are met. Overtime, the law has also been interpreted to allow a broad definition of "intended parent", meaning that both individuals and couples (regardless of marital status and sexual orientation) can establish legal parentage through court orders.

=== New Hampshire ===
Since 2014, New Hampshire is recognized as a surrogacy friendly state, with laws in place to protect all parties to a surrogacy arrangement. All intended parents, irrespective of marital status, sexual orientation, or a genetic connection to the child, are able to establish their legal parental rights through pre-birth orders placing their names directly on the child's initial birth certificate. Reasonable compensation to the surrogate is permitted by statute.

=== New York ===
As of 15 February 2021, New York law allows for compensated gestational surrogacy agreements and provides a simple path to establish legal parental rights for parents who rely on assisted reproductive technology to have children. The law, the Child-Parent Security Act, also created a first-in-the-nation "Surrogate's Bill of Rights" governing all of the surrogacy arrangements under its auspices.

=== Oklahoma ===
On 23 May 2019, Gov. Kevin Stitt signed into law HB2468, which legalizes and recognizes the validity of both compensated and uncompensated gestational surrogacy agreements. Under the bill, a comprehensive court procedure is created to validate all gestational agreements. The bill also allows a court to enter pre-birth orders establishing parentage prior to the birth of the child. The bill applies to gestational agreements entered into by single individuals, as well as heterosexual and homosexual couples, who wish to become parents.

=== Rhode Island ===
Rhode Island permits gestational surrogacy, as cited in the Uniform Parentage Act, which took effect 1 January 2021. This act allows couples, married or unmarried, or individuals, homosexual or heterosexual, to use their own gametes or those of an egg and/or sperm donor to conceive a child via surrogacy. It also allows pre-birth orders, as long as at least one intended parent is a US resident.

=== Wisconsin ===
There is no law prohibiting gestational surrogacy in Wisconsin. In July 2013 the Wisconsin Supreme Court ruled in the case of Rosecky v. Schissel that the surrogacy agreement between the parties was legal and enforceable, striking down an earlier Circuit Court ruling and thus setting a precedent in the state. Chief Justice Shirley Abrahamson and Justice Ann Walsh Bradley filing a strongly worded concurring opinion, stating that "A parenting agreement is a valid enforceable contract," "unless enforcement is contrary to the best interests of the child."

=== Lawsuits ===
Baby M: New Jersey 1988. The surrogate mother in a traditional surrogacy arrangement decided to keep the resulting child. The intended parents sued to have themselves recognized as the legal parents. The New Jersey Supreme Court found that the surrogacy contract was invalid as a matter of New Jersey public policy. However, the intended parents were given custody of the child because the courts thought they would provide a better home for the baby than the surrogate mother, who was instead given visitation rights.

McKenna West surrogacy case: 2026 litigation in Alaska, California, and Texas that arose after surrogate McKenna West declined to have an abortion in the wake of fetal diagnosis of hypoplastic left heart syndrome. The intended parents were ultimately awarded custody of the child via courts in multiple jurisdictions.

== Vietnam ==
Surrogacy for humanitarian purposes has been allowed in Vietnam from 2015 after the amended Family and Marriage Law passed with nearly 60% of votes from the National Assembly.

Under the new law, surrogacy will only be allowed among married couples, who do not have any common child, after doctors confirm the wife can not give birth even with technical support. The surrogate must be a relative of either the husband or wife, and have already given birth successfully. A woman is only allowed to be a surrogate once in her life and must produce her husband's approval if she's married. The embryo must be created by the intended parents' sperm and ovum. The process must be voluntary and follow in-vitro fertilization regulations.
