= Baby M =

American custody case

Baby M (born March 27, 1986) was the pseudonym used in the case In re Baby M, 537 A.2d 1227, 109 N.J. 396 (N.J. 1988) for the infant whose legal parentage was in question.

== Origins ==
In re Baby M was a custody case that became the first American court ruling on the validity of surrogacy. William Stern entered into a surrogacy agreement with Marybeth Whitehead, arranged by the Infertility Center of New York ("ICNY"), opened in 1981 by a Michigan attorney, Noel Keane. According to the agreement, Mary Beth Whitehead would be inseminated with William Stern's sperm (making her a traditional, as opposed to gestational, surrogate), bring the pregnancy to term, and relinquish her parental rights in favor of William's wife, Elizabeth. Mary Beth initially relinquished the child to the Sterns per the contract, but returned the next day, threatening to kill herself if she could not see the infant. The Sterns, not wanting to risk Mary Beth's life, agreed to let her see the baby for an additional day or two. Instead of returning to the Sterns, Mary Beth and her husband Richard kidnapped Baby M for 87 days. The Sterns turned to the courts, who issued an ex parte order for the child to be returned to New Jersey, where the matter would be discussed in court, and temporary custody was awarded to the Sterns.

== Background details ==
In March 1984, Mary Beth Whitehead responded to an ad placed by the Infertility Center of New York in the Asbury Park Press seeking women willing to help infertile couples have children. She was a high school drop-out who had married Richard Whitehead, a truck driver with whom she had two children. At roughly the time of her pregnancy with Baby M, Richard was in an accident. He failed to notice that a trailer carrying a full-sized bulldozer had detached from the large dump truck he was driving, as he passed through South Jersey's largest traffic circle.

Elizabeth Stern was not infertile, but had multiple sclerosis and she and her husband William Stern were worried about the potential health implications of pregnancy, including temporary paralysis. While in vitro fertilization of harvested eggs, followed by implantation of a blastula/embryo, was an available technology, Elizabeth Stern feared the then-totally-unknown genetic risk factors, the choice repeatedly subject of the Court's questions to Stern and his counsel. In court, Bill Stern testified that having a child who was related to him by blood was of particular importance because he is the last survivor of a family wiped out by the Holocaust in Nazi Germany.

The Sterns and Mary Beth Whitehead entered into a surrogacy contract, according to which Whitehead would be artificially inseminated with Stern's sperm, and relinquish her parental rights in favor of the Sterns, in return for $10,000, and possibly expenses.

On March 27, 1986, Whitehead gave birth to a daughter. She managed initially to get a birth certificate, naming the infant Sara Elizabeth Whitehead. Three days after the birth, the infant was handed to the Sterns, who renamed her Melissa Elizabeth Stern. The very next day, Whitehead went back to the Sterns and demanded that the baby be given back to her. She told them that she could not live without her baby, that she must have her, even if only for one week, that thereafter she would surrender her child. The Sterns, concerned that Mrs. Whitehead might indeed kill herself, not wanting under any circumstances to risk that, and in any event believing that Mrs. Whitehead would keep her word, turned the child over to her.

The Whiteheads claimed that Mary Beth was suffering a debilitating post-partum bladder infection at the time, but in fact they kidnapped Baby M and fled from New Jersey for Florida. The Sterns’ counsel applied for, and the county prosecutor issued, warrants for their arrest.

While on the run, Whitehead made contact with the Sterns via telephone. William Stern, on the advice of counsel, recorded these conversations. Tapes were later introduced as evidence during court proceedings. In one 45-minute-long conversation, Mrs Whitehead threatens to kill Baby M multiple times: "I gave her life. I can take her life away," and "Forget it, Bill. I’ll tell you right now, I’d rather see me and her dead before you get her."

== Trial and appeal ==
On March 31, 1987, New Jersey Superior Court Judge Harvey R. Sorkow formally validated the surrogacy contract and awarded custody of Melissa to the Sterns under a "best interest of the child analysis". Judge Sorkow enforced the contract (signed by both parties before the child was conceived) and terminated the parental rights of the birth mother. He based the custody decision on the best interests of the child, taking into account testimony on the stability of Whitehead and Stern and their respective family situations, and also found that the surrogate parenting agreement was valid and enforceable. Whitehead's parental rights were terminated and Elizabeth Stern was taken into chambers immediately after the ruling was read to formalize the adoption.

Whitehead appealed the decision. While on appeal, the Supreme Court of New Jersey continued the visitation schedule as it was during the initial trial while they considered their ruling. Whitehead took several actions either to claim the child, or incite the Sterns, including returning her wearing a hand-lettered shirt saying "I have a brother and sister."

On February 3, 1988, the Supreme Court of New Jersey, led by Chief Justice Robert Wilentz, invalidated surrogacy contracts as against public policy but in dicta affirmed the trial court's use of a "best interest of the child" analysis and remanded the case to family court. The Court held the contract to be unenforceable and restored Whitehead's parental rights, leaving the terms of her visitation rights as noncustodial parent to be established by the trial court.

On remand, the lower court awarded custody to the Sterns and Whitehead was given visitation rights.

== Legal significance ==
The case attracted much attention as it demonstrated that the possibilities of third party reproduction raise novel legal and social questions about the meaning of parenthood and the possibility of contracting around issues of pregnancy and childbirth. Among other points of contention, feminists argued about whether a woman's basic human right to make decisions about her own body implied the ability to contract away parental rights to a child born to her, or whether recognizing such a right would entail too great risks of exploitation.

The New Jersey court's finding that no contract can alter the legal position of a woman who bears a child as that child's mother seemed to settle the question of the status of surrogacy contracts in America, at least until technological advances permitting gestational surrogacy—in which a woman can bear and give birth to a child to whom she has no genetic relation—reopened the question in many jurisdictions.

At least in New Jersey, however, the Baby M. ruling continues as precedent. In 2009, New Jersey Superior Court ruled that In re Baby M applies to gestational surrogacy as well as traditional surrogacy cases, in A.G.R. v. D.R.H & S.H.. The intended parents were a homosexual male couple. They created an embryo using an anonymous donor ovum and the sperm of one of the husbands. The sister of the other husband carried the embryo to term and originally delivered the child to her brother and his husband, but a year later asserted her own parental rights even though she was not a genetic parent to the child. Judge Francis Schultz relied on In re Baby M to recognize the gestational mother as the child's legal mother. However, a later ruling in 2011 awarded full custody to the biological father.

== Aftermath ==
The Whiteheads divorced and Mary Beth married Dean Gould. The couple had two children.

Mary Beth and her ex-husband Richard sued ICNY and its founder, Noel Keane, claiming they committed fraud in the Baby M contract. The suit questioned whether Mrs. Whitehead Gould was properly counseled before becoming a surrogate mother. The parties settled out of court and the agreement, signed by Judge Pierre N. Leval of the Federal District Court, dismissed the case without costs or lawyers' fees but does not reveal terms of the settlement. It has been reported Keene and ICNY agreed to pay the couple $30,000 to $40,000.

Mary Beth Whitehead Gould wrote a book about her experience in 1989.

The Sterns continued to shun media attention. After reaching the age of maturity in March 2004, Melissa Stern legally terminated Mary Beth's parental rights and formalized Elizabeth's maternity through adoption proceedings. "I love my family very much and am very happy to be with them," Melissa told a reporter for the New Jersey Monthly in 2007, referring to the Sterns. "I'm very happy I ended up with them. I love them, they're my best friends in the whole world, and that's all I have to say about it."

Melissa is a graduate of George Washington University with a degree in religion. She completed her master's degree at King's College London, authoring a dissertation entitled 'Reviving Solomon: Modern Day Questions Regarding the Long-term Implications for the Children of Surrogacy Arrangements'.

== In popular culture ==
An ABC Network miniseries, simply titled Baby M, was broadcast in May 1988. The miniseries starred JoBeth Williams as Mary Beth Whitehead, John Shea as William, Bruce Weitz as Mary Beth's husband Rick, Robin Strasser as Elizabeth and Dabney Coleman as Gary Skoloff. The miniseries received seven Emmy nominations, including Outstanding Miniseries, which it did not win. Williams, Shea, Weitz, and Coleman all received nominations for their performances, but only Shea won. Williams also was nominated for a Golden Globe for her performance.

In 1989, Mary Beth Whitehead published her own book about her experiences, A Mother's Story: The Truth About the Baby M Case.

In 1988, artist Martha Rosler made the video "Born to be Sold: Martha Rosler Reads the Strange Case of Baby M".

Mary Beth Whitehead is referenced in the Seinfeld episode "The Bottle Deposit", when Jerry's mechanic (played by Brad Garrett) steals Jerry's car after he feels that Jerry is not caring for it properly.

The case is mentioned in the 2018 film Private Life.

== See also ==
- Surrogacy legal issues
- Surrogacy laws in the United States
