= Surrogacy =

Arrangement in which a woman carries and delivers a child for designated parent(s)

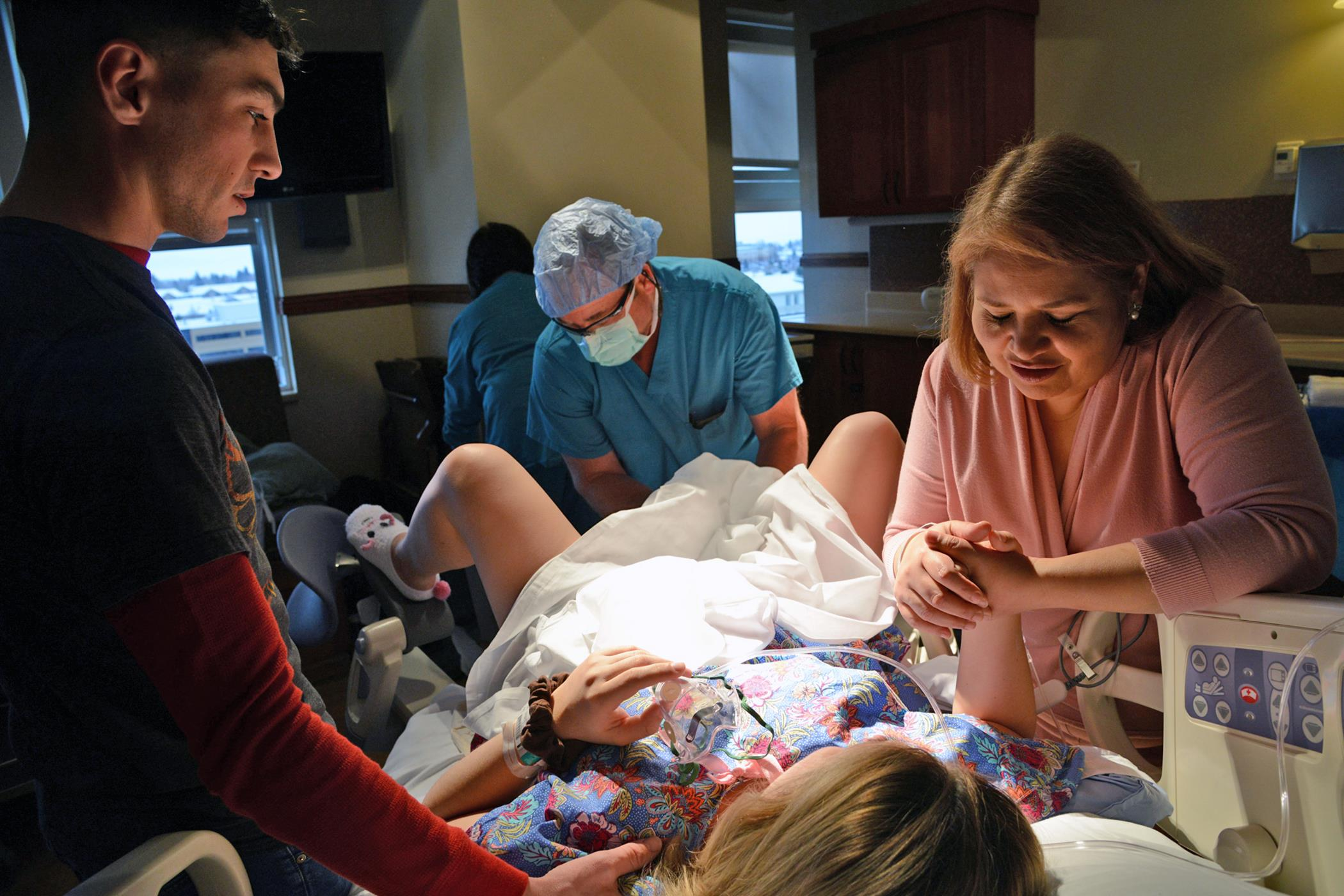
An intended parent attends the birth of her child by a gestational surrogate.

Surrogacy is an arrangement whereby a woman gets pregnant and gives birth on behalf of another person or couple who will become the child's legal parents after birth. People pursue surrogacy for a variety of reasons such as infertility, dangers or undesirable factors of pregnancy, or when pregnancy is a medical impossibility.

A surrogacy relationship or legal agreement contains the person who carries the pregnancy and gives birth and the person or persons who take custody of the child after birth. The person giving birth is the gestational carrier, sometimes referred to as the birth mother, surrogate mother or surrogate. Those taking custody are called the commissioning or intended parents. The biological mother may be the surrogate, the intended parent, or neither. Gestational carriers are usually introduced to intended parents through third-party agencies, or other matching channels. They are usually required to participate in processes of insemination (no matter traditional or IVF), pregnancy, and delivery.

In surrogacy arrangements, monetary compensation may or may not be involved. Receiving money for the arrangement is known as commercial surrogacy, a practice legally regulated or banned in many countries. The legality and cost of surrogacy varies widely between jurisdictions, contributing to fertility tourism, and sometimes resulting in problematic international or interstate surrogacy arrangements. For example, those living in a country where surrogacy is banned travel to a jurisdiction that permits it. In some countries, surrogacy is legal if there is no financial gain.

Where commercial surrogacy is legal, third-party agencies may assist by finding a surrogate and arranging a surrogacy contract with her. These agencies often obtain medical tests to ensure healthy gestation and delivery. They also usually facilitate legal matters concerning the intended parents and the gestational carrier.

== Methods ==
Surrogacy refers to an arrangement where a woman carries a child for intended parents. In some cases, it is specified as traditional surrogacy, where the gestational carrier's own egg is used. More commonly, surrogacy is when the egg comes from someone other than the gestational carrier, making the legal and emotional boundaries clearer.

=== Surrogacy ===
Surrogacy (also known as host or full surrogacy) was first achieved in April 1986. It takes place when an embryo created by in vitro fertilization (IVF) technology is transferred to a gestational carrier. Surrogacy has several forms, and in each form, the resulting child is genetically unrelated to the surrogate:

- The embryo is created using the intended father's sperm and the intended mother's eggs;
- The embryo is created using the intended father's sperm and a donor egg;
- The embryo is created using the intended mother's egg and donor sperm;
- A donor embryo is transferred to a gestational carrier. Such an embryo may be available when others undergoing IVF have embryos left over, which they donate to others. The resulting child is genetically unrelated to the gestational carrier and the intended parents.

=== Traditional surrogacy ===
A traditional surrogacy (also known as partial, natural, or straight surrogacy) is one where the gestational carrier's egg is fertilised by the intended father's or a donor's sperm.

Insemination of the gestational carrier can be either through sex (natural insemination) or artificial insemination. Using the sperm of a donor results in a child who is not genetically related to the intended parents. If the intended father's sperm is used in the insemination, the resulting child is genetically related to both him and the gestational carrier.

== Risks ==
=== Embryo ===
The embryo transferred to the gestational carrier faces the same risks as any embryo transferred through IVF. Pre-transfer risks of the embryo include unintentional epigenetic effects, influence of media which the embryo is cultured on, and undesirable consequences of invasive manipulation of the embryo. Often, multiple embryos are transferred to increase the chance of success, and if multiple gestations occur, both the gestational carrier and the embryos face higher risks of complications.

Children born through singleton IVF surrogacy have been shown to have no physical or mental abnormalities compared to those children born through natural conception. However, children born through multiple gestation by gestational carriers often result in preterm labor and delivery, resulting in prematurity and physical or mental anomalies.

=== Gestational carriers ===
Overall, the medical risks for the gestational carrier, such as pre-eclampsia, are higher than if she were carrying her own genetically related baby. Research showing that gestational carriers have a smaller chance of medical complications such as hypertensive disorder during pregnancy compared to mothers pregnant by oocyte donation are usually comparing younger, healthier, fertile gestational carriers against older, less healthy, infertile women using assisted reproductive technology.

About 5% of surrogate pregnancies develop placenta previa or placental abruptions, which can cause dangerous complications for both the gestational carrier and the baby.

In some countries, such as China, there exists a gap in the legal framework between the legislation and regulation for surrogacy. There can be an increase in the safety risks of artificial surgeries such as egg retrieval and insemination. Moreover, any underground contracts can inflict serious psychological harm on gestational carriers. Surrogacy agencies have ignored gestational carriers health risks which has led to death and have enforced foetal sex selection through abortions. Multiple embryo transfers and foetal reduction procedures may also be repeated on the same gestational carrier, causing health hazards such as miscarriage, infertility, and even death.

== Outcomes ==
Among gestational surrogacy arrangements, between 19–33% of gestational carriers will successfully become pregnant from an embryo transfer. Of these cases, 30–70% will result in live birth.

For surrogate pregnancies where only one child is born, the preterm birth rate in surrogacy is marginally lower than babies born from standard IVF (11.5% vs 14%). Both of these rates are higher than the global average. Babies born from surrogacy also have similar average gestational age as infants born through in vitro fertilization and oocyte donation, at approximately 37 weeks. Preterm birth rate was higher for surrogate twin pregnancies compared to single births. There are fewer babies with low birth weight when born through surrogacy compared to those born through in vitro fertilization but both methods have similar rates of birth defects.

== Indications for surrogacy ==
Opting for surrogacy is a choice for single men desiring to raise a child from infancy, same gender couples unable or unwilling for pregnancy, or women unable or unwilling to carry children on their own. Surrogacy is chosen by women for a number of medical reasons, such as abnormal or absent uterus, either congenitally (also known as Mayer–Rokitansky–Kuster–Hauser syndrome) or post-hysterectomy. Women may have a hysterectomy due to complications in childbirth such as heavy bleeding or a ruptured uterus. Medical diseases such as cervical cancer or endometrial cancer can also lead to surgical removal of the uterus. Past implantation failures, history of multiple miscarriages, or concurrent severe heart or renal conditions that can make pregnancy harmful may also prompt women to consider surrogacy.

== Gestational surrogacy ==
In gestational surrogacy, the child is not biologically related to the surrogate, who is often referred to as a gestational carrier. Instead, the embryo is created via in vitro fertilization (IVF), using the eggs and sperm of the intended parents or donors, and is then transferred to the surrogate. Because gestational surrogacy includes at least one round of IVF, it is always more expensive than a round of IVF alone.

According to recommendations made by the European Society of Human Reproduction and Embryology and American Society for Reproductive Medicine, a gestational carrier is preferably between the ages of 21 and 45, has had one full-term, uncomplicated pregnancy where she successfully had at least one child, and has had no more than five deliveries or three Caesarean sections.

The International Federation of Gynaecology and Obstetrics recommends that the surrogate's autonomy should be respected throughout the pregnancy even if her wishes conflict with what the intended parents want.

The International Federation of Gynecology and Obstetrics (FIGO) stated in a 2025 position statement that traditional surrogacy should be discouraged while gestational surrogacy should be supported as long as there are ethical safeguards. These safeguards include consent and protection against exploitation.

FIGO also said that surrogates should get independent legal advice and psychological support. The organization also said that there should be rules for cross-border surrogacy arrangements.

The most commonly reported motivation given by gestational surrogates is an altruistic desire to help a childless couple. Other less commonly given reasons include enjoying the experience of pregnancy, and financial compensation.

== History ==
Having another woman bear a child for a couple to raise, usually with the male half of the couple as the genetic father, has been referenced a couple of times in historical text, but does not seem to ever have been a common practice. Babylonian law and custom allowed this practice, and a woman unable to give birth could use the practice to avoid a divorce, which would otherwise be inevitable.

Many developments in medicine, social customs, and legal proceedings around the world paved the way for modern surrogacy:

- 1936 – In the U.S., drug companies Schering-Kahlbaum and Parke-Davis started the pharmaceutical production of estrogen.
- 1944 – Harvard Medical School professor John Rock became the first person to fertilize a human ovum outside the uterus.
- 1953 – Researchers successfully performed the first cryopreservation of sperm.
- 1976 – Michigan lawyer Noel Keane wrote the first surrogacy contract in the United States.
- 1978 – Louise Brown, the first "test-tube baby", was born in England, the product of the first successful IVF procedure.
- 1985–1986 – A woman carried the first successful gestational surrogate pregnancy.
- 1986 – Melissa Stern, otherwise known as "Baby M," was born in the U.S. The surrogate and biological mother, Mary Beth Whitehead, refused to give up custody of Melissa to the couple with whom she made the surrogacy agreement. The courts of New Jersey found that Whitehead was the child's legal mother and declared contracts for gestational carrierhood illegal and invalid. However, the court found it in the best interest of the infant to award custody of Melissa to the child's biological father, William Stern, and his wife Elizabeth Stern, rather than to Whitehead, the gestational carrier.
- 1990 – In California, gestational carrier Anna Johnson refused to give up the baby to intended parents Mark and Crispina Calvert. The couple sued her for custody (Calvert v. Johnson), and the court upheld their parental rights. In doing so, it defined the legal mother as the woman who, according to the surrogacy agreement, intends to create and raise a child.
- 2009 – Ukraine, one of the most requested countries in Europe for this treatment, has its first surrogacy law approved.
- 2015 – India prohibits commercial surrogacy for foreigners over concerns the country has become a hub for reproductive tourism.
- 2016 – A Swedish government inquiry recommends banning all surrogacy in Sweden and taking steps to prevent its citizens from doing it abroad.
- 2021 – The Supreme Court of Mexico ruled that every individual, regardless of sexual orientation, marital status, or nationality, has the right to access assisted reproductive technology to form a family, and that the Civil Code of the state of Tabasco that restricts surrogacy to Mexican married couples is unconstitutional. It also ruled that legal parentage should be based on the presence of procreational will, not genetic or gestational relationship.
- 2024 – Italy bans surrogacy both at home and abroad, making it illegal for Italian citizens to travel abroad for surrogacy.
- 2025 – Slovakia passes a constitutional amendment that bans surrogacy.
- 2026 — Jill Rudnitzky Brand, the first baby born via gestational surrogacy—where the surrogate carrier was not biologically related to the child—turns 40.

== Psychological concerns ==
=== Surrogate ===
Anthropological studies of surrogates have shown that surrogates engage in various distancing techniques throughout the surrogate pregnancy so as to avoid becoming emotionally attached to the baby. Many surrogates intentionally try to foster the development of emotional attachment between the intended mother and the surrogate child.

Although gestational surrogates generally report being satisfied with their experience as surrogates, there are cases in which they are not. Unmet expectations are associated with dissatisfaction. Some women did not feel a certain level of closeness with the couple and others did not feel respected by the couple. Some gestational surrogates report emotional distress during the process of surrogacy. There may be a lack of access to therapy and emotional support through the surrogate process.

Gestational surrogates may struggle with postpartum depression and issues with relinquishing the child to their intended parents. Immediate postpartum depression has been observed in gestational surrogates at a rate of 0-20%. Some surrogates report negative feelings with relinquishing rights to the child immediately after birth, but most negative feelings resolve after some time.

=== Child and intended parents ===
A systematic review of 55 studies examining the outcomes for surrogacy for surrogates and resulting families showed that there were no major psychological differences in children up to the age of 10 years old that were born from surrogacy compared to those children born from other assisted reproductive technology or those children conceived naturally.

Gay men who have become fathers using surrogacy have reported similar experiences to those of other couples who have used surrogacy, including their relationship with both their child and their surrogate.

A study has followed a cohort of 32 surrogacy, 32 egg donation, and 54 natural conception families through to age seven, reporting the impact of surrogacy on the families and children at ages one, two, and seven. At age one, parents through surrogacy showed greater psychological well-being and adaptation to parenthood than those who conceived naturally; there were no differences in infant temperament. At age two, parents through surrogacy showed more positive mother–child relationships and less parenting stress on the part of fathers than their natural conception counterparts; there were no differences in child development between these two groups. At age seven, the surrogacy and egg donation families showed less positive mother–child interaction than the natural conception families, but there were no differences in maternal positive or negative attitudes or child adjustment. The researchers concluded that the surrogacy families continued to function well.

== Legal issues ==
The legality of surrogacy varies around the world. Many countries do not have laws which specifically deal with surrogacy. Some countries ban surrogacy outright, while others ban commercial surrogacy but allow altruistic surrogacy (in which the surrogate is not financially compensated). Some countries allow commercial surrogacy, with few restrictions. Some jurisdictions extend a ban on surrogacy to international surrogacy. In some jurisdictions rules applicable to adoptions apply while others do not regulate the practice.

Commercial surrogacy is banned in Canada, Australia and most of Europe.

The US, Ukraine, Russia and Georgia have the least restrictive laws in the world, allowing commercial surrogacy, including for foreigners. Surrogacy is legal and common in Iran, and monetary remuneration is practiced and allowed by religious authorities.

Several Asian countries used to have less restrictive laws, but the practice has since been restricted. In 2013, Thailand banned commercial surrogacy, and restricted altruistic surrogacy to Thai couples. In 2016, Cambodia also banned commercial surrogacy. Nepal, Mexico, and India have also recently banned foreign commercial surrogacy.

Laws dealing with surrogacy must deal with:

- Enforceability of surrogacy agreements. In some jurisdictions, they are void or prohibited, and some jurisdictions distinguish between commercial and altruistic surrogacy.
- The different issues raised by traditional and gestational surrogacy.
- Mechanisms for the legal recognition of the intended parents as the legal parents, either by pre-birth orders or by post-birth adoption.

Although laws differ widely from one jurisdiction to another, some generalizations are possible:

If the jurisdiction specifically bans surrogacy, however, and authorities find out about the arrangement, there may be financial and legal consequences for the parties involved. One jurisdiction (Quebec) prevented the genetic mother's adoption of the child even though that left the child with no legal mother.

Some jurisdictions specifically prohibit only commercial and not altruistic surrogacy. Even jurisdictions that do not prohibit surrogacy may rule that surrogacy contracts (commercial, altruistic, or both) are void. If the contract is either prohibited or void, then there is no recourse if one party to the agreement has a change of heart: if a surrogate changes her mind and decides to keep the child, the intended mother has no claim to the child even if it is her genetic offspring, and the couple cannot get back any money they may have paid the surrogate; if the intended parents change their mind and do not want the child after all, the surrogate cannot get any money to make up for the expenses, or any promised payment, and she will be left with legal custody of the child.

Jurisdictions that permit surrogacy sometimes offer a way for the intended mother, especially if she is also the genetic mother, to be recognized as the legal mother without going through the process of abandonment and adoption. Often this is via a birth order in which a court rules on the legal parentage of a child. These orders usually require the consent of all parties involved, sometimes even including the husband of a married gestational surrogate. Most jurisdictions provide for only a post-birth order, often out of an unwillingness to force the gestational carrier to give up parental rights if she changes her mind after the birth.

A few jurisdictions do provide for pre-birth orders, generally only in cases when the gestational carrier is not genetically related to the expected child. Some jurisdictions impose other requirements in order to issue birth orders: for example, that the intended parents be heterosexual and married to one another. Jurisdictions that provide for pre-birth orders are also more likely to provide for some kind of enforcement of surrogacy contracts.

=== Citizenship ===
The citizenship and legal status of the children resulting from surrogacy arrangements can be problematic. The Hague Conference Permanent Bureau identified the question of citizenship of these children as a "pressing problem" in the Permanent Bureau 2014 Study (Hague Conference Permanent Bureau, 2014a: 84–94). According to U.S. Department of State, Bureau of Consular Affairs, for a child born abroad to be a U.S. citizen one or both of the child's genetic parents must be a U.S. citizen. In other words, the only way for a foreign born surrogate child to acquire U.S. citizenship automatically at birth is if they are the biological child of a U.S. citizen. Furthermore, in some countries, the child will not be a citizen of the country in which they are born because the gestational carrier is not legally the parent of said child. This could result in a child being born without citizenship.

=== Canada ===
"In Canada, it is a crime to pay (in cash, goods, property or services), offer to pay or advertise to pay a woman to be a surrogate mother."

=== Asia ===
In South Korea, Hong Kong, Malaysia, Thailand, and India, surrogacies are all regulated "through national laws that expressly ban it or explicitly set the parameters for its legality".

==== South Korea ====
In Korea, it is illegal to provide or use embryos. Violators are subject to imprisonment of up to three years. However, it is neither legal nor illegal to provide or use a uterus. There is no direct law on surrogacy.

- Bioethics and Safety Act Article 23 (Obligations regarding Production of Embryos)

(3)	No person shall provide or utilize embryos, sperms or eggs, or induce or assist in providing or utilizing them for the purpose of receiving monetary benefits, property interests or other personal benefits in return.

==== China ====
In China, surrogacy operates within a legal grey area. In 2001, the Ministry of Health issued a decree that banned surrogacy, but there is no national law that prohibits surrogacy. The government frequently punishes doctors and hospitals involved in the practice. Any medical organization involved in surrogacy is considered in violation, including any institution that organizes, implements, or facilitates egg retrieval and sale. However, investigations in 2014 and 2019 found that more than 400 surrogacy agencies facilitated the birth of more than 10,000 surrogate children each year.

Due to such blurry legal issues, surrogate mothers have become an underprivileged group facing the oppression of women's reproductive rights and the lack of formal legal restrictions. Many of the conditions they should have, such as emotional caring and social resources, are absent, as research claiming that surrogacy contracts usually blindly meet client needs while ignoring the health and well-being of the surrogate mothers. They are marginalized by society and lack the companionship of their partners and legitimate medical health checkups during the nearly one year of pregnancy.

Some scholars claim that surrogacy incites social instability both for the Chinese government and the public, such as civil disputes, gender disproportion, crime, and the spread of disease. Surrogacy has been argued to contradict traditional Chinese values related to blood ties and family ties.

=== Australia ===
"Australian states and territories allow altruistic surrogacy but prohibit commercial surrogacy."

=== Europe ===
Some countries in Europe allow altruistic surrogacy (where the surrogate is not paid), but most European countries prohibit commercial surrogacy.

== Ethical issues ==
Numerous ethical questions have been raised with regards to surrogacy. They generally stem from concerns relating to social justice, women's rights, child welfare, bioethics, and societal traditional values, also called family values.

=== Surrogate ===
Those who view surrogacy as a social justice issue argue that it leads to the exploitation of women whose wombs are commodified to meet the reproductive desires of the more affluent. They argue that creating a commercial market for human bodies is inherently exploitative: "A steady supply of women's bodies is needed in order to meet the demands of rich couples who can afford to pay extravagant fees to agencies."

While some hold that any consensual process is not a human rights violation, other human rights activists argue that human rights are not just about survival but about human dignity and respect. Surrogacy is sometimes being compared with the sale of human organs (e.g., selling a spare kidney) which almost all countries ban and it is argued that renting out the use of human organs and bodily processes should be prohibited for similar reasons.

Some feminists have also argued that surrogacy is an assault to a surrogate's dignity and right to autonomy over her body. By what is described as degrading women to purchasable "baby producers", commercial surrogacy has been accused by feminists of commodifying women's bodies in a manner akin to prostitution. Feminist Renate Klein has argued that surrogacy is a human rights violation. In her book "Surrogacy - a Human Rights Violation", Klein examines the harms done to women who become surrogates, and how the practice breaks a number of conventions on human rights. Feminist Kajsa Ekis Ekman has argued that surrogacy is akin to reproductive prostitution and baby sale. Her book "Being and Being Bought - Prostitution, Surrogacy and the Split Self" compares the two industries and how they both commodify women.

Some feminists also express concerns over links between surrogacy and patriarchal expressions of domination as numerous reports have been cited of women in developing countries coerced into commercial surrogacy by their husbands wanting to "earn money off of their wives' bodies". Surrogate contracts can impose restrictions on the surrogate that violate the surrogate mother's rights, such as right to freedom of movement. These contracts can allow other people to legally impose requirements on the pregnant person that some argue result in "your body, my choice".

Other human rights activists express concern over the conditions under which many gestational carriers are kept by surrogacy clinics which exercise much power and control over the process of surrogate pregnancy. Isolated from friends and family and required to live in separate surrogacy hostels on the pretext of ensuring consistent prenatal care, it is argued that gestational carriers may face psychological challenges that cannot be offset by the economic benefits of surrogacy. Other psychological issues are noted, such as the implications of gestational carriers emotionally detaching themselves from their babies in anticipation of birth departure.

Some argue that women in developing countries are particularly vulnerable to exploitation from surrogacy. Decisions cannot be defined as involving agency if they are driven by coercion, violence, or extreme poverty, which is often the case with women in developing countries who pursue surrogacy due to economic need or aggressive persuasion from their husbands. While opponents of this stance argue that surrogacy provides a much-needed source of revenue for women facing poverty in developing countries, others purport that the lack of legislation in such countries often leads to much of the profit accruing to middlemen and commercial agencies rather than the gestational carriers themselves. Supporters of surrogacy have argued to mandate education of gestational carriers regarding their rights and risks through the process in order to both rectify the ethical issues that arise and to enhance their autonomy. Both opponents and supporters of surrogacy generally agree that implementing international laws on surrogacy can limit the social justice issues that gestational carriers face in transnational surrogacy.

Some argue that commercial surrogacy strips birthmothers of their natural rights. Most countries consider the birthmother to be the legal mother unless she freely chooses to put her child up for adoption (without coercion or payment). When a woman elects to use a donor egg to become pregnant, she is not the biological mother, but is still considered the legal mother because she is the birthmother; similarly, a surrogate is still the birthmother even if she was paid to use a donor egg. Some argue that birth mothers cannot be coerced (or paid) to relinquish their custody of the child they bore (though any birthmother might need to share custody with another). It has been argued that under laws of countries where surrogacy falls under the umbrella of adoption, commercial surrogacy can be considered problematic as it constitutes payment for adoption.

Some labor union activists argue that the harms on surrogates of surrogacy can be reduced by treating it as a form of work, which enables surrogates to use labor action like surrogacy strikes.

=== Child ===
Those concerned with the rights of the child in the context of surrogacy reference issues related to identity and parenthood, abandonment and abuse, and child trafficking.

It is argued that in commercial surrogacy, the rights of the child are often neglected as the baby becomes a mere commodity within an economic transaction of a good and a service. Such opponents of surrogacy argue that transferring the duties of parenthood from the birthing mother to a contracting couple denies the child any claim to its birth mother and to its biological parents if the egg or sperm is not that of the contracting parents. In addition, they claim that the child has no right to information about any siblings they may have in the latter instance. The relevance of disclosing the use of surrogacy as an assisted reproductive technique to the child has also been argued to be important for both health risks and the rights of the child.

It has been argued that bans on surrogacy are violations of human rights under the existing laws of the Inter-American Court of Human Rights reproductive rights landmark. However, "there is no "right to a child" under international law". The United Nations Report of the Special Rapporteur on the sale and sexual exploitation of children states, "A child is not a good or service that the State can guarantee or provide, but rather a rights-bearing human being" and argues that commercial surrogacy (where transfer of the child is a condition for payment) violates human rights as it is considered to be the sale of children (and humans cannot be bought or sold). UNICEF says "A legally binding contractual relationship between the surrogate mother and the intending parent(s) established pre-birth, in which the transfer of the child would be made conditional upon payment, would constitute the sale of a child…. The identity and family relations of a child cannot be for sale."

Surrogacy has raised ethical concerns regarding the number of children an individual can reasonably parent. While reproductive rights generally allow couples to have as many children as naturally possible, some argue that these rights do not necessarily extend to surrogacy or other assisted reproductive technologies. Commercial surrogacy has been associated with cases in which individuals or couples became legal parents to numerous children within a short period, prompting questions about parental motives and potential risks related to human trafficking and child welfare. For example, prior to Thailand’s ban on commercial surrogacy in 2015, a Japanese man reportedly fathered 16 surrogate children in the country in 2014. He allegedly intended to create a very large family and had plans for 10–20 surrogacies annually for the rest of his life.

== Financial aspects ==
According to the Assisted Human Reproduction Act adopted in 2004, it is prohibited in Canada to compensate a female for acting as a surrogate mother or to advertise the payment of such compensation. However, on October 1, 2016, Health Canada announced its intention to update and strengthen the Assisted Human Reproduction Act to regulate the financial aspects of contracts between intended parents and surrogate mothers. According to research, surrogate mothers are mostly motivated by their low socioeconomic status or family debt; they are more likely to be forced into surrogacy due to financial pressures. In 2020, Section 12 of the Assisted Human Reproduction Act provides for the reimbursement of expenses and monetary compensation to the surrogate mother to alleviate the financial burden associated with surrogacy. According to this proposed regulation, the reimbursement of eligible expenses is not obligatory. Aiming at emphasizing the voluntary nature of the gesture. The proposed regulation provides a non-exhaustive list of different categories of eligible expenses, such as parking fees, travel expenses, caregiver expenses, meals, psychological consultations, etc. Additionally, the surrogate mother can be reimbursed for any lost wages during pregnancy if she obtains written confirmation from a qualified physician that the work posed a risk to the pregnancy.

In the US, the total costs for gestational surrogacy usually exceed US$100,000 per pregnancy. This includes hiring an agency to find a woman willing to carry the baby, the medical and health insurance costs for the pregnancy, legal fees, and IVF to create the embryos. Additionally, some people have additional fees for egg or sperm donations, travel, money paid to the surrogate for lost work, maternity clothes, or other expenses.

== Religious issues ==
Different religions take different approaches to surrogacy, often related to their stances on assisted reproductive technology in general.

=== Buddhism ===
Buddhist thought is inconclusive on the matter of surrogacy. The prominent belief is that Buddhism totally accepts surrogacy since there are no Buddhist teachings suggesting that infertility treatments or surrogacy are immoral. This stance is further supported by the common conception that serving as a gestational carrier is an expression of compassion and therefore automatically aligns with Buddhist values.

However, numerous Buddhist thinkers have expressed concerns with certain aspects of surrogacy. One Buddhist perspective on surrogacy arises from the Buddhist belief in reincarnation as a manifestation of karma. According to this view, gestational carrierhood circumvents the workings of karma by interfering with the natural cycle of rebirth.

Others reference the Buddha directly who purportedly taught that trade in sentient beings, including human beings, is not a righteous practice as it almost always involves exploitation that causes suffering. Susumu Shimazono, professor of Religious Studies at the University of Tokyo, contends in the magazine Dharma World that surrogacy places the childbearing surrogate in a position of subservience, in which her body becomes a "tool" for another. Simultaneously, other Buddhist thinkers argue that as long as the primary purpose of being a gestational carrier is out of compassion instead of profit, it is not exploitative and is therefore morally permissible. This further highlights the lack of consensus on surrogacy within the Buddhist community.

=== Christianity ===
==== Catholicism ====
The Roman Catholic Church is opposed to surrogacy, which it views as immoral and incompatible with Biblical texts surrounding topics of birth, marriage, and life. Paragraph 2376 of the Catechism of the Catholic Church states that:

"Techniques that entail the dissociation of husband and wife, by the intrusion of a person other than the couple (donation of sperm or ovum, surrogate uterus), are gravely immoral."

Paragraph 2378 states that

"A child is not something owed to one, but is a gift. [T]he 'supreme gift of marriage' is a human person. A child may not be considered a piece of property, an idea to which an alleged "right to a child" would lead. In this area, only the child possesses genuine rights: the right "to be the fruit of the specific act of the conjugal love of his parents", and "the right to be respected as a person from the moment of his conception".

Many proponents of this stance express concern that the sanctity of marriage may be compromised by the insertion of a third party into the marriage contract.

Additionally, the practice of in vitro fertilisation involved in gestational surrogacy is generally viewed as morally impermissible due to its removal of human conception from the act of sexual intercourse. Roman Catholics also condemn in vitro fertilisation due to the destruction of embryos that accompanies the frequent practice of discarding, freezing, or donating non-implanted eggs to stem cell research. As such, the Roman Catholic Church deems all practices involving in vitro fertilisation, including gestational surrogacy, as morally problematic.

Pope Francis called for a global ban on surrogacy in 2024.

=== Hinduism ===
Surrogacy does not conflict with the Hindu religion. Surrogacy and other scientific methods of assisted reproduction are generally supported within the Hindu community. While Hindu scholars have not debated the issue extensively, T. C. Anand Kumar, an Indian reproductive biologist, argues that there is no conflict between Hinduism and assisted reproduction. Others have supported this stance with reference to Hindu faith, including a story in the Bhagavata Purana which suggests the practice of gestational carrier-hood:

Kamsa, the wicked king of Mathura, had imprisoned his sister Devaki and her husband Vasudeva because oracles had informed him that her child would be his killer. Every time she delivered a child, he smashed its head on the floor. He killed six children. When the seventh child was conceived, the gods intervened. They summoned the goddess Yogamaya and had her transfer the fetus from the womb of Devaki to the womb of Rohini (Vasudeva's other wife who lived with her sister Yashoda across the river Yamuna, in the village of cowherds at Gokulam). Thus the child conceived in one womb was incubated in and delivered through another womb.

Additionally, infertility is often associated with karma in the Hindu tradition and consequently treated as a pathology to be treated. This has led to general acceptance of medical intervention for addressing infertility amongst Hindus. As such, surrogacy and other scientific methods of assisted reproduction are generally supported within the Hindu community. Nonetheless, Hindu women do not commonly use surrogacy as an option to treat infertility, despite often serving as surrogates for Western commissioning couples. When surrogacy is practiced by Hindus, it is more likely to be used within the family circle as opposed to involving anonymous donors.

=== Islam ===
For Muslims, the Qur'anic injunction that "their mothers are only those who conceived them and gave birth to them (waladna hum)" denies the distinction between genetic and gestational mothers, hence complicating notions of lineage within the context of surrogacy, which are central to the Muslim faith.

=== Jainism ===
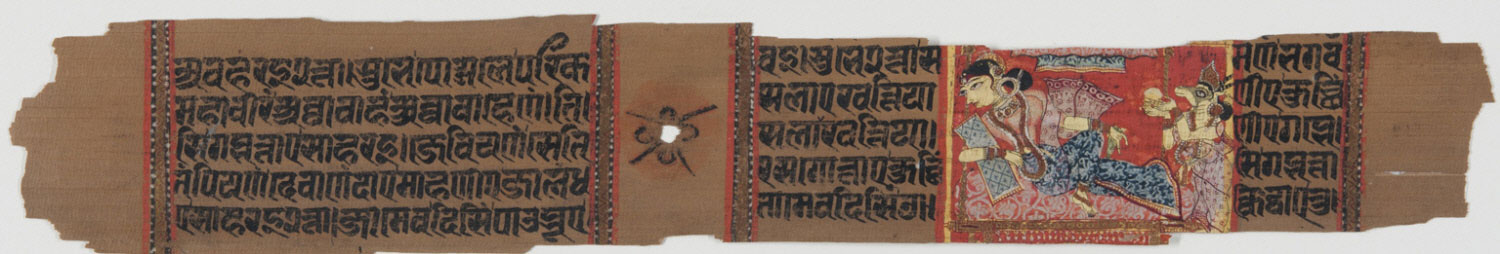
Harinegameshin Transfers Mahavira's Embryo, from a Kalpasutra manuscript, c. 1300–1350, Philadelphia Museum of Art

Jain scholars have not debated the issue of surrogacy extensively. Nonetheless, the practice of surrogacy is referenced in the Śvētāmbara tradition of Jainism according to which the embryo of Lord Mahavira was transferred from a Brahmin woman Devananada to the womb of Trishala, the queen of Kshatriya ruler Siddharth, by a divinity named Harinegameshin. This account is not present in Digambara Jain texts, however.

Other sources state that surrogacy is not objectionable in the Jain view as it is seen as a physical operation akin to any other medical treatment used to treat a bodily deficiency. However, some religious concerns related to surrogacy have been raised within the Jain community including the loss of non-implanted embryos, destruction of traditional marriage relationships, and adulterous implications of gestational surrogacy.

=== Judaism ===
In general, there is a lack of consensus within the Jewish community on the matter of surrogacy. Jewish scholars and rabbis have long debated this topic, expressing conflicting views on both sides of the debate.

Those supportive of surrogacy within the Jewish religion generally view it as a morally permissible way for Jewish women who cannot conceive to fulfill their religious obligations of procreation. Rabbis who favour this stance often cite Genesis 9:1 which commands all Jews to "be fruitful and multiply". In 1988, the Committee on Jewish Law and Standards associated with the Conservative Jewish movement issued formal approval for surrogacy, concluding that "the mitzvah of parenthood is so great that ovum surrogacy is permissible".

Jewish scholars and rabbis which hold an anti-surrogacy stance often see it as a form of modern slavery wherein women's bodies are exploited and children are commodified. As Jews possess the religious obligation to "actively engage in the redemption of those who are enslaved", practices seen as involving human exploitation are morally condemned. This thinking aligns with concerns brought forth by other groups regarding the relation between surrogacy practices and forms of human trafficking in certain countries with large fertility tourism industries. Several Jewish scholars and rabbis also cite ethical concerns surrounding the "broken relationship" between the child and its surrogate birth mother. Rabbi Immanuel Jacovits, chief rabbi of the United Hebrew Congregation from 1976 to 1991, reported in his 1975 publication Jewish Medical Ethics that "to use another person as an incubator and then take from her the child that she carried and delivered for a fee is a revolting degradation of maternity and an affront to human dignity."

Another point of contention surrounding surrogacy within the Jewish community is the issue of defining motherhood. There are generally three conflicting views on this topic: 1) the ovum donor is the mother, 2) the gestational carrier is the mother, and 3) the child has two mothers—both the ovum donor and the gestational carrier. While most contend that parenthood is determined by the woman giving birth, a minority opt to consider the genetic parents the legal parents, citing the well-known passage in Sanhedrin 91b of the Talmud which states that life begins at conception. Also controversial is the issue of defining Judaism in the context of surrogacy. Jewish Law states that if a Jewish woman is the surrogate, then the child is Jewish. However, this often raises issues when the child is raised by a non-Jewish family and approaches for addressing this issue are also widely debated within the Jewish community. An increasing number of orthodox rabbis recommend that babies born through surrogacy who were created from non-Jewish donor eggs or carried by a non-Jewish surrogate should undergo conversion for minors in order to eliminate doubt over their Jewish status

== Fertility tourism ==
Some countries, such as the United States, Canada, Greece, Georgia and Mexico are popular surrogacy destinations for foreign intended parents. Ukraine, Belarus and Russia were also destinations before the Russian invasion of Ukraine. Eligibility, processes and costs differ from country to country. Fertility tourism for surrogacy is driven by legal restrictions in the home country or the incentive of lower prices abroad. Previously popular destinations, India, Nepal and Thailand have all recently implemented bans on commercial surrogacy for non-residents. China is also a famous destination, even though surrogacy is legally banned.

== See also ==
- Adoption
- Artificial insemination
- Bioethics
- Commercial animal cloning
- Egg donation
- Embryo transfer
- Fertility
- Infertility
- Sexual surrogate
- Sperm donation
- Surrogacy laws by country
- Third-party reproduction
- Mitochondrial replacement therapy
