= Follicular phase =

Phase of the estrous or menstrual cycle

Menstrual cycle illustrating hormone levels, follicle development and uterine cycle

The follicular phase, also known as the preovulatory phase is the phase in the ovarian cycle concurrent with the proliferative phase of the uterine cycle. It is the phase in the ovarian cycle of the menstrual cycle during which primordial follicles in the ovary develop to primary follicles, and secondary follicles to a fully mature antral follicle (Graafian follicle), containing a mature egg cell. The follicular phase ends with ovulation. The main hormones controlling this stage are gonadotropin-releasing hormones, follicle-stimulating hormones and luteinising hormones released by pulsatile secretion. The duration of the follicular phase can differ depending on the length of the menstrual cycle while the luteal phase typically lasts around 14 days.

== Hormonal events ==
=== Protein secretion ===
Due to the increase of FSH, the protein inhibin B will be secreted by the granulosa cells. Inhibin B will eventually blunt the secretion of FSH toward the end of the follicular phase. Inhibin B levels will be highest during the LH surge before ovulation and will quickly decrease after.

=== Follicle recruitment ===
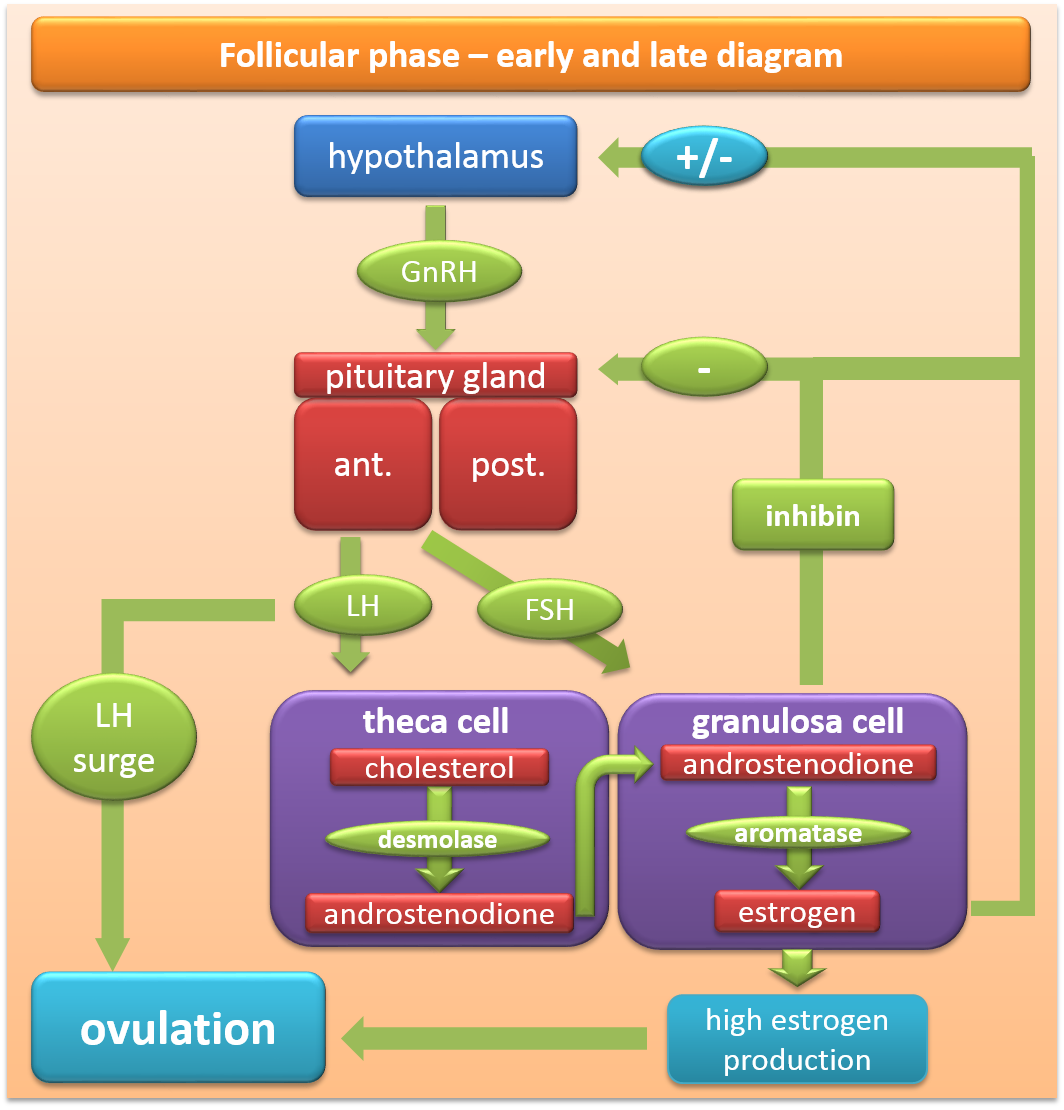
Follicular phase diagram of hormones and their origins

Follicle-stimulating hormone (FSH) is secreted by the anterior pituitary gland. FSH secretion begins to rise in the last few days of the previous menstrual cycle, and is the highest and most important during the first week of the follicular phase. The rise in FSH levels recruits five to seven tertiary-stage ovarian follicles (this stage follicle is also known as a Graafian follicle or antral follicle) for entry into the menstrual cycle. These follicles, that have been growing for the better part of a year in a process known as folliculogenesis, compete with each other for dominance.

FSH induces the rise in numbers of granulosa cells in the developing follicles, and the expression of luteinizing hormone (LH) receptors on these granulosa cells. Under the influence of FSH, aromatase and p450 enzymes are activated, causing the granulosa cells to begin to secrete estrogen. This increased level of estrogen stimulates production of gonadotropin-releasing hormone (GnRH), which increases production of LH. LH induces androgen synthesis by thecal cells, stimulates proliferation, differentiation, and secretion of follicular thecal cells and increases LH receptor expression on granulosa cells.

Throughout the entire follicular phase, rising estrogen levels in the blood stimulates growth of the endometrium and myometrium of the uterus. It also causes endometrial cells to produce receptors for progesterone, which helps prime the endometrium to respond to rising levels of progesterone during the late proliferative phase and throughout the luteal phase.

=== Estrogen surge ===
Two or three days before LH levels begin to increase, usually by day seven of the cycle, one (or occasionally two) of the recruited follicles has emerged as dominant. Many endocrinologists believe that the estrogen secretion of the dominant follicle has increased to a level that GnRH production is suppressed, which lowers the levels of LH and FSH. This slowdown in LH and FSH production leads to the atresia (death) of most of the recruited follicles, though the dominant follicle continues to mature. Estrogen levels will continue to increase for several days (on average, six days, but this varies widely).

These high estrogen levels initiate the formation of a new layer of endometrium in the uterus, histologically identified as the proliferative endometrium. Crypts in the cervix are also stimulated to produce fertile cervical mucus. This mucus reduces the acidity of the vagina, creating a more hospitable environment for sperm. It also has a characteristic texture that helps guide sperm through the cervix and to the fallopian tubes, where they wait for ovulation. In addition, basal body temperature may lower slightly under the influence of high estrogen levels.

=== LH surge and ovulation ===
Estrogen levels are highest right before the LH surge begins. The short-term drop in steroid hormones between the beginning of the LH surge and the event of ovulation may cause mid-cycle spotting or bleeding. Under the influence of the preovulatory LH surge, the first meiotic division of the oocytes is completed. The surge also initiates luteinization of thecal and granulosa cells. Ovulation normally occurs 30 (± 2) hours after the beginning of the LH surge (when LH is first detectable in urine).

== Follicular waves ==
Follicular waves are best described as the phase when follicles have matured sufficiently and rupture, leading to ovulation. Recent findings into the menstrual cycle in mammals has discovered that 2 or more follicles can develop but only one of the follicles fully matures to release the egg. This follicular wave involves multiple surges in the levels of FSH to initiate follicular development. A study has found that 68% of women tended to display two follicular wave developments before ovulation while the remaining had three waves.
