= Menstrual cycle =

Natural changes in the human female reproductive system

Menstrual cycle

The menstrual cycle is a series of natural changes in hormone production and the structures of the uterus and ovaries of the female reproductive system that makes pregnancy possible. The ovarian cycle controls the production and release of eggs and the cyclic release of estrogen and progesterone. The uterine cycle governs the preparation and maintenance of the lining of the uterus (womb) to receive an embryo. These cycles are concurrent and coordinated, normally last between 21 and 35 days, with a median length of 28 days. Menarche (the onset of the first period) usually occurs around the age of 12 years; menstrual cycles continue for about 30–45 years.

Naturally occurring hormones drive the cycles; the cyclical rise and fall of the follicle stimulating hormone prompts the production and growth of oocytes (immature egg cells). The hormone estrogen stimulates the uterus lining (endometrium) to thicken to accommodate an embryo should fertilization occur. The blood supply of the thickened lining provides nutrients to a successfully implanted embryo. If implantation does not occur, the lining breaks down and blood is released. Triggered by falling progesterone levels, menstruation (commonly referred to as a "period") is the cyclical shedding of the lining, and is a sign that pregnancy has not occurred.

Each cycle occurs in phases based on events either in the ovary (ovarian cycle) or in the uterus (uterine cycle). The ovarian cycle consists of the follicular phase, ovulation, and the luteal phase; the uterine cycle consists of the menstrual, proliferative and secretory phases. Day one of the menstrual cycle is the first day of the period, which lasts for about 5 days. Around day fourteen, an egg is usually released from the ovary.

The menstrual cycle can cause some women to experience premenstrual syndrome with symptoms that may include tender breasts, and tiredness. More severe symptoms that affect daily living are classed as premenstrual dysphoric disorder, and are experienced by 3–8% of women. During the first few days of menstruation some women experience period pain that can spread from the abdomen to the back and upper thighs. The menstrual cycle can be modified by hormonal birth control.

== Cycles and phases ==
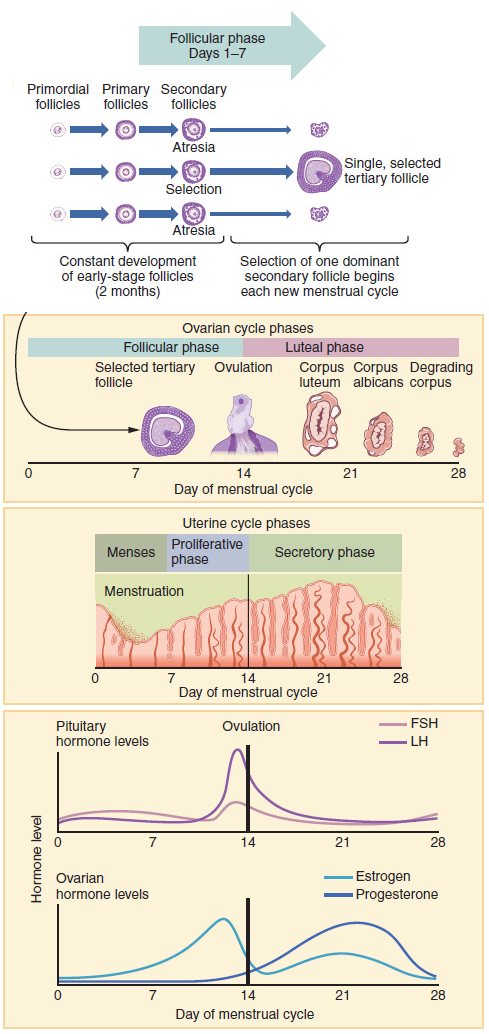
Progression of the menstrual cycle and some of the hormones contributing to it

The menstrual cycle encompasses the ovarian and uterine cycles. The ovarian cycle describes changes that occur in the follicles of the ovary, whereas the uterine cycle describes changes in the endometrial lining of the uterus. Both cycles can be divided into phases. The ovarian cycle consists of alternating follicular and luteal phases, and the uterine cycle consists of the menstrual phase, the proliferative phase, and the secretory phase. The menstrual cycle is controlled by the hypothalamus in the brain, and the anterior pituitary gland at the base of the brain. The hypothalamus releases gonadotropin-releasing hormone (GnRH), which causes the nearby anterior pituitary to release follicle-stimulating hormone (FSH) and luteinizing hormone (LH). Before puberty, GnRH is released in low steady quantities and at a steady rate. After puberty, GnRH is released in large pulses, and the frequency and magnitude of these determine how much FSH and LH are produced by the pituitary.

Measured from the first day of one menstruation to the first day of the next, the length of a menstrual cycle varies but has a median length of 28 days. The cycle is often less regular at the beginning and end of a woman's reproductive life. At puberty, a child's body begins to mature into an adult body capable of sexual reproduction; the first period (called menarche) occurs at around 12 years of age and continues for about 30–45 years. Menstrual cycles end at menopause, which is usually between 45 and 55 years of age.

=== Ovarian cycle ===
Between menarche and menopause the ovaries regularly alternate between luteal and follicular phases during the monthly menstrual cycle. Stimulated by gradually increasing amounts of estrogen in the follicular phase, discharges of blood flow stop and the uterine lining thickens. Follicles in the ovary begin developing under the influence of a complex interplay of hormones, and after several days one, or occasionally two, become dominant, while non-dominant follicles shrink and die. About mid-cycle, some 10–12 hours after the increase in luteinizing hormone, known as the LH surge, the dominant follicle releases an oocyte, in an event called ovulation.

After ovulation, the oocyte lives for 24 hours or less without fertilization, while the remains of the dominant follicle in the ovary become a corpus luteum – a body with the primary function of producing large amounts of the hormone progesterone. (Note: Progesterone levels exceed those of estrogen (estradiol) by a hundred-fold.) Under the influence of progesterone, the uterine lining changes to prepare for potential implantation of an embryo to establish a pregnancy. The thickness of the endometrium continues to increase in response to mounting levels of estrogen, which is released by the antral follicle (a mature ovarian follicle) into the blood circulation. Peak levels of estrogen are reached at around day thirteen of the cycle and coincide with ovulation. If implantation does not occur within about two weeks, the corpus luteum degenerates into the corpus albicans, which does not produce hormones, causing a sharp drop in levels of both progesterone and estrogen. This drop causes the uterus to lose its lining in menstruation; it is around this time that the lowest levels of estrogen are reached.

In an ovulatory menstrual cycle, the ovarian and uterine cycles are concurrent and coordinated and last between 21 and 35 days, with a population average of 27–29 days. The average length of the human menstrual cycle is similar to that of the lunar cycle. Some studies have suggested that the menstrual cycle is synchronized with the lunar cycle, though the mainstream view is that they are unrelated.

==== Follicular phase ====
The ovaries contain a finite number of immature egg cells, and granulosa cells, which together form primordial follicles. When the follicle matures into a secondary follicle, theca cells enter from the surrounding tissue. At around 20 weeks into gestation some 7 million immature eggs have already formed in an ovary. This decreases to around 2 million by the time a girl is born, and 300,000 by the time she has her first period. On average, one egg matures and is released during ovulation each month after menarche. These mature to primary follicles independently of the menstrual cycle. The development of the egg is called oogenesis and only one cell survives the divisions to await fertilization. The other cells are discarded as polar bodies, which cannot be fertilized. The follicular phase is the first part of the ovarian cycle and it ends with the completion of the antral follicles and ovulation. Meiosis (cell division) remains incomplete in the egg cells until just before ovulation, triggered by the LH surge, which creates the secondary oocyte and the first polar body. The cell then immediately arrests again in metaphase II of meiosis II and only completes meiosis entirely if and when it is fertilised by a sperm. During this phase usually only one ovarian follicle fully matures and gets ready to release an egg. The follicular phase shortens significantly with age, lasting around 14 days in women aged 18–24 compared with 10 days in women aged 40–44.

Through the influence of a rise in follicle stimulating hormone (FSH) during the first days of the cycle, a few ovarian follicles are stimulated. These follicles, which have been developing for the better part of a year in a process known as folliculogenesis, compete with each other for dominance. All but one of these follicles will stop growing, while one dominant follicle – the one that has the most FSH receptors – will continue to maturity. The remaining follicles die in a process called follicular atresia. Luteinizing hormone (LH) stimulates further development of the ovarian follicle. The follicle that reaches maturity is called an antral follicle, and it contains the ovum (egg cell).

The theca cells develop receptors that bind LH, and in response secrete large amounts of androstenedione. At the same time, the granulosa cells surrounding the maturing oocyte develop receptors that bind FSH. The granulosa cells take up this androstenedione, which is then converted to estrogen by their internal enzyme, aromatase. The estrogen inhibits further production of FSH and LH by the pituitary gland. This negative feedback regulates levels of FSH and LH. The dominant follicle continues to secrete estrogen, and the rising estrogen levels make the pituitary more responsive to GnRH from the hypothalamus. As estrogen increases this becomes a positive feedback signal, which makes the pituitary secrete more FSH and LH. This surge of FSH and LH usually occurs one to two days before ovulation and is responsible for stimulating the rupture of the antral follicle and release of the oocyte.

==== Ovulation ====
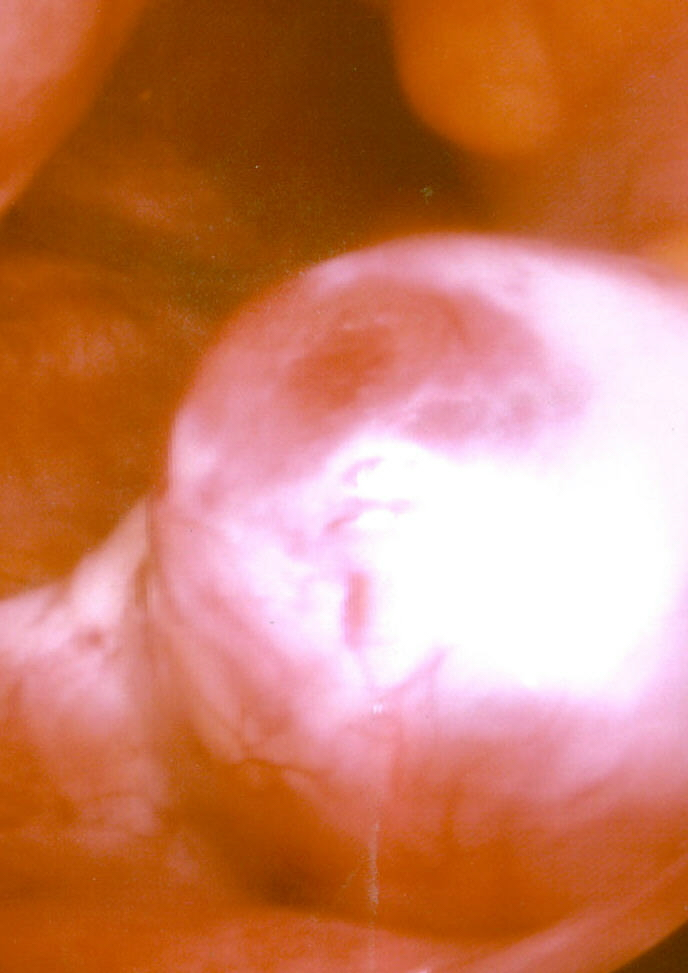
An ovary about to release an egg

Around day fourteen, the egg is released from the ovary. Called ovulation, this occurs when a mature egg is released from the ovarian follicles into the pelvic cavity and enters the fallopian tube, about 10–12 hours after the peak in LH surge. Typically only one of the 15–20 stimulated follicles reaches full maturity, and just one egg is released. Ovulation only occurs in around 10% of cycles during the first two years following menarche, and by the age of 40–50, the number of ovarian follicles is depleted. LH initiates ovulation at around day 14 and stimulates the formation of the corpus luteum. Following further stimulation by LH, the corpus luteum produces and releases estrogen, progesterone, relaxin (which relaxes the uterus by inhibiting contractions of the myometrium), and inhibin (which inhibits further secretion of FSH).

The release of LH matures the egg and weakens the follicle wall in the ovary, causing the fully developed follicle to release its oocyte. If it is fertilized by a sperm, the oocyte promptly matures into an ootid, which blocks the other sperm cells and becomes a mature egg. If it is not fertilized by a sperm, the oocyte degenerates. The mature egg has a diameter of about 0.1 mm (0.0039 in), and is the largest human cell.

Which of the two ovaries – left or right – ovulates appears random; no left and right coordinating process is known. Occasionally both ovaries release an egg; if both eggs are fertilized, the result is fraternal twins. After release from the ovary into the pelvic cavity, the egg is swept into the fallopian tube by the fimbria – a fringe of tissue at the end of each fallopian tube. After about a day, an unfertilized egg disintegrates or dissolves in the fallopian tube, and a fertilized egg reaches the uterus in three to five days.

Fertilization usually takes place in the ampulla, the widest section of the fallopian tubes. A fertilized egg immediately starts the process of embryonic development. The developing embryo takes about three days to reach the uterus, and another three days to implant into the endometrium. It has reached the blastocyst stage at the time of implantation: this is when pregnancy begins. The loss of the corpus luteum is prevented by fertilization of the egg. The syncytiotrophoblast (the outer layer of the resulting embryo-containing blastocyst that later becomes the outer layer of the placenta) produces human chorionic gonadotropin (hCG), which is very similar to LH and preserves the corpus luteum. During the first few months of pregnancy, the corpus luteum continues to secrete progesterone and estrogens at slightly higher levels than those at ovulation. After this and for the rest of the pregnancy, the placenta secretes high levels of these hormones – along with hCG, which stimulates the corpus luteum to secrete more progesterone and estrogens, blocking the menstrual cycle. These hormones also prepare the mammary glands for milk (Note: Breastfeeding women can experience complete suppression of follicular development, follicular development but no ovulation, or resumption of normal menstrual cycles.) production.

==== Luteal phase ====
Lasting about 14 days, the luteal phase is the final phase of the ovarian cycle and it corresponds to the secretory phase of the uterine cycle. During the luteal phase, the pituitary hormones FSH and LH cause the remaining parts of the dominant follicle to transform into the corpus luteum, which produces progesterone. (Note: In the corpus luteum, cholesterol side-chain cleavage enzyme converts cholesterol to pregnenolone, which is converted to progesterone.) The increased progesterone starts to induce the production of estrogen. The hormones produced by the corpus luteum also suppress production of the FSH and LH that the corpus luteum needs to maintain itself. The level of FSH and LH fall quickly, and the corpus luteum atrophies. Falling levels of progesterone trigger menstruation and the beginning of the next cycle. For an individual woman, the follicular phase often varies in length from cycle to cycle; by contrast, the length of her luteal phase will be fairly consistent from cycle to cycle at 10 to 16 days (average 14 days).

=== Uterine cycle ===
The anatomy of the uterus

The uterine cycle has three phases: menses, proliferative and secretory.

==== Menstruation ====
Menstruation (also called menstrual bleeding, menses or a period) is the first and most evident phase of the uterine cycle and first occurs at puberty. Called menarche, the first period occurs at the age of around twelve or thirteen years. The average age is generally later in the developing world and earlier in the developed world. In precocious puberty, it can occur as early as age eight years, and this can still be normal.

Menstruation is initiated each month by falling levels of estrogen and progesterone and the release of prostaglandins, which constrict the spiral arteries. This causes them to spasm, contract and break up. The blood supply to the endometrium is cut off and the cells of the top layer of the endometrium (the stratum functionalis) become deprived of oxygen and die. Later the whole layer is lost and only the bottom layer, the stratum basalis, is left in place. An enzyme called plasmin breaks up the blood clots in the menstrual fluid, which eases the flow of blood and broken down lining from the uterus. The flow of blood continues for 2–6 days and around 30–60 milliliters of blood is lost, and is a sign that pregnancy has not occurred.

The flow of blood normally serves as a sign that a woman has not become pregnant, but this cannot be taken as certainty, as several factors can cause bleeding during pregnancy. Menstruation occurs on average once a month from menarche to menopause, which corresponds with a woman's fertile years. The average age of menopause in women is 52 years, and it typically occurs between 45 and 55 years of age. Menopause is preceded by a stage of hormonal changes called perimenopause.

Eumenorrhea denotes normal, regular menstruation that lasts for around the first five days of the cycle. Women who experience menorrhagia (heavy menstrual bleeding) are more susceptible to iron deficiency than the average person.

==== Proliferative phase ====
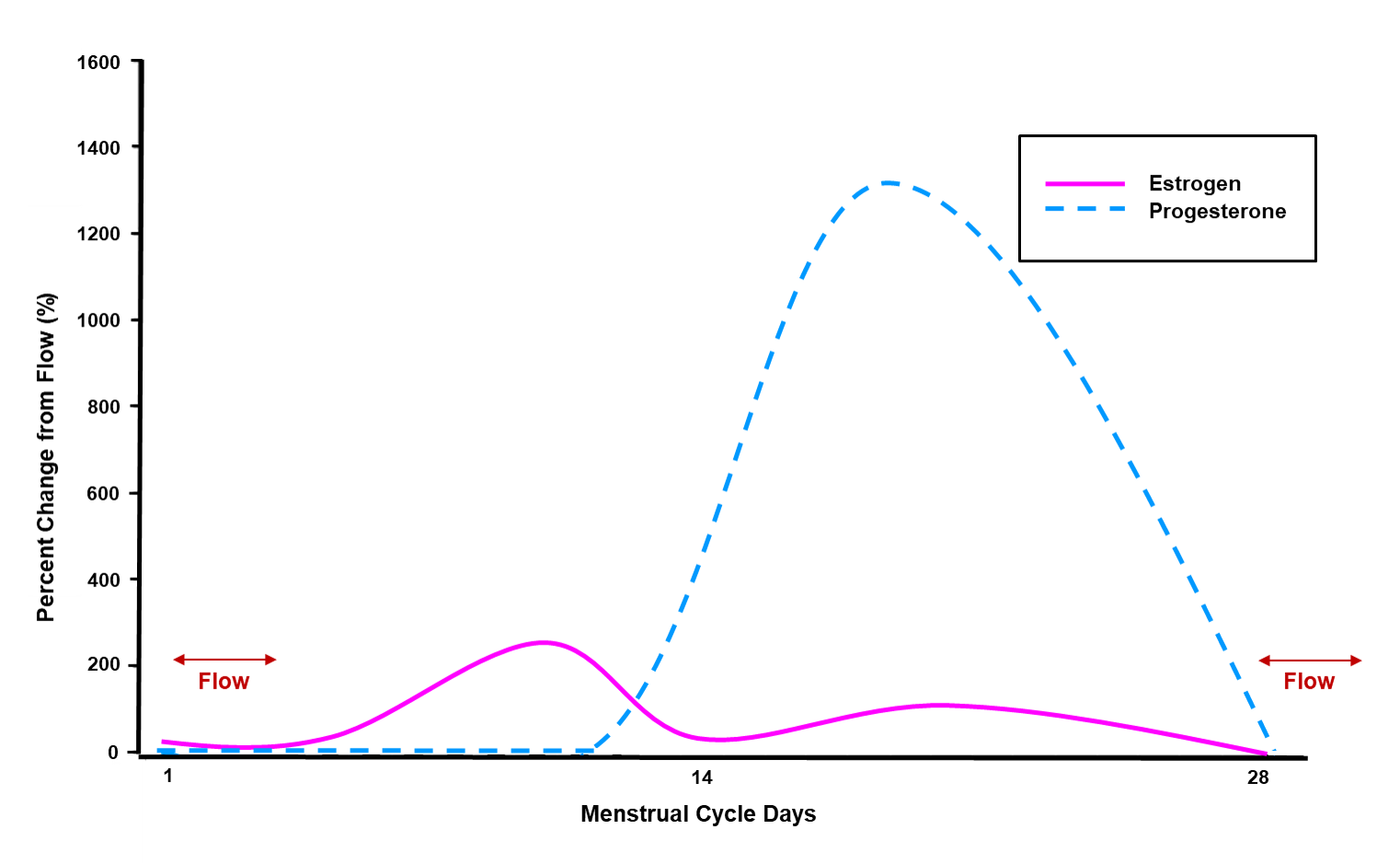
During the menstrual cycle, levels of estradiol (an estrogen) vary by 200 percent. Levels of progesterone vary by over 1200 percent.

The proliferative phase is the second phase of the uterine cycle when estrogen causes the lining of the uterus to grow and proliferate. The latter part of the follicular phase overlaps with the proliferative phase of the uterine cycle. As they mature, the ovarian follicles secrete increasing amounts of estradiol, an estrogen. The estrogens initiate the formation of a new layer of endometrium in the uterus with the spiral arterioles.

As estrogen levels increase, cells in the cervix produce a type of cervical mucus that has a higher pH and is less viscous than usual, rendering it more hospitable to sperm. This increases the chances of fertilization, which occurs around day 11 to day 14. This cervical mucus can be detected as a vaginal discharge that is copious and resembles raw egg whites. For women who are practicing fertility awareness, it is a sign that ovulation may be about to take place, but it does not mean ovulation will definitely occur.

The microstructure of the uterus lining changes throughout the cycle.

==== Secretory phase ====
The secretory phase is the final phase of the uterine cycle and it corresponds to the luteal phase of the ovarian cycle. During the secretory phase, the corpus luteum produces progesterone, which plays a vital role in making the endometrium receptive to the implantation of a blastocyst (a fertilized egg, which has begun to grow). Glycogen, lipids, and proteins are secreted into the uterus and the cervical mucus thickens. In early pregnancy, progesterone also increases blood flow and reduces the contractility of the smooth muscle in the uterus and raises basal body temperature.

If pregnancy does not occur the ovarian and uterine cycles start over again.

== Anovulatory cycles and short luteal phases ==
Only two-thirds of overtly normal menstrual cycles are ovulatory, that is, cycles in which ovulation occurs. The other third lack ovulation or have a short luteal phase (less than ten days) in which progesterone production is insufficient for normal physiology and fertility. Cycles in which ovulation does not occur (anovulation) are common in girls who have just begun menstruating and in women around menopause. During the first two years following menarche, ovulation is absent in around half of cycles. Five years after menarche, ovulation occurs in around 75% of cycles and this reaches 80% in the following years. Anovulatory cycles are often overtly identical to normally ovulatory cycles. Any alteration to balance of hormones can lead to anovulation. Stress, anxiety and eating disorders can cause a fall in GnRH, and a disruption of the menstrual cycle. Chronic anovulation occurs in 6–15% of women during their reproductive years. Around menopause, hormone feedback dysregulation leads to anovulatory cycles. Although anovulation is not considered a disease, it can be a sign of an underlying condition such as polyendocrine metabolic ovarian syndrome. Anovulatory cycles or short luteal phases are normal when women are under stress or athletes increasing the intensity of training. These changes are reversible as the stressors decrease or, in the case of the athlete, as she adapts to the training.

== Menstrual health ==
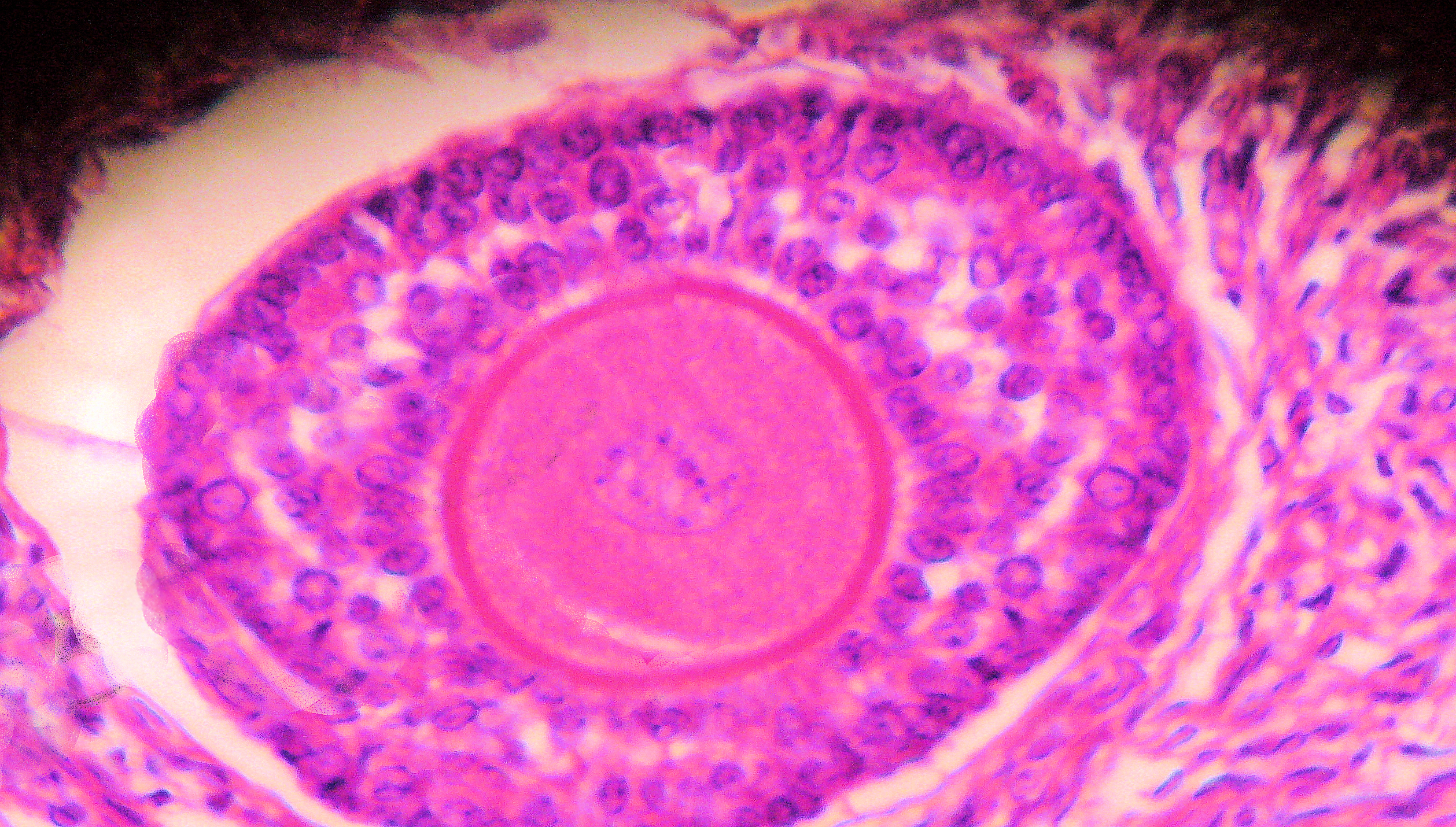
A human primary ovarian follicle viewed by microscopy. The round oocyte stained red in the center is surrounded by a layer of granulosa cells, which are enveloped by the basement membrane and theca cells. The magnification is around 1000 times. (H&E stain)

Although a normal and natural process, some women experience premenstrual syndrome with symptoms that may include acne, tender breasts, and tiredness. More severe symptoms that affect daily living are classed as premenstrual dysphoric disorder and are experienced by 3 to 8% of women. Dysmenorrhea (menstrual cramps or period pain) is felt as painful cramps in the abdomen that can spread to the back and upper thighs during the first few days of menstruation. Debilitating period pain is not normal and can be a sign of something severe such as endometriosis. These issues can significantly affect a woman's health and quality of life and timely interventions can improve the lives of these women.

There are common culturally communicated misbeliefs that the menstrual cycle affects women's moods, causes depression or irritability, or that menstruation is a painful, shameful or unclean experience. Often a woman's normal mood variation is falsely attributed to the menstrual cycle. Much of the research is weak, but there appears to be a very small increase in mood fluctuations during the luteal and menstrual phases, and a corresponding decrease during the rest of the cycle. Changing levels of estrogen and progesterone across the menstrual cycle exert systemic effects on aspects of physiology including the brain, metabolism, and musculoskeletal system. The result can be subtle physiological and observable changes to women's athletic performance including strength, aerobic, and anaerobic performance.

Changes to the brain have also been observed throughout the menstrual cycle but do not translate into measurable changes in intellectual achievement – including academic performance, problem-solving, and memory. Improvements in spatial reasoning ability during the menstruation phase of the cycle are probably caused by decreases in levels of estrogen and progesterone.

In some women, ovulation features a characteristic pain (Note: Uncharacteristic mid-cycle pain may be caused by medical conditions such as ectopic pregnancy or ruptured ovarian cyst or may be confused with appendicitis.) called mittelschmerz (a German term meaning middle pain). The cause of the pain is associated with the ruptured follicle, causing a small amount of blood loss.

Even when normal, the changes in hormone levels during the menstrual cycle can increase the incidence of disorders such as autoimmune diseases, which might be caused by estrogen enhancement of the immune system.

Around 40% of women with epilepsy find that their seizures occur more frequently at certain phases of their menstrual cycle. This catamenial epilepsy may be due to a drop in progesterone if it occurs during the luteal phase or around menstruation, or a surge in estrogen if it occurs at ovulation. Women who have regular periods can take medication just before and during menstruation. Options include progesterone supplements, increasing the dose of their regular anticonvulsant drug, or temporarily adding an anticonvulsant such as clobazam or acetazolamide. If this is ineffective, or when a woman's menstrual cycle is irregular, then treatment is to stop the menstrual cycle occurring. This may be achieved using medroxyprogesterone, triptorelin or goserelin, or by sustained use of oral contraceptives.

=== Hormonal contraception ===
Hormonal contraceptives prevent pregnancy by inhibiting the secretion of the hormones, FSH, LH and GnRH. Hormonal contraception that contains estrogen, such as combined oral contraceptive pills (COCPs), stop the development of the dominant follicle and the mid-cycle LH surge and thus ovulation. Sequential dosing and discontinuation of the COCP can mimic the uterine cycle and produce bleeding that resembles a period. In some cases, this bleeding is lighter.

Progestin-only methods of hormonal contraception do not always prevent ovulation but instead work by stopping the cervical mucus from becoming sperm-friendly. Hormonal contraception is available in a variety of forms such as pills, patches, skin implants and hormonal intrauterine devices (IUDs).

== Evolution and other species ==
Most female mammals have an estrous cycle, but only ten primate species, four bat species, the elephant shrews and the Cairo spiny mouse (Acomys cahirinus) have a menstrual cycle. The cycles are the same as in humans apart from the length, which ranges from 9 to 37 days. The lack of immediate relationship between these groups suggests that four distinct evolutionary events have caused menstruation to arise. There are four theories on the evolutionary significance of menstruation:

1. Control of sperm-borne pathogens. This hypothesis held that menstruation protected the uterus against pathogens introduced by sperm. This hypothesis does not take into account that copulation can take place weeks before menstruation and that potentially infectious semen is not controlled by menstruation in other species.
2. Energy conservation. This hypothesis claimed that it took less energy to rebuild a uterine lining than to maintain it if pregnancy did not occur. This hypothesis does not explain other species that also do not maintain a uterine lining but do not menstruate.
3. A theory based on spontaneous decidualization (a process that results in significant changes to cells of the endometrium in preparation for, and during, pregnancy). Decidualization leads to the differentiation of the endometrial stroma, which involves cells of the immune system, the formation of a new blood supply, hormones and tissue differentiation. In non-menstruating mammals, decidualization is driven by the embryo, not the mother. According to this theory, menstruation is an unintended consequence of the decidualization process and the body uses spontaneous decidualization to identify and reject defective embryos early on. This process happens because the decidual cells of the stroma can recognize and respond to defects in a developing embryo by stopping the secretion of cytokines needed for the embryo to implant.
4. Uterine pre-conditioning. This hypothesis claims that a monthly pre-conditioning of the uterus is needed in species, such as humans, that have deeply invasive (deep-rooted) placentas. In the process leading to the formation of a placenta, maternal tissues are invaded. This hypothesis holds that menstruation was not evolutionary, rather the result of a coincidental pre-conditioning of the uterus to protect uterine tissue from the deeply rooting placenta, in which a thicker endometrium develops. This hypothesis does not explain menstruation in non-primates.
