= Ovarian follicle activation =

Follicles moving from inactive to growing phase

Ovarian follicle activation can be defined as primordial follicles in the ovary moving from a quiescent (inactive) to a growing phase. The primordial follicle in the ovary is what makes up the "pool" of follicles that will be induced to enter growth and developmental changes that change them into pre-ovulatory follicles, ready to be released during ovulation. The process of development from a primordial follicle to a pre-ovulatory follicle is called folliculogenesis.

Activation of the primordial follicle involves the following: a morphological change from flattened follicular cells to cuboidal granulosa cells, proliferation of granulosa cells to form the membrana granulosa, formation of the protective zona pellucida layer, and growth of the oocyte.

It is widely understood that androgens act primarily on preantral follicles and that this activity is important for preantral follicle growth. Additionally, it is thought that androgens are involved in primordial follicle activation. However, the influence of androgens on primordial follicle recruitment and whether this response is primary or secondary is still uncertain.

== Primordial follicle activation ==
Primordial follicles are activated to develop further. Communication between the oocytes and the surrounding somatic granulosa cells, is involved in the control of primordial follicle activation. There are various activator signalling pathways that are involved in the control of ovarian follicle activation, including: Neurotropin, nerve growth factor (NGF) and its tyrosine receptor kinase (NTRK1), neurotrophin-4 (NT-4), brain-derived neurotrophic factor (BDNF) and their receptor NTRK2. Additional ligands have a role in facilitating primordial follicle activation such as transforming growth factor beta (TGF-B), growth differentiation factor 9 (GDF-9) and bone morphogenetic protein 15 (BMP-15).

=== GDF9 ===
The follicular activation rate is increased in experiments where recombinant GDF9 is added. Additionally, the in vitro addition of GDF9 to human ovarian cortical tissue causes enhanced activation and follicular survival. Removing GDF9 from mice, through knock-out experiments, halts follicle progression beyond the first stage, and prevents granulosa cell proliferation. However, these GDF9 null mice have accelerated oocyte growth, suggesting that GDF9 is partially responsible for granulosa cell recruitment, as well as inhibiting oocyte growth. GDF9 promotes follicular survival and growth as a result of dampened granulosa apoptosis and follicular atresia.

=== TGF-β ===
TGF-β ligands, for example BMP4 and 7 have a role in follicular activation. SMADs are downstream molecules of the TGF-β signalling pathway, hence rely on TGF-β for activation. In the absence of SMADs, mice have decreased folliculogenesis, with decreased quantities of primordial follicles, as well as developed adult follicles at both developmental stages. BMP15 has been shown to stimulate granulosa cell growth by encouraging the proliferation of undifferentiated granulosa cells. This is not dependent on FSH. It was shown that two proliferation markers, Ki-67 and proliferating cell nuclear antigen (PCNA), are regulated by these factors. Additionally, PCNA has been suggested to act as a key regulator of ovarian follicle development. The temporal expression of PCNA in oocytes is coincident with the start of primordial follicle formation. PCNA promotes apoptosis of oocytes, which regulates primordial follicle assembly.

=== Foxl2 ===
Another molecule that has been implicated in the activation of oocyte follicles is Forkhead box protein L2 (Foxl2). In knock out studies, it has been shown that Foxl2 may be responsible for the cuboidal transition of the pre-granulosa cells. Hence, when Foxl2 is removed, the primordial follicles are unable to develop into secondary follicles.

=== SOHLH1 ===
Spermatogenesis-and-oogenesis-specific basic helix-loop-helix containing protein 1 (SOHLH1) is expressed within germ cell clusters and in new primordial follicles. Knock out studies of this protein in mice show a reduced number of oocytes present at 7 weeks post birth and a malfunction in the transition from primordial to primary follicle.

== Repression of activation ==
=== PTEN ===
Phosphatase and tensin homolog (PTEN) is a tumour suppressor gene whose actions directly affect the activation of primordial follicles. It does this by negatively controlling the PI3K/AKT/mTOR pathway. This particular action of PTEN was initially discovered in an experiment using PTEN knockout mice. The absence of PTEN within the primordial follicles lead to an increase in AKT phosphorylation. This then creates a subsequent rise in FOXO3 export, as AKT is no longer inhibiting its production. This led to over-activation of the primordial follicles, which resulted in a premature decline of the primordial follicle pool.

=== Foxo3 ===
When Foxo3 is KO in mice models a huge uncontrolled activation of follicles is seen thus the mouse ovaries are deficient of the entire pool of primordial follicles because they have been prematurely activated. This action is regulated by phosphorylation, the unphosphorylated form is transcriptionally active in the nucleus. However, when phosphorylation occurs the protein is transported to the cytoplasm and loses its transcriptional activity. Pelosi et al. noted that the timing and level of the Foxo3 expression is very important to regulate ovarian follicle activation.

AKt- PTEN-AKt and Foxo3 are all involved in the same pathway. PTEN is situated upstream of AKt. Therefore, if PTEN is deleted specifically from an oocyte this causes an increase in AKt activity resulting in large numbers of dormant ovarian follicles resuming their growth and differentiation. The TSC complex also plays an important role in this pathways by suppressing the activity of mTOR which has been proven to be essential for maintaining dormancy.

=== TSC and mTOR ===
Tuberin/tuberous sclerosis complex is also thought to be important in the regulation of primordial follicle activation. TSC negatively controls the function of mTOR (mammalian target of rapamycin). TSC knockout mice have a raised level of mTORC1 activity. Suppressing mTORC1 is a necessary process to prevent primordial follicles from being prematurely activated and therefore premature ovarian insufficiency.

=== AMH ===
Anti-Müllerian hormone (AMH) is a member of the transforming growth factor beta (TGF-b), that has a very important role in regulating both testicular and ovarian function. In the first instance AMH inhibits the initial enrollment of the resting primordial follicles. Secondly AMH prevents the regulation of preantral/small antral follicle growth by reducing their responsiveness to FSH.

=== Cyclin-dependent kinase inhibitor p27 ===
P27 inhibits cell cycle progression at the G1 phase by preventing the action of cyclin E-Cdk2. Due to its important role in the cell cycle, it is found within the nucleus of mice oocytes in primordial and primary follicles. During puberty of p27 knock out mice, all primordial follicles are activated and leads to POF. This indicates that p27 is a vital regulator in maintaining a quiescent state in primordial follicles.

== Clinical significance ==
=== Premature ovarian failure ===
Premature ovarian failure (POF), or premature ovarian insufficiency (POI), is a female reproductive disorder characterised by at least 4 months of primary or secondary amenorrhea, before the age of 40. It is caused by either a decrease in the primordial follicle pool, accelerated atresia of follicles or altered maturation or recruitment of primordial follicles and is associated with menopausal levels of follicle stimulating hormones, exceeding 40 Ul/L.^{,} Specific activator and suppressor genes are implicated in ovarian follicle activation and recent research suggests that POF may be the consequence of a genetic mutation in one or more of these genes.

FOXL2 - FOXL2 knockout mouse models showed failure of granulosa cell differentiation, which led to the premature activation and depletion of primordial follicles, characteristic of POF. Two different variations of mutations in the FOXL2 gene, which cause different forms of POF, one with earlier onset and the other with later onset and incomplete penetrance, have been identified. Additionally, mutations in the FOXL2 gene have been found in approximately 5% of nonsyndromic POF patients, which suggests that FOXL2 mutations are also associated with idiopathic POF.

BMP15 and GDF9 - Mutations in BMP15 and GDF9 genes can be involved in POF, but are not major causes of the disease. For example, low GDF9 mutation frequency has been found in a large cohort of Indian cases of POF.

SOHLH1 - Little is known about the causative association of SOHLH1 and POF, however three novel SOHLH1 variants have been found to potentially cause the disease and when studied, they were absent in controls.

AMH - A decrease in AMH expression in POF antral follicles leads to defective antral development.

mTORC1 and PI3K - Deregulation of mTORC1 and PI3K signaling pathways in oocytes results in ovarian pathological conditions, including POF and subsequent infertility.

PTEN - Studies of mice with a deletion in PTEN in the oocytes showed early activation of the entire pool of primordial follicles, leading to a lack of primordial follicles in adulthood, resulting in a POF phenotype.

Foxo3a - Studies into mice with complete and partial Foxo3a deletions also showed premature activation of the entire primordial follicle pool, destroying the ovarian reserve and leading to oocyte death. This led to a POF phenotype, seen in studies in a range of countries.^{,}

TSC - In the oocytes of Tsc2 knockout mice, elevated mTORC1 activity causes the pool of primordial follicles to become activated prematurely. This results in follicle depletion in early adulthood, causing POF.

=== Chemotherapy ===
As well as having many genetic causes, premature ovarian failure has been shown to be a side effect of chemotherapy. The damage suffered by ovaries appears to be dose-dependent, and a class of chemotherapy drugs known as alkylating agents, seem to cause the most damage to the ovary and follicles. There are two ways in which this damage occurs:

1. By direct damage to the primordial follicle, causing cell death by toxicity
2. By indirect damage to the stromal cells which surround the follicle and support it, to allow it to grow. Loss of these supporting cells then leads to death of the follicle.

Chemotherapeutic agents, such as Cyclophosphamide, have been shown to activate the PI3K/PTEN/Akr pathway, which is the main pathway involved in keeping the follicles dormant and permitting them to grow - activation of this pathway encourages more primordial follicles to grow and develop. These growing follicles may then be destroyed in subsequent rounds of chemotherapy, which often target growing cells, which will then cause more primordial follicles to differentiate and grow to replace the destroyed cells. This concept, known as burnout, leads to a depletion of the ovarian reserve and results in premature ovarian failure.

=== Oocyte cryopreservation ===
Oocyte cryopreservation is a preservative process which can be used as a way of preserving fertility in children treated for childhood or adolescent cancer, and to avoid the damage to the ovaries caused by cytotoxic drugs often used in chemotherapy. There are several methods of cryopreservation, each with different levels of effectiveness. After cryopreservation, the ovarian tissue must be placed back into the patient, in order to allow the ovary to function normally again and regain fertility.

=== Restoration after cryopreservation ===
Restoration of the ovarian function occurs in almost all cases of cryopreservation, but it takes a while for the ovarian follicles to regain full function. In all cases of successful function restoration, it took 3.5-6.5 months after reimplantation before a rise in oestrogen, a key hormone produced by the ovary, and a decrease in follicle stimulating hormone (FSH) were detected. The variation in time difference may be due to differences in the follicular reserves in the women at the time of cryopreservation.

== Inducing follicle activation ==
In vitro follicle activation describes the process by which primordial follicles are deliberately activated. Oocytes from these activated follicles can be used to establish a pregnancy. This has potential for widespread use in restoring fertility in women suffering with fertility issues such as early or medically induced menopause.

=== Medical applications of inducing ovarian follicle growth ===
==== Poor ovarian reserve ====
Conventional IVA or drug free IVA can be used to preserve fertility in patients with either poor ovarian reserve or premature ovarian insufficiency.

Drug free IVA is more beneficial in both instances with recent menses cessation than conventional IVA. This is because it reduces the invasiveness of surgical approaches and circumvents adverse effects of tissue culture on follicles. Traditional IVA is recommended in patients with poor ovarian reserve like in patients with POI with prolonged menopause or patients looking for immediate outcomes.

Using drug free IVA, at least 18 healthy live births and three more ongoing pregnancies in both cases charted in papers, with additional unpublished deliveries and ongoing pregnancies reported in scientific conferences.

==== Resistant ovary syndrome ====
Patients with resistant ovary syndrome (ROS) are a subgroup of patients with POI who have multiple antral follicles present in the ovary as shown by ultrasound monitoring. These follicles secrete low levels of oestrogen but are resistant to exogenous follicle stimulating hormone treatment so cannot develop to maturity.

Like patients with POI, ROS patients can respond to incision of the ovarian cortex to cause Hippo signalling disruption. Additionally, laparoscopic ovarian incision (LOI) can be performed in vivo to successfully promote follicle growth without removing tissue outside of the body.

==== Post-cancer treatment ====
Oocyte cryopreservation is widely used to protect primordial follicles from gonadotoxic treatment but some patients are not eligible for this, IVA could be a beneficial option for fertility preservation in cancer patients. The IVA approach could maximise the number of secondary oocytes in infertile woman since transplanting ovarian tissue successfully activates the dormant follicle pool.

The IVA method focuses on the short-term goal of generating a large number of activated follicles immediately following transplantation of tissue back into the body. This means that the IVA method has a reduced graft lifespan compared to the 4–5 years that can be offered in the cryopreservation method. The graft lifespan relates to the length of time following transplantation back into the body that pregnancies can occur within. This is because IVA promotes loss of dormant follicles to activation so fewer dormant follicles will remain in the graft. This, as a result, reduces graft lifespan. However, this can be beneficial in patients looking for immediate outcomes or to improve her chance of conceiving as fast as possible due to advancing age.

So far, there have been no reported live births but progress is being made in in-vitro research.

=== Surgically removing ovaries ===
Patients are usually treated with synthetic oestrogen and progesterone for at least a month in order to suppress their gonadotrophin levels which has been shown to promote ovulation. A laparoscopic approach is used to remove the ovary. The outer part of the ovary (the cortex) is removed using scissors as this minimises any damage to the sensitive inner ovarian tissue. This tissue is then analysed to assess the presence of existing follicles before further manipulation.

==== Artificial ovaries ====
Artificial ovaries can be used to provide follicles for artificial activation. Follicles from these synthetic ovaries have been shown to support successful pregnancies in mouse models and show promise for potential for future treatments in humans.

=== Ovarian fragmentation and hippo signalling disruption ===
The Hippo signalling pathway is an essential pathway involving several components that regulate cell growth, survival and stem cell renewal. For this reason, the Hippo signalling pathway has been implicated in the maintenance and control of organ size in organisms.

In recent years, ovarian fragmentation has surfaced as an effective strategy to promote ovarian follicular activation and growth. Studies undertaken on cultured human ovarian cortical fragments have demonstrated that the mechanical damage resulting from ovarian tissue fragmentation disrupts the Hippo signalling pathway. This has been found to accelerate follicle activation. Mechanical damage to the ovaries through fragmentation have been found to induce a transient elevation in actin polymerisation - a process where small actin molecules (proteins) combine to form a large, chain-like structure with repeating actin units. Mechanical damage to the ovaries has also decreased phosphorylation of Yes-associated protein (YAP), an essential compound in the Hippo Signalling pathway. Phosphorylation refers to the addition of phosphate groups to molecules. Consequently, this leads to an increase in the levels of YAP in the nucleus. This in turn triggers a downstream ripple effect to increase the expression of growth factors and apoptosis inhibitors, therefore promoting cell growth and survival.

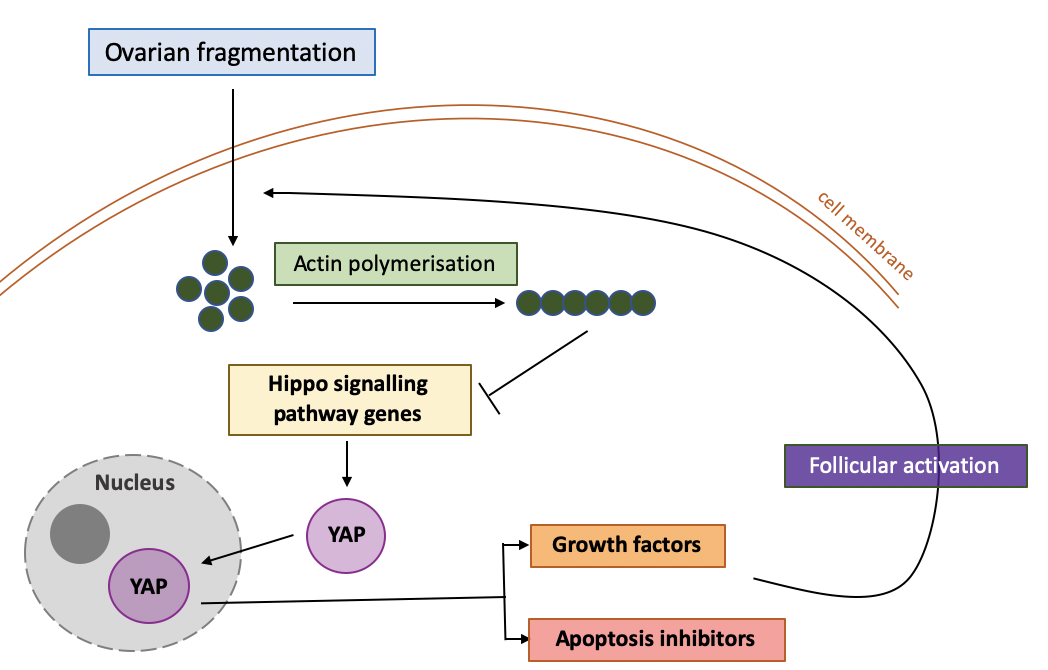
Ovarian fragmentation and hippo signalling pathway

=== PI3K/AKT/MTOR signalling pathway activation ===
Another key pathway in ovarian follicle activation is the PI3K-PTEN-AKT-FOXO3 pathway.

The PI3K-PTEN-AKT-FOXO3 pathway is a complex signal transduction pathway involving a cascade of several molecules. This pathway is involved in promoting growth, survival and proliferation of cells in response to certain factors. The pathway is therefore implicated in the activation of ovarian primordial follicles. In in vitro activation of ovarian follicles, drugs such as inhibitors of PTEN or activators of PI3K can be administered to stimulate follicle activation.

=== In vitro activation ===
Stimulation of the Atk pathway activates dormant primordial follicles. The hippo signalling pathway regulates growth by inhibiting cell proliferation and promoting apoptosis, disrupting this pathway stimulates cell growth and proliferation. In vitro activation (IVA) consists of the combination of disrupting the hippo signalling pathway and stimulation of Akt signalling to activate ovarian follicle growth and maturation. Atk pathway activation can be artificially induced by Atk stimulating drugs such as PTEN inhibitors and PI3K activators and hippo signalling disruption is achieved through fragmentation of ovarian cortex via various methods. Growth of follicles can be seen in subsequent autografts, mature eggs can be retrieved and IVF carried out making it a good candidate for fertility preservation. Drug free IVA may alternatively be used. This is the same as IVA however no drugs are used to stimulate the Atk pathway, only ovarian cortex fragmentation is used.
