= Artificial ovary =

Fertility preservation treatment

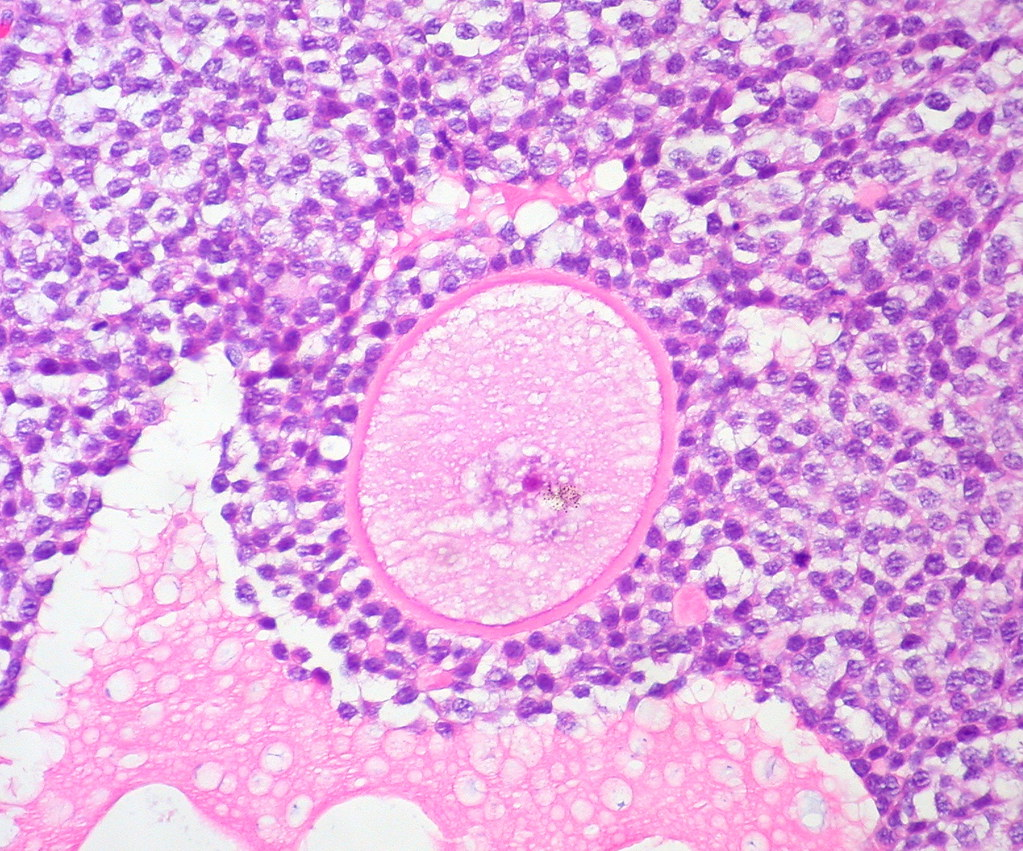
Graafian follicle of the human ovary

An artificial ovary is a potential fertility preservation treatment that aims to mimic the function of the natural ovary.

Conventional fertility preservation for females involves oocyte cryopreservation or ovarian tissue cryopreservation. However, there are drawbacks to these treatments. Oocyte cryopreservation is not possible for those with pre-pubertal cancer or premature ovarian insufficiency. Ovarian tissue cryopreservation also poses a risk of reintroducing malignant cells after cancer recovery, particular in those with previous leukaemia.

Artificial ovaries could be an effective alternative in fertility preservation. The artificial ovary aims to replicate its natural counterpart by producing oocytes and releasing steroid hormones. To date, no human oocytes have been fertilised or used to produce offspring using an artificial ovary and it is unlikely that this will occur until further research has been completed and bioethical concerns have been considered.

Ideally, the artificial ovary should contain follicles or oocytes obtained from ovarian tissue cryopreservation, as well as other ovarian cells to provide growth factors. Isolated follicles are then transplanted (either at the normal site of the ovary or elsewhere in the body) in a delivery scaffold. An ideal biocompatible scaffold would cause minimal inflammation, be suitable for neo-angiogenesis, and degrade after transplantation.

There are some limitations to artificial ovaries. From an ethical perspective, there is the issue of justice of who would qualify to receive artificial ovaries (except in autologous transplant) as there is limited availability. There is also a bioethical concerns around pre-implantation diagnosis and genetic manipulation of artificial ovaries. If a patient's own ovarian tissue is used for generating artificial ovaries, the risk of reintroducing malignancy is still present, although this risk would be lowered if only oocytes were used.

One area of future research in this field will look at the source of oocytes for artificial ovaries. There is potential for induced pluripotent stem cells (iPSCs) to be used as an alternative source to a patient's own gametes. Although this has not yet been tested with human stem cells, mice transplanted with these cells were able to successfully reproduce through in vitro maturation and fertilisation. However, human iPSCs are known to have mitochondrial DNA mutations even when isolated from healthy donors, therefore there is still more work to be done with this area.

== How they are made ==
The ovarian tissue will undergo sequential culture steps to (hopefully) produce fertilisable mature oocytes:

1. Culture the cortical ovarian tissue to enhance primordial follicle (immature follicle) growth and isolate the primordial and primary follicles
2. Culture the growing ovarian follicles within a 3D microenvironment
3. Isolate and culture the immature oocytes in an attempt to produce mature oocytes which are ready for IVF or cryopreservation

=== Culturing of cortical ovarian tissue and isolation of follicles ===
A common source of ovarian tissue used comes from tissue excised from the patient prior to cancer treatment, which is then cryopreserved. The tissue is then cultured to activate the primordial follicles and allow them to develop. To isolate the follicles, a combination of enzymatic and mechanical tissue digestion has shown to be the most effective method to yield a high quantity of follicles whilst maintaining their quality. The enzymes used, liberase DH and DNase, are produced by good manufacturing practice (GMP) to fully comply with GMP guidelines to ensure future application to patients. The enzymatic digestion process is inactivated every 30 minutes and the suspension is filtered to allow fully isolated follicles to be removed and reduce unnecessary enzyme exposure which may lead to damage of their basement membrane and their death.

When recovering the isolated follicles, malignant cells may be inadvertently retrieved, which poses the risk of re-introducing malignant cells into the patient. To minimise the risk of contamination, the isolated follicles undergo a washing step which involves rinsing the follicles with fresh dissecting media, three times, to separate them from surrounding isolated cells.

=== Culturing the growing follicles within a 3D microenvironment ===
The isolated follicles are then encapsulated within a 3D matrix and cultured for up to 4 weeks. The material used has to meet biosafety and clinically compatible standards, such as adequate protection and support of the follicles and adaptability to human body temperature, if artificial ovaries are to be transplanted into a patient. Potential materials are divided into synthetic polymers and natural polymers. Synthetic polymers tend to be more predictable than natural polymers in terms of their rate of degradation and their mechanical properties can be tailored to the specific clinical requirements. Although they contain no essential molecules for cell adhesion, bioactive factors can be incorporated to stimulate this. The only synthetic polymer utilised so far has been poly(ethylene glycol), which developed immature mouse follicles into antral follicles and corpora lutea.

Natural polymers have bioactive molecules which play a role in cell adhesion, migration, proliferation and differentiation. However, they lack mechanical strength and the adaptability that synthetic polymers have. Unlike synthetic polymers, there has been a success with a wider range of natural polymers: collagen, plasma clots, fibrin, alginate and decellularized ovarian tissue.

The microenvironment of the structure should mimic that of the natural ovary, so the artificial ovary should support the follicles structurally, but also cellularly. Ovarian stromal cells are integrated into the microenvironment as they play an important role in early development of the follicles. They release various factors which positively regulate the transition of primordial follicles to primary follicles, but also release other cells which will differentiate into theca cells; those that play a supportive role for growing follicles and produce sex steroids such as androstenedione and testosterone. This can be achieved by isolating them from a second fresh ovarian biopsy once the patient has completed their cancer treatment, thus avoiding potential contamination. Endothelial cells should also be co-transported as they are key to promoting angiogenesis of the artificial ovary.

=== Oocyte culture ===
The immature oocytes are retrieved from the artificial ovary and cultured in vitro for a further 24–48 hours, allowing them to mature oocytes which are ready for IVF or vitrification (cryopreservation).

== Mouse models ==
=== Initial experiments ===
The majority of knowledge we have about the artificial ovary has been discovered through the use of mouse models. Initial experiments in the 1990s were performed on mice that saw the grafting of preantral follicles onto an artificial ovary made with collagen. The preantral follicles were shown to undergo in vitro growth (IVG) therefore suggesting that a collagen matrix could be of good use for an artificial ovary. Despite the positive results, the growth was accompanied by atresia of antral follicles meaning that it was necessary to look for other alternatives to collagen that allowed follicle growth when the artificial ovary was implanted back into the mouse.

=== Natural matrices in the mouse model ===
Since then, a range of different natural matrices have been tested for their usefulness as an artificial ovary. Included in these are fibrin, alginate and decellularized human ovary which have shown in vitro maturation, ovary-like structure production and the production of offspring when transplanted into mice. In addition to these events being observed separately, the full process of development from the grafting of preantral follicles to the ovary through to the birth of live offspring has been demonstrated in the mouse model.

=== Synthetic matrices in the mouse model ===
In addition to these natural matrices a range of synthetic matrices have also been tested in mice. Synthetic matrices have the advantage that they can be made in bulk quantities and kept for a long time. However they do not contain biological factors needed for cell adhesion, therefore adding another layer of complexity to their creation. It is hoped that the knowledge we have gained using mouse models may one day be applied clinically, whether that be through the use of natural or synthetic matrices.

=== Restoration of puberty in mice ===
Not only have artificial ovaries shown the ability to restore fertility, they have further been linked to the complete restoration of hormone production leading to puberty. Transplantation of a human decellularized artificial ovary containing murine primary follicles has been shown to induce puberty in mice without oocytes by promoting oestradiol and inhibin B production. Mice were then shown to be able to produce viable offspring suggesting that artificial ovaries could be useful in women who have not undergone puberty.

== Human models ==
There could be many possible applications of human artificial ovaries.

=== In vitro matured oocytes in IVF and cryopreservation ===
One emerging application of human artificial ovaries would be the use of oocytes which have undergone in vitro maturation (IVM) in IVF or cryopreservation. Oocyte retrieval followed by IVM does not require hormonal stimulation and can be a quick procedure, therefore would be advantageous in fertility preservation of cancer patients – especially where chemotherapy must start as soon as possible.

=== Re-transplantation of ovarian follicles grown in vitro ===
Another possible clinical application of human artificial ovaries is re-transplanting ovarian follicles which have been grown in vitro. In animal models, pre-antral ovarian follicles have been grown in vitro, then isolated and implanted into a biodegradable 3D artificial ovary for re-transplantation back into the animal ovary. This method has shown potential success in animal models, but in humans remains a theoretical concept for now.

=== Re-transplantation of ovarian tissue activated in vitro ===
A third possible clinical application is the re-transplantation of in vitro activated ovarian tissue. This would enable ovarian tissue to be removed from a patient, activated in vitro and then auto-transplanted into the same patient. However, this treatment is not advised for patients who have cancers that may metastasise in the ovaries (e.g. leukaemia) or those with ovarian carcinomas, due to concerns that the cancer cells may be re-implanted back into the patient. Auto-transplantation of the activated ovarian tissue into the broad ligament of the uterus, ovarian fossa or the remaining ovary can be completed by laparoscopy or mini-laparoscopy procedures. This procedure has resulted in healthy offspring being born to patients who suffered from premature ovarian insufficiency.

=== Future possibilities ===
Further research is needed to enable the procedures outlined above to become more successful. One area research is progressing in is that of the 3D printed ovary. A 3D printed microporous hydrogel scaffold could be created, into which isolated ovarian follicles could be implanted. This would support further follicular growth in vivo after transplantation. Full endocrine and reproductive ovarian function was restored in sterilised mice using this method.

== See also ==
- Artificial organs
