= Ovarian stigma =

Area of the ovaries

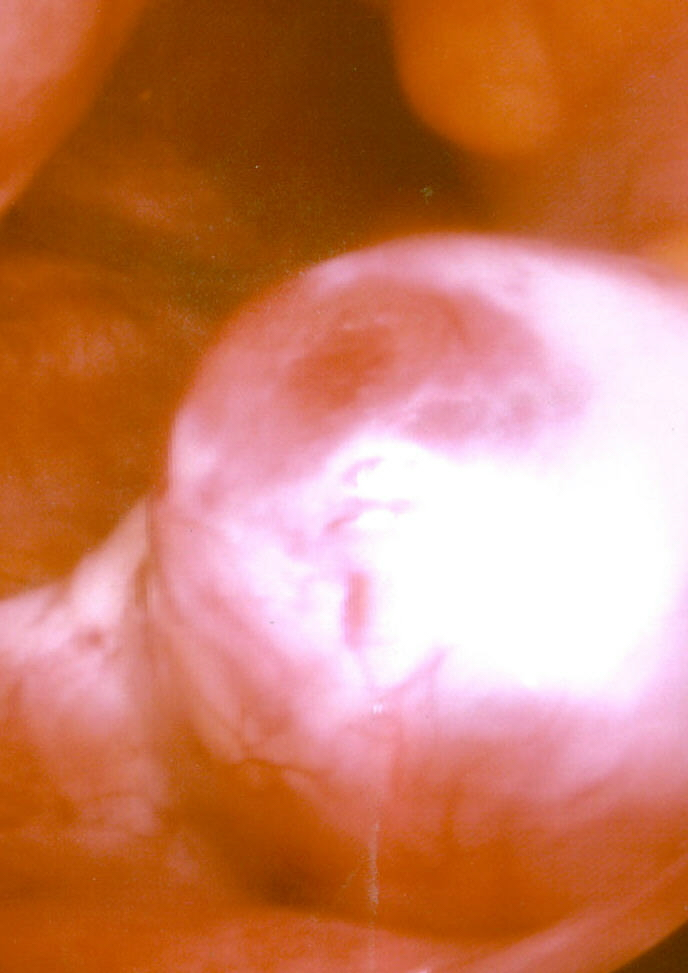
Stigma of the human ovary: the follicle is about to burst

A stigma, also called macula pellucida, in mammalian reproductive anatomy, refers to the area of the ovarian surface where the mature Graafian follicle will burst through during ovulation and release the ovum. As the follicle matures, and increases in size, the area between the follicle and the ovarian surface begins to thin and weaken under the influence of the luteinizing hormone and local cytokines. At ovulation the follicle ruptures and the secondary oocyte is released at the stigma, along with surrounding granulosa cells, from the region of the cumulus oophorus, and follicular fluid. The secondary oocyte needs to be swept into the fallopian tube where it could be fertilized by a sperm cell. The stigma will heal and the residual follicle is transformed into the corpus luteum.
