= Ovarian follicle dominance =

Ovarian follicle dominance is the process where one or more follicles are selected per cycle to ovulate.

In female mammals, each ovulatory cycle, or menstrual cycle in humans, a set number of ovarian follicles ovulate, each follicle releasing an egg that can be fertilised. If that female becomes pregnant, this is the maximum number of offspring she could have. The ovulated follicles come from a larger pool of growing follicles Follicle dominance results from competition between follicles from this growing pool, as only some will be selected for further development. These selected follicles are known as the dominant follicles. In humans, there is usually only one dominant follicle per cycle.

Understanding this system allows medical practitioners to manipulate this process in women in order to help those who have reduced fertility though assisted reproductive technologies (ART). These treatments are able to help women with conditions such as polyendocrine metabolic ovarian syndrome (PMOS) who have reduced fertility be able to conceive. These techniques can also be used in animal conservation and agriculture.

== Underlying biology ==
=== Ovary ===
The ovary is a female gonad, a reproductive organ which produces eggs for reproduction and hormones that are essential for this process. Within the ovary, there are ovarian follicles which contain immature eggs.

=== Ovulation ===
Ovulation is a process where ovarian follicles rupture, releasing eggs that can be fertilized. Follicle dominance results due to competition between follicles, as only some will be selected for further development, which are known as the dominant follicles.

During development some follicles are further ahead in development. The more developed follicles will have more blood vessels in the theca, which means they will have more hormones such as FSH available to cross over the basement membrane into the follicle. They also have more FSH receptors and their mural granulosa cells have started to express LH receptors. Follicles that have these properties become dominant which occurs just as circulating FSH levels are falling. Dominant follicle selection is driven by multiplication of cells (proliferation) and cell death (apoptosis) events. Only the largest, most developed follicles are able to withstand the drop in hormones, therefore only the selected follicles survive, the rest go through follicular atresia (follicle death). In humans, when follicles mature, usually only one becomes dominant. Only the dominant follicle(s) goes through ovulation, so there is usually only a single ovulation during each human menstrual cycle. The more mature follicles that are more sensitive to FSH, can use it to produce inhibin and estrogen through increasing aromatase activity. When levels of circulating FSH drop in response to estrogen levels rising, only the most sensitive follicles to FSH will be able to survive on these low levels. When levels of FSH fall, it is too low to stimulate the other follicles which then go through atresia

=== Feedback loop ===
The hypothalamic-pituitary-ovary axis controls female reproduction. The fall in FSH occurs through an endocrine loop that the dominant follicle causes.

== Disorders ==
In polyendocrine metabolic ovarian syndrome (PMOS), the follicle dominance process is disrupted, and a large number follicles continue to develop each menstrual cycle

== Applications ==
Sometimes follicular dominance is manipulated to allow more follicles to ovulate. This manipulation is known as assisted reproductive technology (ART), a group of scientific techniques used to help infertile couples conceive. This happens via in-vitro fertilization (IVF).

IVF is the process of fertilizing an egg with sperm outside of the body in a laboratory which will then be planted into the mother's or a surrogate's womb. There are several steps involved in IVF. The first is oocyte collection. This is done by hyperstimulation of the ovary to produce multiple ovarian follicles that will release oocytes into the fallopian tubes. These oocytes are then collected via transvaginal oocyte retrieval. The oocytes are then combined with spermatozoa and fertilized. Sometimes the sperm may need to be directly injected into the oocyte via intracytoplasmic sperm injection. The embryos are then grown in the laboratory for 2–5 days before being implanted into the uterus
