= Canine follicle development =

Primordial follicle initiation and development varies by species; in the canine primordial follicle formation occurs 17–54 days post birth. At 17 days, primordial follicles, each of consists of a small oocyte (with no zona pellucida) and a single layer of flattened pre-granulosa cells, can first be observed in the cortical layer of the ovary. The follicles begin to proliferate, and are abundant by day 22. Even though primordial follicles will continue to form, between days 33 and 54 increasing numbers begin to degenerate, along with a decrease in ovarian cortical width. By day 36, primordial follicles occupy a narrow peripheral region of the ovarian cortex, while the rest of the cortical tissue is composed of degenerate primordial follicles, anovular cords and epitheloid cells.

By 120 days, primary follicles have formed, each containing a small oocyte with a zona pellucida, and a single layer of cuboidal granulosa cells. Secondary follicles contain two or more layers of cuboidal granulosa cells, as well as an oocyte greater than 100 um in diameter. Follicular fluid synthesis occurs in tertiary follicles, which can be seen on days 120-160 post birth. Therefore, the time necessary for the recruitment of primordial follicles to tertiary follicles is approximately 70–150 days in the prepubertal dog.
