= Follicular atresia =

Process which prevents follicles from ovulating

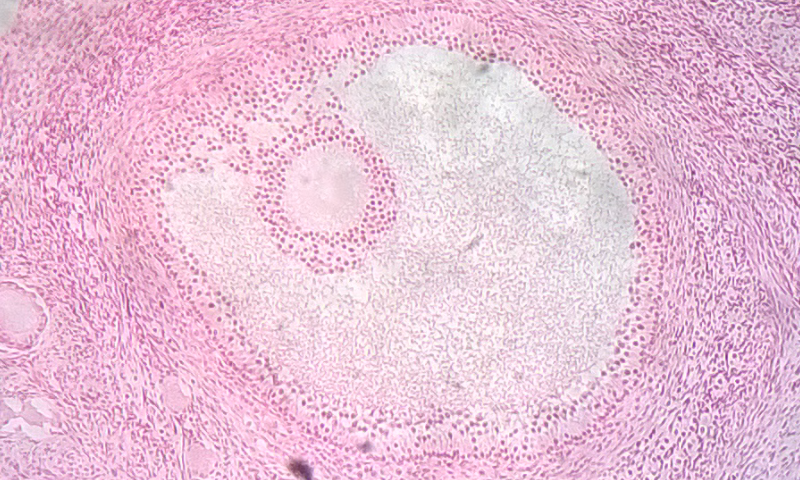
Histological view of an ovarian follicle. The egg is located within the smaller ring.

Follicular atresia refers to the process in which a follicle fails to develop, thus preventing it from ovulating and releasing an egg. It is a normal, naturally occurring progression that occurs as mammalian ovaries age. Approximately 1% of mammalian follicles in ovaries undergo ovulation and the remaining 99% of follicles go through follicular atresia as they cycle through the growth phases. In summary, follicular atresia is a process that leads to the follicular loss and loss of oocytes, and any disturbance or loss of functionality of this process can lead to many other conditions.

== Background ==
Ovaries are the site of development and breakdown of ovarian follicles which secrete hormones and oocytes. Oocytes are immature eggs and are surrounded by granulosa cells and internal and external theca cells. Oocytes are then able to mature within the follicle through meiosis. In humans with ovaries, this process occurs continuously, as they are born with a finite number of follicles (between 500,000 and 1,000,000 follicles), and about 99% of follicles undergo atresia. Only one follicle will be mature enough to release an egg and may be fertilized. Typically around 20 follicles mature each month but only a single follicle is ovulated; the follicle from which the oocyte was released becomes the corpus luteum. The corpus luteum is the last stage of the ovarian follicles' lifecycle. It has an important role in secreting estrogen and progesterone to prepare the body for conception. If conception does not occur, then it will be shed and is known as the corpus albicans. It has been observed that this mechanism is important in regulating and maintaining a healthy reproductive system in mammals.

=== Menopause ===
Follicular atresia occurs throughout all stages of follicular development, until the follicular reserve is completely exhausted. Exhaustion of the follicular reserve occurs at menopause, which is typically around the age of 51 in humans. The dramatic decrease in estrogen and progesterone levels that is characteristic of menopause is caused by follicular atresia. Breakdown of the follicles prevent them from releasing hormones such as estrogen. Progesterone levels also decrease during menopause because without any follicles, there is no development of the corpus luteum, which is the major source of circulating progesterone levels in humans.

== Mechanism ==
Atresia is a complex, hormonally controlled apoptotic process that depends dominantly on granulosa cell apoptosis. Follicular atresia is inhibited by follicle-stimulating hormone (FSH), which promotes follicle development. Once the follicle has developed, it secretes estrogen, which in high levels decreases secretions of FSH. Granulosa cell apoptosis is considered the underlying mechanism of follicular atresia, and has been associated with five ligand-receptor systems involved in cell death:

- Tumor necrosis factor (TNF) and TNF receptors
- Fas ligand and receptors
- TNF-related apoptosis-inducing ligand (TRAIL; also called APO-2) and receptors
- APO-3 ligand and receptors
- PFG-5 ligand and receptors

Granulosa cell apoptosis is promoted by tumor necrosis factor, although the mechanism of how it occurs is unclear.

Fas antigen, a cell surface receptor protein, that is expressed on granulosa cells, mediates signals that induce apoptosis by binding Fas ligand and therefore plays an important role in follicular atresia. Lack of a functional Fas ligand / Fas receptor system has been linked to abnormal follicle development, and increased numbers of secondary follicles as a result of the inability to induce apoptosis.

TNF-related apoptosis-inducing ligand (TRAIL) activates caspase 3 (CASP3), which in turn interacts with caspases 6, 7, 8, 9, and 10 to induce apoptosis in granulosa cells.

In addition, two intracellular inhibitor proteins, cellular FLICE-like inhibitory protein short form (cFLIPS) and long form (cFLIPL), which are strongly expressed in granulosa cells, may act as anti-apoptotic factors.

Anti-Müllerian hormone (AMH) has been studied to be a key regulator in the ovaries in humans that inhibits follicular atresia. It has been proven that AMH reduces the growth of follicles and its upregulation proposes a potential pathophysiological pathway in polyendocrine metabolic ovarian syndrome (PMOS). Using indirect comparators to derive this hypothesis, exploring different patient populations such as individuals who have PMOS help support the hypothesis that AMH may be a key regulator in inhibiting follicular atresia.

It has been proposed that enhanced levels of nitrogen oxide in rats can prevent atresia of the ovarian follicle, while depressed levels have the opposite effect.

== Morphology ==
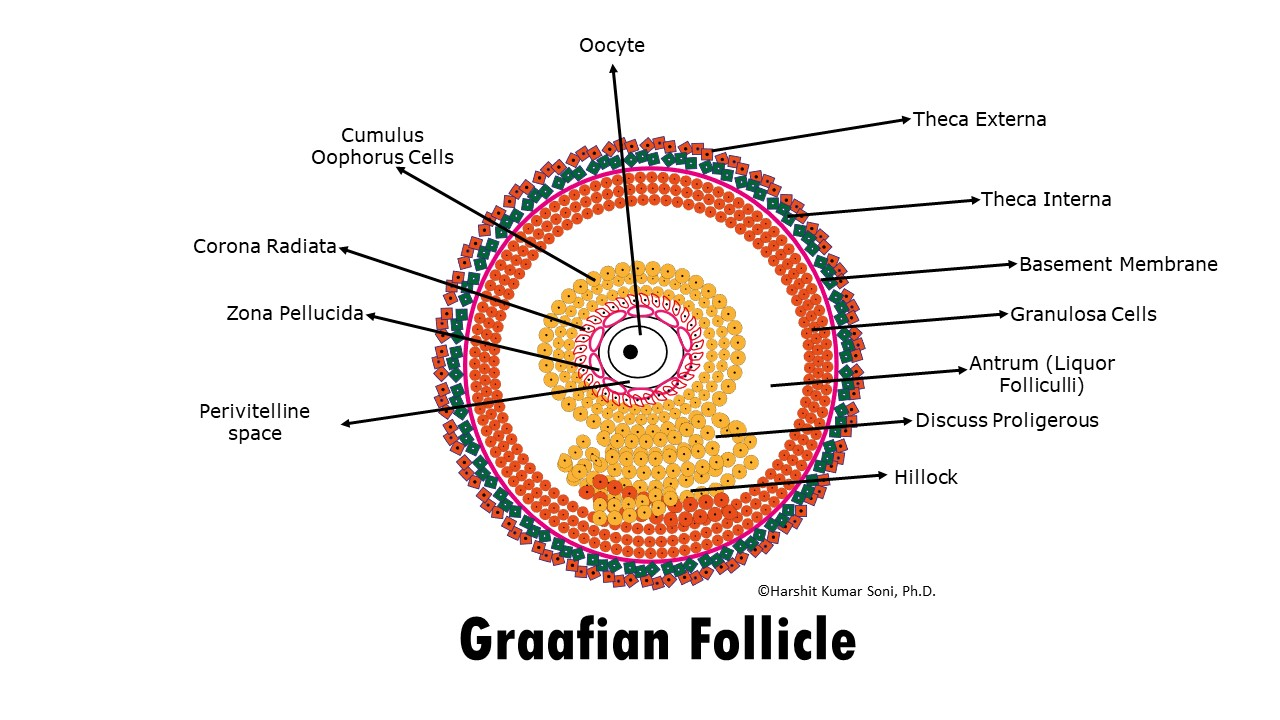
Layers of a mature ovarian follicle right before ovulation.

From studying dairy cows, two forms of follicular atresia have been identified: antral and basal.

=== Antral ===
Antral follicular atresia is characterized by the apoptosis of granulosa cells within the antral layers of the granulosa membrane and sometimes within the antrum itself. During this process, the presence of pyknotic nuclei in the antral layers of the membrane can be observed. Apoptosis ensures that the follicle gets eliminated without triggering an inflammatory response. Antral follicular atresia causes no damage to basal granulosa cells. This type of follicular atresia is often considered the classic and most commonly observed form. In most species, it occurs throughout follicular development and is universally seen in large follicles (>5mm diameter).

=== Basal ===
Basal follicular atresia is characterized by the destruction of granulosa cells in the basal layer of the granulosa membrane. Macrophages have often been observed, penetrating the basal lamina during this type of follicular atresia. These macrophages phagocytose the basal granulosa cells. An increased deposition of collagen in the theca layer of the follicle can also be observed. Basal follicular atresia causes no damage to antral granulosa cells. This form of follicular atresia has only been observed in small follicles of dairy cows (< 5mm diameter), and has not been reported in any other species.

== Related diseases ==
Undergoing follicular atresia is necessary in order for mammals to maintain a healthy reproductive system. Mammalian ovaries ovulate about 1% of the follicles and the remaining follicles may go through atresia as it cycles through the growth phases. However, disorders in the regulation of follicle breakdown and generation can lead to various pathologies:

=== Premature ovarian failure ===
Premature ovarian failure (POF) (also called premature ovarian insufficiency) is the loss of ovarian function before the age of 40 due to follicular dysfunction such as accelerated follicular atresia. POF may present itself with characteristics and symptoms such as loss of menstruation for at least 4 months and also increased serum follicle-stimulating hormone (FSH) concentration (greater than or equal to 40 IU/L). There may be many causes of POF, ranging from genetic disorders to surgery, radiation therapy, and exposure to environmental toxicants. Accelerated follicular atresia due to chromosomal and genomic defects accounts for up to one-half of all POF cases. For example, Fragile X syndrome, Turner syndrome, and various autosomal diseases such as galactosemia have been linked to follicular deficiencies. Smoking has also been found to increase follicular atresia and lead to premature ovarian failure. Some of the short term effects of POF are hot flashes, irregular heart beat/heart palpitations, night sweats, urogenital symptoms, and headaches; some of the more long-term consequences of POF are osteoporosis, infertility, cardiovascular diseases, and possible premature death.

=== Ovarian follicular cysts ===
When an ovarian follicle fails to undergo atresia and release an egg, it can grow to form a cyst. This may be due to an overproduction of FSH or an inadequate supply of LH. Most follicular cysts are harmless and resolve on their own within several months. However, rarely a cyst will grow to be very large (greater than 7 cm), cause abdominal pain, or rupture, in which case pain relievers or emergency surgery may be required. If the cyst lasts for longer than a few months, a physician may recommend surgical removal or testing to determine if it is cancerous. Ultrasound is a common method of visualizing a cyst to determine treatment.

=== Ovarian cancer ===
Ovarian cancer is highly prevalent amongst women and leads to many deaths in the United States. Since FSH inhibits follicular atresia, the overproduction of FSH can lead to excessive follicle formation and increased risk of ovarian cancer.

The inability to regulate granulosa cell apoptosis and undergo follicular atresia, due to overexpression of certain genes, has been linked to the development of some hormone-related cancers (such as granulosa cell tumors) and chemo-resistance in mouse models.

According to the gonadotropin theory, follicular depletion associated with incessant follicular atresia has also been hypothesized as a potential etiology for ovarian cancer, due to an increase in serum gonadotropins. This leads to an inflammatory environment which promotes cellular turnover and tumor development.

Ovarian cancer is characterized by some generalized symptoms such as bloating or swelling in the abdomen, pelvic pain, gastrointestinal symptoms (i.e. loss of appetite, nausea, constipation, and unexpected weight loss). Many people who are diagnosed with ovarian cancer also report feeling very full fast and many of them having a feeling on unexpected continuous bloating in their abdomen.

=== Polyendocrine metabolic ovarian syndrome ===
Polyendocrine metabolic ovarian syndrome (PMOS) (formerly known as polycystic ovarian syndrome) affects 6-12% of women of reproductive age in the United States, and is one of the common causes of female infertility. The mechanism of PMOS is unknown, but is multifactorial. It has been observed that certain heritable genes related to steroid and androgenic hormone production may contribute to development of the disease, as well as environmental factors such as insulin resistance and obesity.

Diagnosis of PMOS is based on meeting two of the three clinical criteria based on the Rotterdam Criteria: chronic anovulation (the ovum is not released from the ovary during menstrual cycle), hyperandrogenism (increased levels of androgen hormones, such as testosterone), and large number of ovarian cysts on ultrasound or elevated anti-Müllerian hormone. Although the arrested follicles seen on ultrasound are conventionally called "cysts", they are not pathological ovarian cysts, and people with PMOS are no more likely to develop pathological ovarian cysts than people without PMOS. Symptoms and characteristics of PMOS include irregular or missed periods, excess body hair or thinning hair, weight gain, acne.

PMOS is correlated with other metabolic comorbidities, particularly obesity and insulin resistance. People with PMOS are predisposed to type II diabetes. Other characteristics include traditional cardiovascular disease risk factors such as dyslipidemia and hypertension.

Insulin resistance and subsequent hyperinsulinemia may be the key factor underlying many of the changes seen in PMOS. Together with luteinizing hormone (LH), insulin stimulates androgen production in the ovaries, leading to the masculinizing effects of PMOS (eg. hirsutism). LH and insulin also work together to cause premature growth of follicles while inhibiting normal maturation. This causes high numbers of stagnant follicles, which do not go through the normal cycle of follicular dominance or atresia.

The basis of non-pharmacological treatment of PMOS is lifestyle changes aimed at weight loss, such dietary change and increasing exercise. While there is no one optimal diet or superior diet, as this disease is highly individualized, diets that impact weight loss and insulin resistance have been shown to improve reproductive function.

Pharmacological management may be recommended for those with significant comorbid conditions, such as type II diabetes and hypertension. First-line treatment for PMOS is contraceptive medication, which directly inhibits the effects of LH on the ovary, preventing excess androgen synthesis. Insulin sensitizers (eg. metformin), statins, or androgen inhibitors may be added as needed. As PMOS is a highly individualized condition, each individual's management and goals will look different.

== See also ==
- Advanced maternal age
- Female infertility
- Folliculogenesis
- Oogenesis
- Ovarian aging
- Ovarian follicle
- Ovarian reserve
- Premature ovarian failure
