= Cumulus oophorus =

Cluster of cells surrounding an oocyte

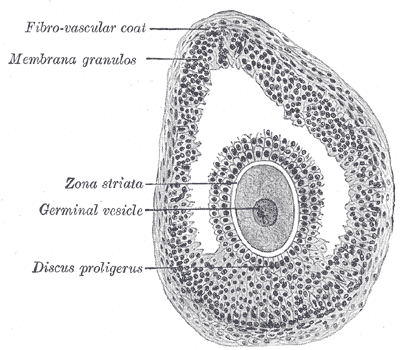
- Section of vesicular ovarian follicle of a cat. X 50. (Discus proligerus labeled at lower left.)

Details

Identifiers
- Latin: cumulus oophorus discus proliger
- FMA: 18659

The cumulus oophorus (discus proligerus) is a cluster of cells that surround the oocyte both in the ovarian follicle and after ovulation. In the antral follicle, it may be regarded as an extension of the membrana granulosa. The innermost layer of these cells is the corona radiata.

This layer of cells must be penetrated by spermatozoa for fertilization to occur.

== Functions ==
Functions of the cumulus oophorus include coordination of follicular development and oocyte maturation. Mechanisms of the latter include stimulation of amino acid transport and sterol biosynthesis and regulation of oocyte gene transcription.

It also provides energy substrates for oocyte meiotic resumption and promotes glycolysis.

Cumulus oophorus cells contribute heavily to the maturation and eventual fertilization of an oocyte. As a follicle grows in size and the antrum develops, more layers of cumulus oophorus cells accumulate around the oocyte to aid in the acrosome reaction that enables the sperm to penetrate into the oocyte. The proximity between the cumulus oophorus cells and the oocyte favors bidirectional communication, which is vital for oocyte development.

== Gene expression profiling ==
As a part of the process of in vitro fertilization, gene expression profiling of cumulus cells can be performed to estimate oocyte quality and the efficiency of an ovarian hyperstimulation protocol, and may indirectly predict oocyte aneuploidy, embryo development and pregnancy outcomes. Increased knowledge in these aspects is useful in, for example, embryo selection.

In gene expression profiling of cumulus cells, genes where increased expression is correlated with higher oocyte competence or better pregnancy outcomes, include: HAS2, GREM1 and PTGS2.

In contrast, genes where increased expression is correlated with lower oocyte competence or worse pregnancy outcomes include: BDNF, CCND2, CXCR4, GPX3, HSPB1, DVL3, DHCR7, CTNND1, TRIM28, STAR, AREG, CX43, PTGS2, SCD1 and SCD5.
