= Antral follicle =

Part of an ovary

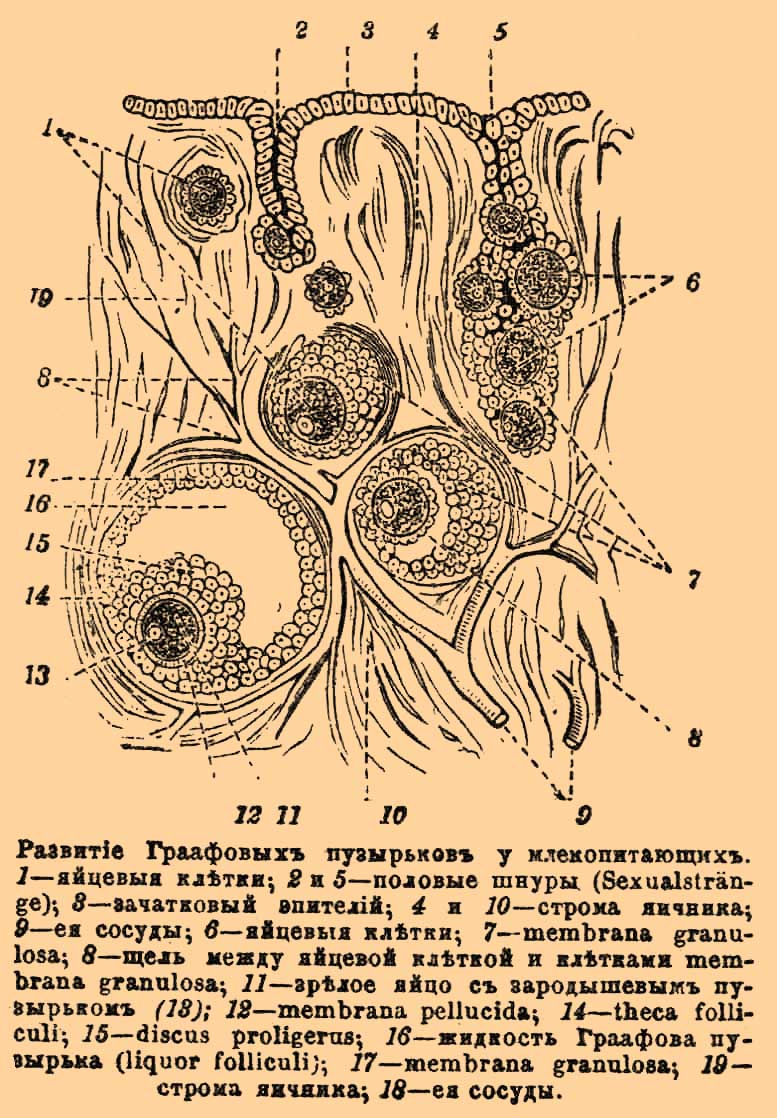
Antral follicle

An antral follicle, is a tertiary follicle, a developing ovarian follicle that may progress to a mature pre-ovulatory follicle known as a Graafian follicle.

Definitions differ in where the shift into an antral follicle occurs in the staging of folliculogenesis, with some stating that it occurs when entering the secondary stage, and others stating that it occurs when entering the tertiary stage.

During folliculogenesis a cavity known as an antrum is formed. Follicular fluid begins to fill the antrum and when filled the follicle is known as an antral follicle.

== Appearance ==
The antral follicle is marked by the formation of a fluid-filled cavity adjacent to the oocyte called the antrum. The basic structure of the mature follicle has formed and no novel cells are detectable. Granulosa and theca cells continue to undergo mitosis concomitant with an increase in antrum volume. Antral follicles can attain a tremendous size that is hampered only by the availability of follicle stimulating hormone (FSH), on which it is dependent in this stage of folliculogenesis.

By command of an oocyte-secreted morphogenic gradient, the antral follicle's granulosa cells differentiate into subpopulations. Cells from the membrana granulosa extend to form a cluster of cells, the cumulus oophorus that surround the oocyte. The inner layer of these cells form the corona radiata adjacent to the outer shell of the oocyte, the zona pellucida. The cells remaining from the membrana granulosa that line the follicle wall are known as mural granulosa.

== Endocrine properties ==
Theca cells express receptors for luteinizing hormone (LH). The LH surge triggers the production of androgens by the theca cells, most notably androstenedione, which are aromatized by granulosa cells to produce estrogens, primarily estradiol. Consequently, estrogen levels begin to rise.

== Antral follicle count ==
The antral follicle count (AFC) is the number of antral follicles, generally in both ovaries taken together and determined by transvaginal ultrasonography.

A low AFC is a major factor in the diagnosis of poor ovarian reserve, that is, low fertility characterized by low numbers of remaining oocytes in the ovaries, usually accompanied by high follicle stimulating hormone (FSH) levels. Several studies show that an AFC test is more accurate than basal FSH testing for older women (< 44 years of age) in predicting IVF outcome. However, it does not appear to add any predictive information about success rates of an already established pregnancy after IVF.

It is also a major determinant of the success of ovarian hyperstimulation.

There are three categories when performing an ultrasound to check the antral follicle count:

- Low follicle count (1-3): low ovarian reserve and increased risk of menopause in the next 7 years.
- Normal follicle count (4-24): Normal follicle amount for women in reproductive age.
- High follicle count (>=): High risk of hyperandrogenism.

It has been suggested that counting all identifiable antral follicles of 2–10 mm in diameter, rather than a more limited range, would provide the most practical method for assessment of AFC in clinical practice.

Three-dimensional (3D) automated follicular tracking may substantially improve inter-rater reliability in estimating the AFC.
