= Folliculogenesis =

Process of maturation of primordial follicles

Although the process is similar in many animals, this article will deal exclusively with human folliculogenesis.

Diagrammatic stages shown in the ovary.

Folliculogenesis takes place in the ovary as the progressive maturation of a primordial follicle, an early ovarian follicle, that contains the developing egg cell. This process is interdependent with oogenesis, the development of an oocyte to a mature egg cell capable of being fertilized.

The pool of primordial follicles is established during prenatal development. Each primordial follicle consists of an oocyte surrounded by a layer of somatic cells known as pre-granulosa cells or follicular cells. The follicle is encapsulated by a follicular basal lamina. At puberty the primordial cells become activated to transition to primary follicles, secondary follicles and pre-ovulatory antral follicles capable of releasing a mature egg cell. This stage takes place in the menstrual cycle as the follicular phase of the ovarian cycle, and takes around two and a half months. Primordial follicles are also referred to as non-growing follicles.

Unlike male spermatogenesis, which can last indefinitely, folliculogenesis ends when the remaining follicles in the ovaries are incapable of responding to the hormonal cues that previously recruited some follicles to mature. This depletion in follicle supply signals the beginning of menopause.

Although the complete process of folliculogenesis takes place at puberty, early stages begin in the neonatal ovary and continue during childhood. Without the influence of hormones produced at puberty the follicles cannot proceed to maturity, and degenerate. The prepubertal ovaries show a high proportion of malformed non-growing follicles, that will also be lost by the onset of puberty.

== Stages ==
(a) The maturation of a follicle. FSH stimulates the growth of a tertiary follicle, and LH stimulates the production of estrogen by granulosa and theca cells. The mature follicle ruptures and releases the oocyte. Cells remaining in the follicle then develop into the corpus luteum. (b) In this electron micrograph of a secondary follicle, the oocyte, theca cells, and developing antrum are clearly visible.

Folliculogenesis is continuous, meaning that at any time the ovary contains follicles in many stages of development. In the developing ovary the majority of follicles die (follicular atresia) and never complete development. The prepubertal ovaries show a high proportion of malformed non-growing follicles, that will also be lost at puberty.

In the mature ovary at puberty follicles can continue development with a few developing fully into a tertiary follicle containing a mature oocyte capable of being fertilised, which is released by rupture of the follicle in the process of ovulation.

The growing follicle passes through the following distinct stages that are defined by certain structural characteristics:

In addition, follicles that have formed an antrum are called antral follicles that may progress to mature or Graafian follicles. Definitions differ in where this shift occurs in the staging given above, with some stating that it occurs when entering the secondary stage, and others stating that it occurs when entering the tertiary stage.

Until the preovulatory stage, the follicle contains a primary oocyte that is arrested in prophase of meiosis I. During the late preovulatory stage, the oocyte continues meiosis and becomes a secondary oocyte, arrested in metaphase II.

=== Primordial ===
At 18–22 weeks post-conception, the cortex of the ovary contains its peak number of primordial follicles (about 4 to 5 million in the average case, but individual peak populations range from 6 to 7 million). They consist of primary oocytes surrounded by flat, squamous granulosa cells (support cells) that are segregated from the oocyte's environment by the basal lamina. They are quiescent, showing little to no biological activity. Because primordial follicles can be dormant for up to 50 years in humans, the length of the ovarian cycle does not include this time.

During the maturation of the primary oocyte an oocyte maturation inhibitor (OMI) is created by follicular cells. OMI is a small peptide, an inhibitory factor believed to be the reason why the oocyte remains for so long in the immature dictyate state of meiosis.

The supply of follicles decreases slightly before birth, and to 500,000 by puberty for the average case (populations at puberty range from 25,000 to 1.5 million). By virtue of the "inefficient" nature of folliculogenesis (discussed later), only 400–500 of these follicles will ever reach the preovulatory stage. At menopause, only 1,000 follicles remain. It seems likely that early menopause occurs for women with low populations at birth, and late menopause occurs for women with high populations at birth, but there is as yet no clinical evidence for this.

The process by which primordial follicles 'wake up' is known as initial recruitment. Research has shown that initial recruitment is mediated by the counterbalance of various stimulatory and inhibitory hormones and locally produced growth factors.

=== Primary ===
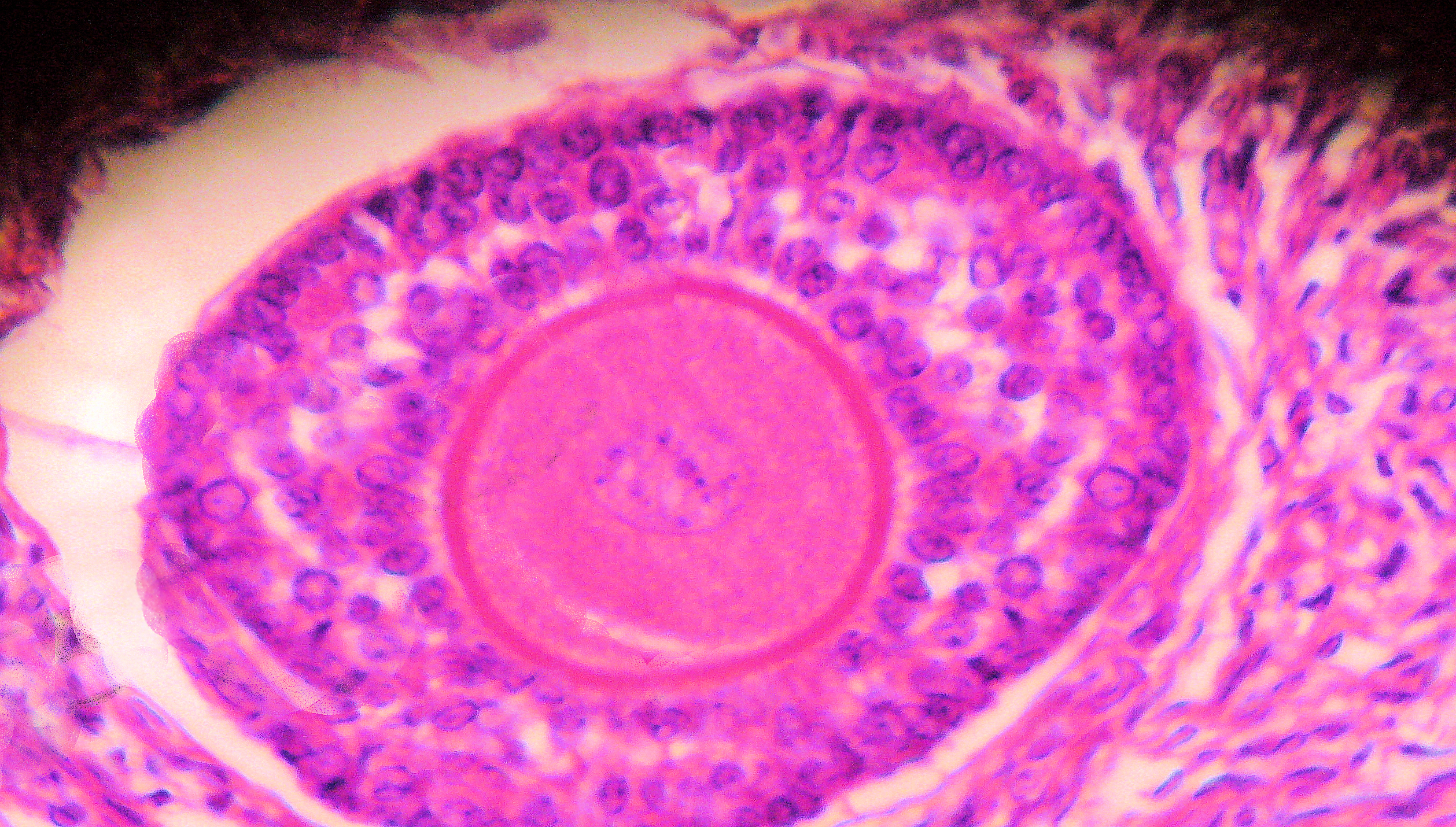
Human late primary follicle

During ovarian follicle activation, the follicular cells of the primordial follicles change from squamous to cuboidal granulosa cells, marking the beginning of the primary follicle. The oocyte genome is activated and genes become transcribed. Rudimentary paracrine signaling pathways that are vital for communication between the granulosa cells and oocyte are formed. Both the oocyte and the follicle grow dramatically, increasing to almost 0.1 mm in diameter.

Primary follicles develop receptors to follicle-stimulating hormone (FSH) at this time, but they are gonadotropin-independent until the antral stage. Research has shown, however, that the presence of FSH accelerates follicle growth in vitro.

Granulosa cells secrete a glycoprotein gel around the oocyte. This layer is termed the zona pellucida and protects the oocyte from antibodies and other toxins. The zona pellucida remains with the oocyte after ovulation, and contains enzymes that catalyze with sperm to allow penetration of the egg.

=== Secondary ===
Stroma-like theca cells are recruited by oocyte-secreted signals. They surround the follicle's outermost layer, the basal lamina, and undergo cytodifferentiation to become the theca externa and theca interna. An intricate network of capillary vessels forms between these two thecal layers and begins to circulate blood to and from the follicle.

The late-term secondary follicle is marked histologically and structurally by a fully grown oocyte surrounded by a zona pellucida, approximately nine layers of granulosa cells, a basal lamina, a theca interna, a capillary net, and a theca externa. The development of the antrum also starts taking place in secondary follicle stage.

==== Antrum formation ====
The formation of a fluid-filled cavity in the secondary follicle called the follicular antrum designates the follicle as an antral follicle, in contrast to a so-called preantral follicle that still lacks an antrum.

Follicular fluid fills the antrum that surrounds the oocyte in the follicle. The appearance of follicular fluid during follicular maturation is the first sign that a follicle has reached the next stage of maturation. The fluid is rich in hyaluronic acid, and is used in a modified intracytoplasmic sperm injection (ICSI) called physiological ICSI (PICSI), semi-viscous and yellow in colour. Its components come mainly from granulosa cells.

=== Early tertiary ===
In the tertiary follicle, the basic structure of the mature follicle has formed and no novel cells are detectable. Granulosa and theca cells continue to undergo mitosis concomitant with an increase in antrum volume. Tertiary follicles can attain a tremendous size that is hampered only by the availability of FSH, which it is now dependent on.

Under action of an oocyte-secreted morphogenic gradient, the granulosa cells of the tertiary follicle undergo differentiation into four distinct subtypes: corona radiata, surrounding the zona pellucida; membrana, interior to the basal lamina; periantral, adjacent to the antrum and cumulus oophorus, which connects the membrana and corona radiata granulosa cells together. Each type of cell behaves differently in response to FSH.

Theca interna cells express receptors for luteinizing hormone (LH). LH induces the production of androgens by the theca cells, most notably androstendione, which are aromatized by granulosa cells to produce estrogens, primarily estradiol. Consequently, estrogen levels begin to rise.

=== Late tertiary and preovulatory (the follicular phase of the menstrual cycle) ===
At this point, the majority of the group of follicles that started growth have died. This process of follicle death is known as atresia, and it is characterized by radical apoptosis of all constituent cells and the oocyte. Although it is not known what causes atresia, the presence of high concentrations of FSH has been shown to prevent it.

A rise in pituitary FSH caused by the disintegration of the corpus luteum at the conclusion of a menstrual cycle precipitates the recruitment of five to seven class 5 follicles to participate in the next cycle. These follicles enter the end of the prior menstrual cycle and transition into the follicular phase of the next one. The selected follicles, called antral follicles, compete with each other for growth-inducing FSH.

The pattern of this emergence of a cohort of five to seven antral follicles is debated. There are theories of continuous recruitment of antral follicles, theories of a single recruitment episode at the end of the luteal phase, and more recently there has been evidence for a recruitment model marked by 2 - 3 waves of follicle recruitment and development during the menstrual cycle (only one of which is actually an ovulatory wave).

In response to the rise of FSH, the antral follicles begin to secrete estrogen and inhibin, which have a negative feedback effect on FSH. Follicles that have fewer FSH-receptors will not be able to develop further; they will show retardation of their growth rate and become atretic. Eventually, only one antral follicle will be viable. This remaining follicle, called the dominant follicle, will grow quickly and dramatically—up to 20 mm in diameter—to become the preovulatory follicle.

The follicular phase of the menstrual cycle is the time between selection of a tertiary follicle and its subsequent growth into a preovulatory follicle. The actual time for development of a follicle varies.

The growth of the dominant follicle during the follicular phase is about 1.5 mm per day (±0.1 mm), both in natural cycles and for any dominant follicle developing while taking combined oral contraceptive pill. Performing controlled ovarian hyperstimulation leads to a greater recruitment of follicles, growing at about 1.6 mm per day.

== Ovulation ==
By the end of the follicular phase of the menstrual cycle, the oocyte is ready to be released, and during ovulation the follicle ruptures at a weakened part of the ovary known as the stigma, releasing the egg. The remains of the follicle include granulosa cells and theca cells that develop into the corpus luteum which sustains the uterine lining through its production of progesterone.

== Hormone function ==
Folliculogenesis is controlled by an endocrine system, the hypothalamic–pituitary–ovarian axis (HPO axis), and involves five hormones in an intricate regulatory process of positive and negative feedback. Gonadotropin-releasing hormone (GnRH)) secreted by the hypothalamus stimulates the release of two gonadotropins – follicle stimulating hormone (FSH), and luteinizing hormone (LH) from the anterior pituitary. Two sex hormones – estrogen, and progesterone act either to stimulate or inhibit the release of the gonadotropins.

GnRH stimulates the release of FSH and LH from the anterior pituitary gland that will later have a stimulatory effect on follicle growth (not immediately, however, because only antral follicles are dependent on FSH and LH). When theca cells form in the tertiary follicle the amount of estrogen increases sharply (theca-derived androgen is aromatized into estrogen by the granulosa cells).

At low concentration, estrogen inhibits gonadotropins, but high concentration of estrogen stimulates them. In addition, as more estrogen is secreted, more LH receptors are made by the theca cells, inciting theca cells to create more androgen that will become estrogen downstream. This positive feedback loop causes LH to spike sharply, and it is this spike that causes ovulation.

Following ovulation, LH stimulates the formation of the corpus luteum. Estrogen has since dropped to negative stimulatory levels after ovulation and therefore serves to maintain the concentration of FSH and LH. Inhibin, which is also secreted by the corpus luteum, contributes to FSH inhibition. Progesterone, secreted by the corpus luteum, inhibits the follicular growth and maintains the pregnancy.

The endocrine system coincides with the menstrual cycle and goes through thirteen cycles (and thus thirteen LH spikes) during the course of normal folliculogenesis. However, coordinated enzyme signalling and the time-specific expression of hormonal receptors ensures that follicle growth does not become dysregulated during these premature spikes.

== Depletion of the ovarian reserve ==
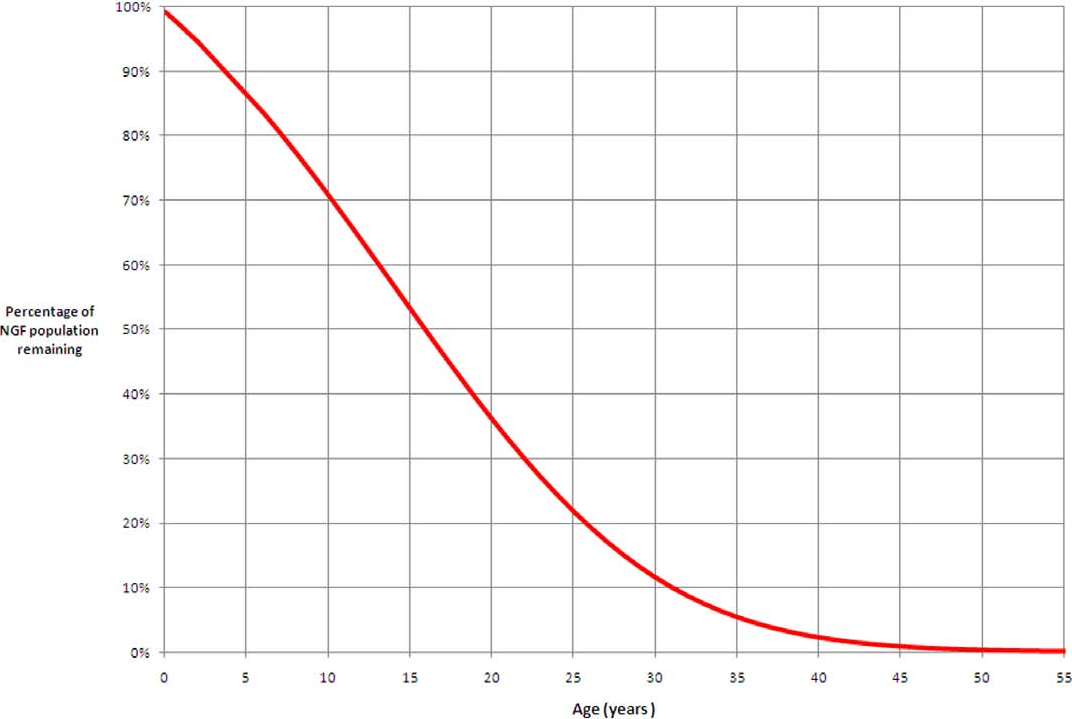
The curve shows the decline in the number of primordial folicles from birth until menopause. A study has proposed that by the age of 30 years only 12% of the ovarian reserve remains which decreases to just 3% by the age of 40 years.

With aging, double-strand breaks accumulate in the primordial follicle reserve. The primary oocytes are arrested in prophase of the first cell division of meiosis. Double-strand breaks are accurately repaired during meiosis by searching for, and building off of, the matching strand, termed homologous recombinational repair. A study showed that with advancing age, expression of four key DNA repair genes necessary for homologous recombinational repair declines in oocytes. This led to the hypothesis that DNA double-strand break repair is vital for the maintenance of oocyte reserve, and that a decline in efficiency of repair with age plays a key role in the depletion of the ovarian reserve.

== Additional images ==
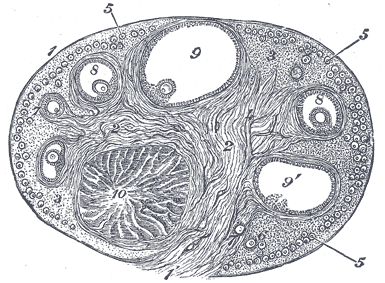
Section of the ovary. (#5 through #9 represent stages of folliculogenesis)

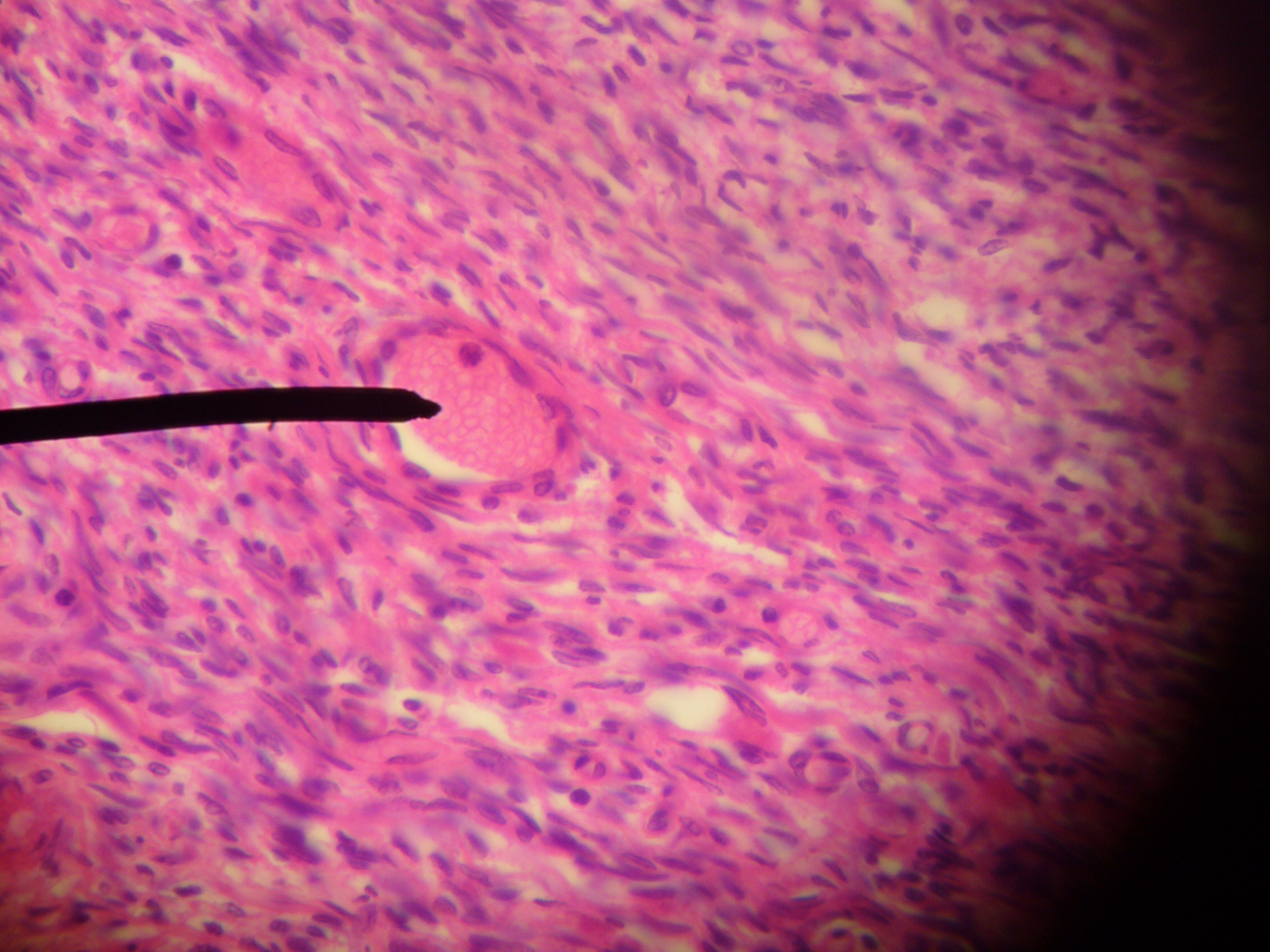
transitional primary follicle
