= Granulosa cell =

Mammal reproductive system cell

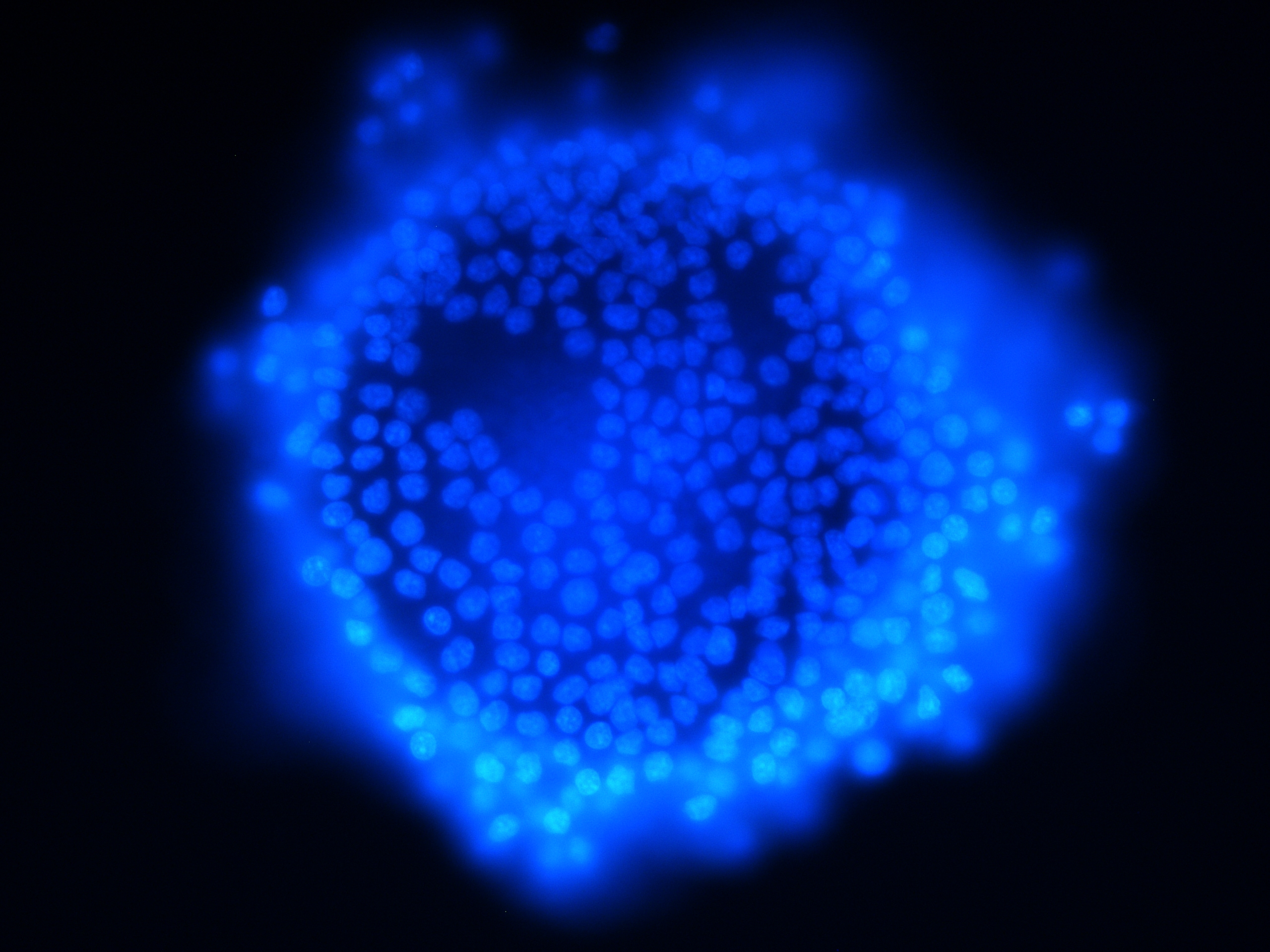
Pig oocyte surrounded by granulosa cells. Fluorescence microscopy, colored with DAPI.

A granulosa cell is a somatic cell of the sex cord that is closely associated with the developing female gamete (egg cell). The egg cell develops from a primary oocyte (an immature egg cell) in the ovary of mammals. A primary oocyte is at first enclosed in a single layer of flat or squamous epithelial cells, called follicular cells or pre-granulosa cells, known together as a primordial follicle.

As a primordial follicle transitions to a primary follicle the follicular cells change from flat to cuboidal and are known as granulosa cells. In the development of the follicles, granulosa cells first proliferate and form a multilayered stratified cuboidal epithelium that forms an inner lining to the follicle. This is also known as the membrana granulosa.

On progression to a mature antral follicle, the granulosa cells form two subpopulations. Cells from the layer of the lining nearest to the oocyte grow in numbers to produce a cluster of cells called the cumulus oophorus that surround the oocyte whilst the remaining cells of the lining become known as the mural granulosa. The layer of cumulus cells that is closest to the oocyte differentiates to a layer known as the corona radiata. These cells are outside of the zona pellucida and extend fine cytoplasmic processes to penetrate this outer shell and maintain contact with the oocyte.

== Types by location ==
=== Membrana granulosa ===
During folliculogenesis, the squamous epithelial cells known as follicular cells or pre-granulosa cells that surround the oocyte, change to cuboidal granulosa cells. This change takes place as the primordial follicle changes into an early primary follicle. In the later primary follicle the granulosa cells proliferate into a multilayered stratified cuboidal epithelium that forms an inner lining to the follicle. This is also known as the membrana granulosa.

=== Cumulus oophorus ===
Progressing to an antral follicle the granulosa cells form two subpopulations. Cells from the layer of the membrana granulosa lining nearest to the oocyte grow in numbers to produce a cluster of cells called the cumulus oophorus that surround the oocyte. The remaining cells of the lining become known as the mural granulosa.

==== Corona radiata ====
The layer of cumulus cells that is closest to the oocyte differentiates to a layer known as the corona radiata. These cells are adjacent to the zona pellucida. The granulosa cells need to stay in contact with the oocyte and cells from the corona radiata extend long fine cytoplasmic processes known as transzonal projections (TZPs) that penetrate the width of the zona pellucida to maintain contact with the oocyte membrane. Oocyte microvilli are proposed to help in supporting the TZP tips at the oocyte surface.

Up to 70 TZPs may project from a single granulosa cell. Many of these fine processes have a backbone of actin, and some of tubulin, suggestive of filopodia. The differences may indicate separate roles. Not all of the TZPs penetrate the zona pellucida and some stay on the outside directed towards other cumulus cells, giving additional direct communication throughout the follicle.

Gap junctions form at the sites of TZP-oocyte contact whereby granulosa cells can transfer small molecules to the oocyte, and the oocyte can pass back growth factors. Extracellular vesicles have also been seen at these contact sites that would enable organelles to be transported to the oocyte. At the time of ovulation the processes rapidly dissociate their connections with the oocyte.

=== Mural granulosa ===
The granulosa cells that remain after the cumulus cells separate, line the follicle wall as mural granulosa. With growth, the diameter of the oocyte increases, cumulus cells are pushed further away from the oocyte and the mural cells become more distant, so that paracrine signaling by way of follicular fluid also has to increase.

== Function ==
Later in follicle development (folliculogenesis), granulosa cells advance to form a multilayered cumulus oophorus surrounding the oocyte in the preovulatory or antral (or Graafian) follicle.

The major functions of granulosa cells include the production of sex steroids, as well as a range of growth factors thought to interact with the oocyte during its development. Sex steroid production begins with follicle-stimulating hormone (FSH) from the anterior pituitary, stimulating granulosa cells to convert androgens (coming from the thecal cells) to estradiol by aromatase during the follicular phase of the menstrual cycle. Following ovulation, and the rupture of the follicle, the mural granulosa cells, together with the theca cells remain in the ovary and form the corpus luteum to produce progesterone. The progesterone may maintain a potential pregnancy and causes production of a thick cervical mucus that inhibits sperm entry into the uterus.

== Development ==
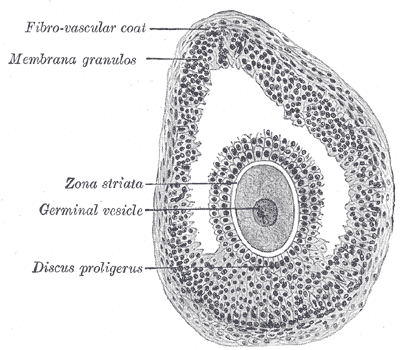
Section of vesicular ovarian follicle of a cat. X 50. Membrana granulosa labeled at upper left.

In the development of the urinary and reproductive organs, the oogonia become invaginated in the gonadal ridge.

The embryological origin of granulosa cells remains controversial. In the 1970s, evidence emerged that the first cells to make contact with the oogonia were of mesonephric origin. It was suggested that mesonephric cells already closely associated with the oogonia proliferated throughout development to form the granulosa cell layer. Recently, this hypothesis has been challenged with some thorough histology. Sawyer et al. hypothesized that in sheep most of the granulosa cells develop from cells of the mesothelium (i.e., epithelial cells from the presumptive surface epithelium of the ovary). In 2013, it was proposed that both granulosa cells and the ovarian surface epithelial cells are instead derived from a precursor cell called gonadal-ridge epithelial-like cell.

== Cumulus cells (CC) vs mural granulosa cells (MGC) ==
Cumulus cells (CC) surround the oocyte. They provide nutrients to the oocyte and influence the development of the oocyte in a paracrine fashion. Mural granulosa cells (MGC) line the follicular wall and surround the fluid-filled antrum. The oocyte secretes factors that determine the functional differences between CCs and MGCs. CCs primarily support growth and development of the oocyte whereas MGCs primarily serve an endocrine function and support the growth of the follicle. Cumulus cells aid in oocyte development and show higher expression of SLC38A3, a transporter for amino acids, and Aldoa, Eno1, Ldh1, Pfkp, Pkm2, and Tpi1, enzymes responsible for glycolysis. MGCs are more steroidogenically active and have higher levels of mRNA expression of steroidogenic enzymes such as cytochrome P450. MGCs produce an increasing amount of estrogen which leads to the LH surge. Following the LH surge, cumulus cells undergo cumulus expansion, in which they proliferate at a ten-fold higher rate than MGCs in response to FSH. During expansion CCs also produce a mucified matrix required for ovulation.

== Cell culture ==
Cell culture of granulosa cells can be performed in vitro. Plating density (number of cells per volume of culture medium) plays a critical role for the differentiation. A lower plating density makes granulosa cells exhibit estrogen production, while a higher plating density makes them appear as progesterone producing theca lutein cells.

== Ovarian aging ==
In the female rhesus monkey, DNA double-strand breaks increase in granulosa cells with age, and the ability to repair such DNA breaks declines with age. These changes at the DNA level in granulosa cells may contribute to ovarian aging.

== See also ==
- Granulosa cell tumour
- Ovulation
- List of human cell types derived from the germ layers
- List of distinct cell types in the adult human body
