= Ovarian follicle =

Structure containing a single egg cell

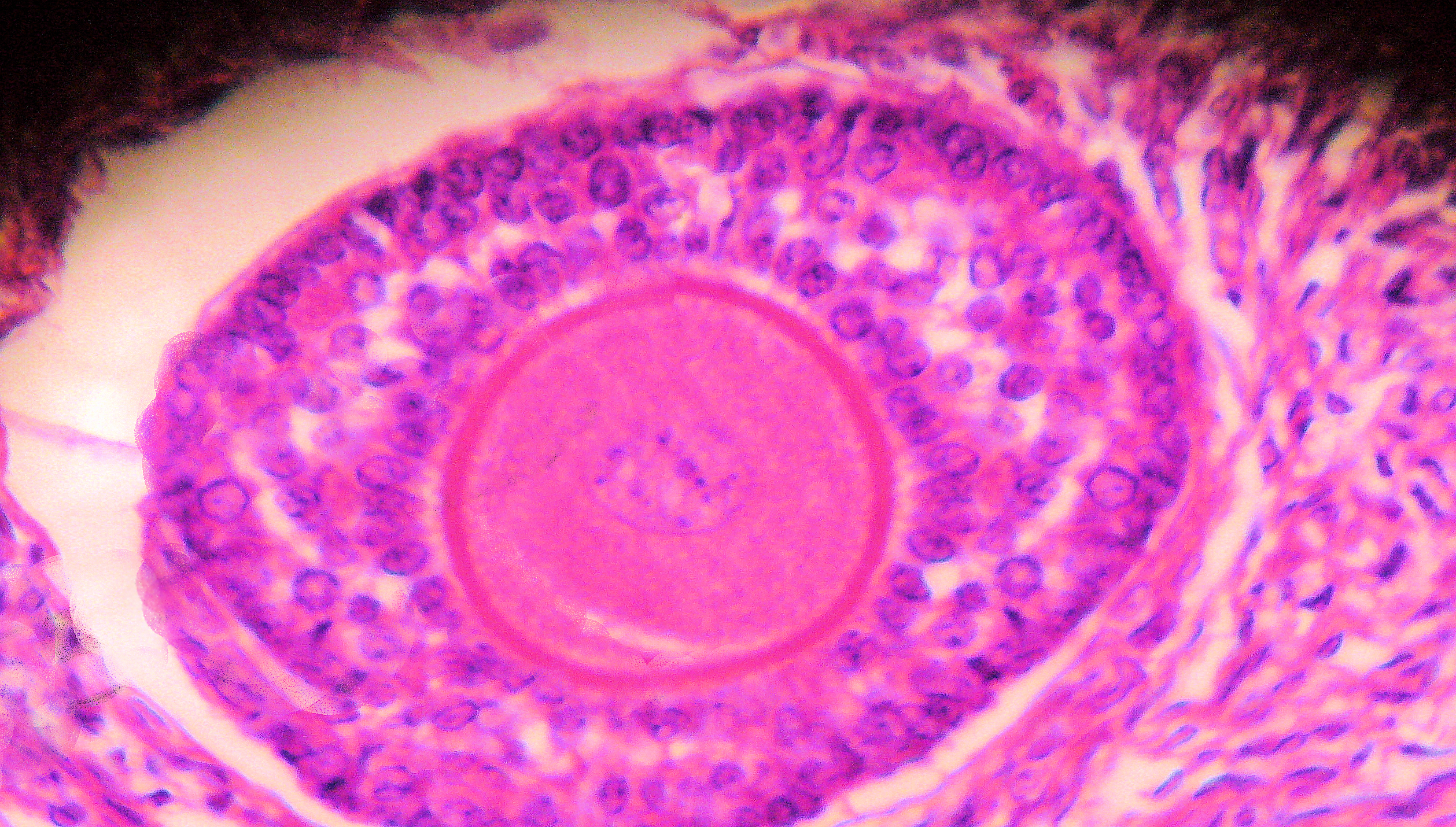
- A human late primary ovarian follicle viewed by microscopy. The round oocyte stained red in the center is surrounded by a layer of granulosa cells, which are enveloped by the basement membrane and theca cells. The magnification is around 1000 times. (H&E stain)

Details
- Precursor: Cortical cords

Identifiers
- Latin: folliculus ovaricus
- MeSH: D006080
- TA98: A09.1.01.013
- TA2: 3482
- FMA: 18640

An ovarian follicle is the reproductive unit in the ovary. The first follicles to form are the primordial follicles consisting of a primary oocyte surrounded by a layer of pre-granulosa cells known as follicular cells. The follicular cells are somatic cells that interact with and support the oocyte during its development involving much cross-talk. Part of this support is the release of fluid to the enclosed oocyte.

The very large number of primordial follicles develop prenatally and forms the established pool of resting follicles that have the potential to develop and release mature egg cells. Many follicles are lost along the way resulting in around six million at birth. In the progression towards puberty many more are lost resulting in around 200,000 to 300,000 follicles available at the start of the female's reproductive life. The follicles are selected and developed once every menstrual cycle with around 300-400 being ovulated during a woman's reproductive lifetime.

The follicle also secretes hormones that influence stages of the menstrual cycle.

== Structure ==
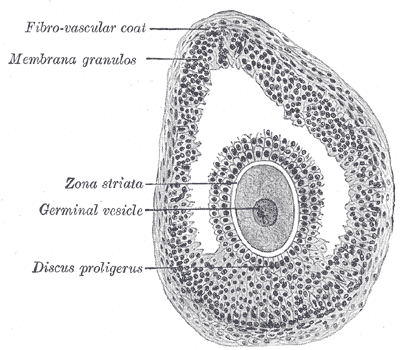
Section of vesicular ovarian follicle of cat. X 50.

Ovarian follicles are the basic units of the human female reproductive system. Each primordial follicle consists of a single oocyte (immature ovum or egg cell) surrounded by a layer of follicular cells, on a surrounding follicular basal lamina. The follicular cells are somatic cells that provide metabolic support to the oocyte, and also regulatory signals. When the primordial follicles first form, the surrounding follicular cells (pre-granulosa cells) extend long cytoplasmic processes that enclose the oocyte. These are longer than the later forming transzonal projections.

In the process of folliculogenesis the primordial follicles progress through stages that culminate in a dominant follicle that releases a mature (secondary) oocyte at ovulation. Initial stages from primordial to early primary follicle involves the morphological change from follicular to granulosa cells, and the start of the laying down of the zona pellucida around the oocyte. In the late primary stage theca cells develop from the ovarian stroma to surround the follicle. In the transition from primary to secondary follicle the theca cells reorganise into an internal layer and an external layer.

The granulosa cells still need to have contact with the oocyte, and allow cross-talk between them. To accomplish this as the zona pellucida is being laid down they extend fine cytoplasmic processes to pass through this layer. The processes are known as transzonal projections, and they increase in numbers as the zona pellucida completes. At the time of ovulation they rapidly disassociate their connection with the oocyte.

=== Oocyte ===
Once a month, one of the ovaries releases a mature egg cell (ovum), a secondary oocyte. The nucleus of the primary oocyte is called a germinal vesicle.

=== Granulosa cell ===
A monolayer of flat squamous epithelial cells called follicular cells surround the oocyte within the primordial follicle. These change during development of the follicle to cuboidal epithelial cells called granulosa cells. Their numbers increase directly in response to heightened levels of circulating gonadotropins, or decrease in response to testosterone. They also produce peptides involved in ovarian hormone synthesis regulation. Follicle-stimulating hormone (FSH) induces granulosa cells to express luteinizing hormone (LH) receptors on their surfaces; when circulating LH binds to these receptors, proliferation stops. The granulosa cells, are enclosed in a thin layer of extracellular matrix – the follicular basement membrane termed a fibrovascular coat. Underneath the basement membrane the increased numbers of granulosa cells form a stratified cuboidal epithelial covering, called the membrana granulosa. Outside of the basement membrane thecal cells form from the stromal connective tissue.

==== Cumulus oophorus ====
The cumulus oophorus is a cluster of cells (called cumulus cells) in the antral follicle that surround the oocyte both in the ovarian follicle and after ovulation.

== Development ==
Primordial follicles are indiscernible to the naked eye but grow and develop into primary, secondary and tertiary or mature follicles. Mature follicles may be antral follicles and are also called Graafian follicles.

In humans, primordial follicles are established in the ovary before birth and may lie dormant awaiting activation for up to 50 years.

After rupturing, the remains of the follicle form the corpus luteum.

Embryonic development in males and females follows a common pathway before gametogenesis. Once gametogonia enter the gonadal ridge, however, they attempt to associate with these somatic cells. Development proceeds and the gametogonia turn into oogonia, which become fully surrounded by a layer of somatic follicular cells (pre-granulosa cells).

The oogonia multiply by dividing mitotically; this proliferation ends when the oogonia enter meiosis I. The amount of time that oogonia multiply by mitosis is not species specific. In the human fetus, cells undergoing mitosis are seen until the second and third trimester of pregnancy. After beginning the meiotic process, the oogonia (now called primary oocytes) can no longer replicate. Therefore, the total number of gametes is established at this time. Once the primary oocytes stop dividing the cells enter a prolonged 'resting phase'. This 'resting phase' or dictyate stage can last anywhere up to fifty years in the human.

For several primary oocytes that complete meiosis I each month, only one or a few functional oocyte, the dominant follicles, completes maturation and undergoes ovulation. The other follicles that begin to mature will regress and become atretic follicles, eventually deteriorating.

The primary oocyte turns into a secondary oocyte in mature ovarian follicles. Unlike the sperm, the egg is arrested in the secondary stage of meiosis until fertilization.

Upon fertilization by sperm, the secondary oocyte continues the second part of meiosis and becomes a zygote.

== Clinical significance ==
Any ovarian follicle that is larger than about three centimeters is termed an ovarian cyst.

Ovarian function may be measured by gynecologic ultrasonography of follicular volume. Presently, ovarian follicle volumes can be measured rapidly and automatically from three-dimensionally reconstructed ultrasound images.

Rupture of the follicle can result in abdominal pain (mittelschmerz) and is to be considered in the differential diagnosis in people of childbearing age.

Ovarian tissue cryopreservation is of interest to people who want to preserve their reproductive function beyond the natural limit, or whose reproductive potential is threatened by cancer therapy, for example in hematologic malignancies or breast cancer.

For in vitro culture of follicles, there are various techniques to optimize the growth of follicles, including the use of defined media, growth factors and three-dimensional extracellular matrix support. Molecular methods and immunoassay can evaluate stage of maturation and guide adequate differentiation. Animal studies have generally shown correct imprinted DNA methylation establishment in oocytes resulting from follicle culture.

== Additional images ==
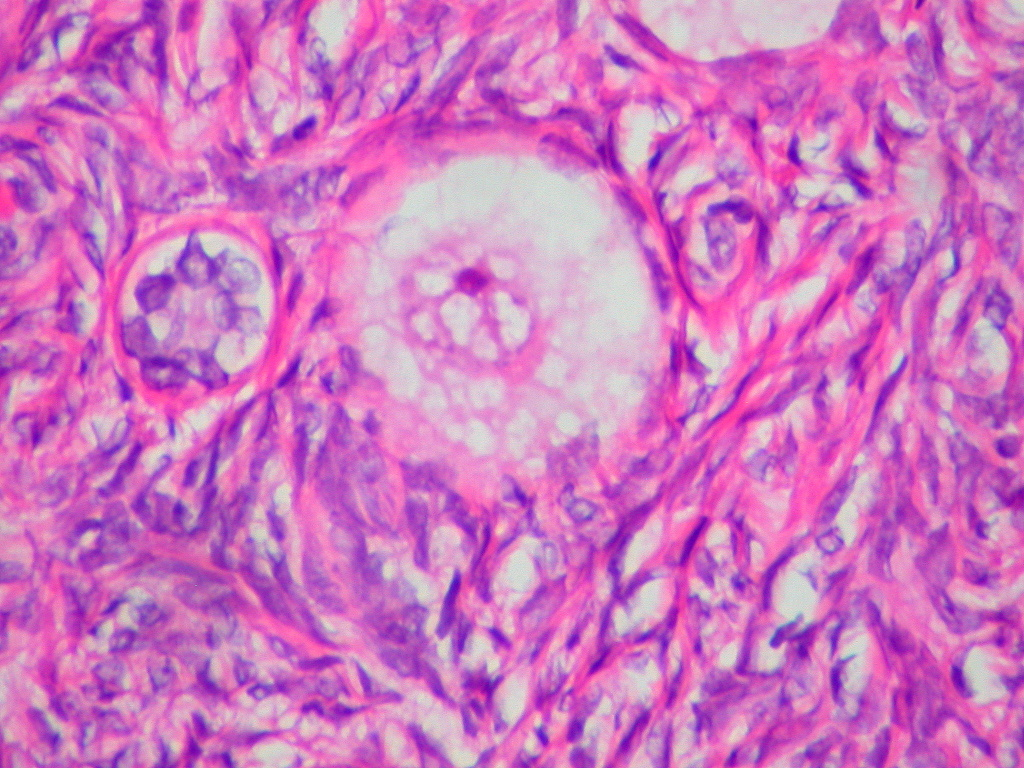
Primordial ovarian follicle. The oocyte is surrounded by a single layer of flat granulosa cells.

== See also ==
- Antral follicle
