= Theca of follicle =

Layer of the ovarian follicles

Details

Identifiers
- Latin: theca folliculi

The theca of follicule or follicular theca, develops as an outer layer of the ovarian follicle when the primary follicle becomes a late primary follicle. As the follicle becomes a secondary follicle, the theca divides into an internal and external layer, (theca interna, and theca externa). The theca interna consists of an inner layer of secretory cells. The theca externa is an outer fibrous capsule. Theca cells are a group of endocrine cells surrounding the ovarian follicle, made up of stromal connective tissue. Their functions include promoting folliculogenesis and recruiting a single follicle during ovulation.

== Theca interna ==
Theca interna cells express receptors for luteinizing hormone (LH) to produce androstenedione (an androgen), which via a few steps, gives the granulosa cells the precursor for estrogen manufacturing.

After rupture of the mature ovarian follicle, the theca interna cells differentiate into the theca lutein cells of the corpus luteum, which continue to secrete androgens.

== Theca externa ==
The theca externa is the outer layer of the theca in the follicle. It is derived from connective tissue, the cells resemble fibroblasts, and contain abundant collagen. During ovulation, the surge in luteinizing hormone (LH surge) increases cAMP which increases progesterone and PGF2α production. PGF2α induces the contraction of the smooth muscle cells of the theca externa, increasing intrafollicular pressure. This aids in the formation of the ovarian stigma by weakening the ovarian surface allowing the follicle to rupture and release the egg cell.

== Androgen synthesis ==
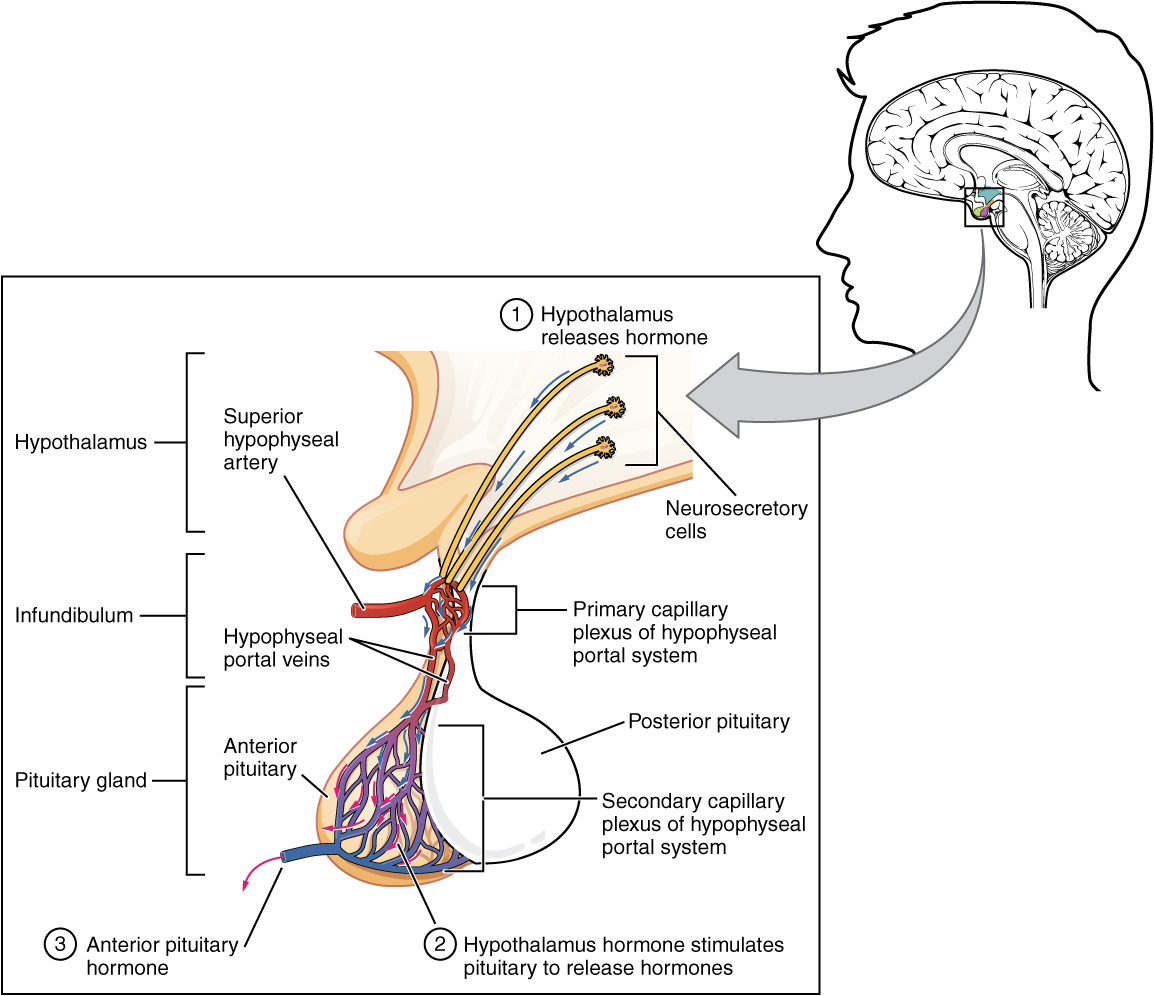
The anterior pituitary complex and hypophyseal portal system, where FSH and LH are released.

Theca cells are responsible for synthesizing androgens, providing signal transduction between granulosa cells and oocytes during development by the establishment of a vascular system, providing nutrients, and providing structure and support to the follicle as it matures.

Theca cells are responsible for the production of androstenedione, which is supplied to the neighboring granulosa cells where it is converted into estrone (a weak estrogen) by the enzyme aromatase, and then further converted into estradiol (a strong estrogen) by the enzyme 17β-HSD1. FSH stimulates granulosa cells to synthesize aromatase and 17β-HSD, which is necessary for this process.

=== Signaling cascade ===
Gonadotropin releasing hormone (GnRH) is released by projections of the hypothalamus into the anterior pituitary gland. Gonadotrophs are stimulated to produce follicle-stimulating hormone (FSH) and luteinizing hormone (LH), which are released into the bloodstream to act upon the ovaries. Luteinizing hormone serves to directly stimulate theca cells. Together, these organs comprise the hypothalamic–pituitary–gonadal axis (HPG axis).

Within the ovaries, the LH receptor (a G protein-coupled receptor) binds to LH in the bloodstream, and the signal is transduced to the interior of theca cells through the action of the second messenger cAMP and third messenger protein kinase A (PKA). Theca cells are then stimulated to produce the androgen, androstenedione, which is sent in a paracrine fashion to neighboring granulosa cells for conversion into estrone and eventually estradiol.

== Folliculogenesis ==
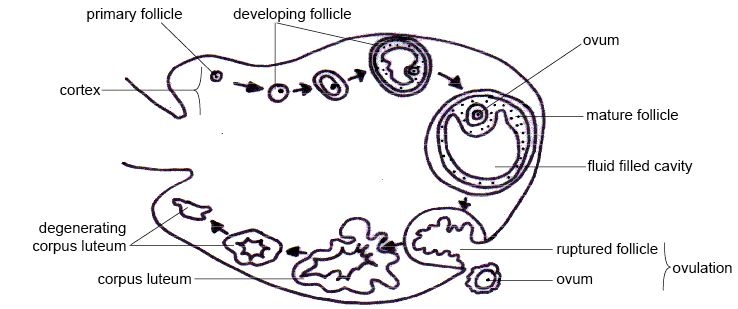
A depiction of the ovarian cycle in animals

In human adult females, the primordial follicle is composed of a single oocyte surrounded by a layer of closely associated granulosa cells. In early stages of the ovarian cycle, the developing follicle acquires a layer of connective tissue and associated blood vessels. This covering is called the theca.

As development of the secondary follicle progresses, granulosa cells proliferate to form the multilayered membrana granulosum. Over a period of months, the granulosa cells and thecal cells secrete follicular fluid (a mixture of hormones, enzymes, and anticoagulants) to nourish the maturing ovum.

In tertiary follicles, the single-layered theca differentiates into a theca interna and theca externa. The theca interna contains glandular cells and many small blood vessels, while the theca externa is composed of dense connective tissue and larger blood vessels.

== Disorders ==
Hyperactivity of theca cells causes hyperandrogenism, and hypoactivity leads to a lack of estrogen. Granulosa cell tumors, while rare (less than 5% of ovarian cancers), may occur in both granulosa cells and theca cells. Thecomas are benign proliferations of theca cells that may present with hormonal dysfunction.

Dysfunction in theca cells is one of the leading cause of endocrine-based infertility, as either hyperactivity or hypoactivity of the theca cells can lead to fertility problems.

== See also ==
- Polyendocrine metabolic ovarian syndrome
- Dehydroepiandrosterone sulfate
