= CPEB =

Protein

Cytoplasmic polyadenylation element binding protein
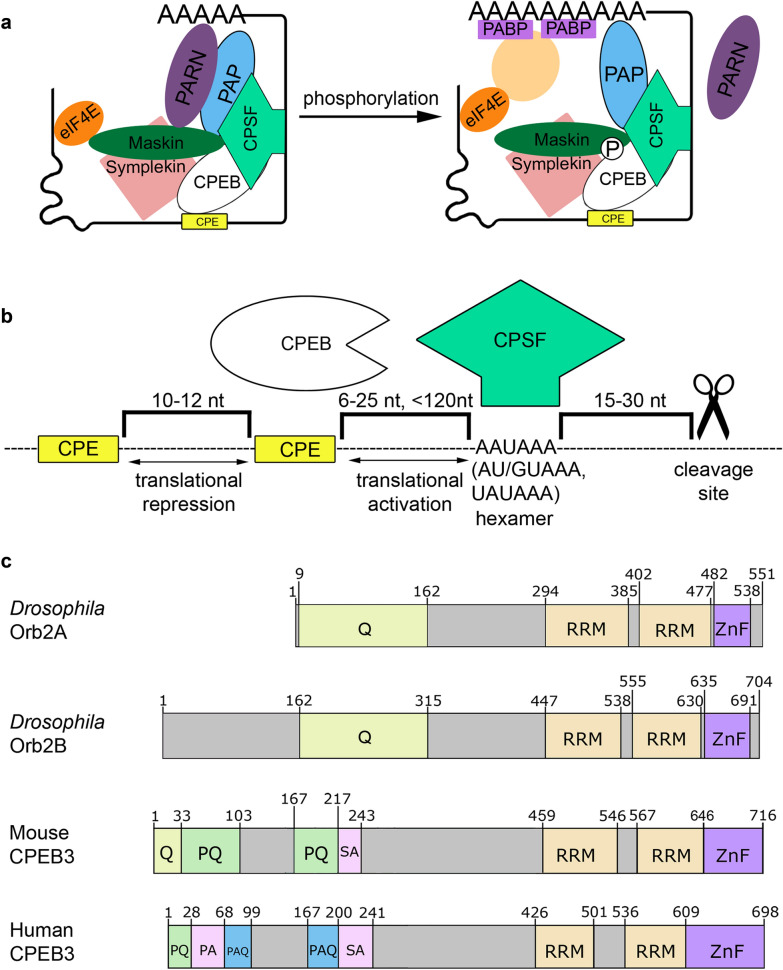
- Properties of CPEBs and their interactions with other proteins in RNP complexes

Identifiers
- Symbol: CPEB
- Pfam: PF16366
- InterPro: IPR034819
Available protein structures:
- PDB: IPR034819 PF16366 (ECOD; PDBsum)
- AlphaFold: IPR034819; PF16366

CPEB, or cytoplasmic polyadenylation element binding protein, is a highly conserved RNA-binding protein that promotes the elongation of the polyadenine tail of messenger RNA. CPEB is present at postsynaptic sites and dendrites where it stimulates polyadenylation and translation in response to synaptic activity. CPEB most commonly activates the target RNA for translation, but can also act as a repressor, dependent on its phosphorylation state. As a repressor, CPEB interacts with the deadenylation complex and shortens the polyadenine tail of mRNAs. In animals, CPEB is expressed in several alternative splicing isoforms that are specific to particular tissues and functions, including the self-cleaving Mammalian CPEB3 ribozyme. CPEB was first identified in Xenopus oocytes and associated with meiosis; a role has also been identified in the spermatogenesis of Caenorhabditis elegans.

CPEB is involved in closed-loop regulation of mRNAs that keeps them inactive. The closed-loop structure between the 3'UTR and 5'UTR inhibits translation. This has been observed in Xenopus laevis in which eIF4E bound to the 5' cap interacts with Maskin bound to CPEB on the 3' UTR creating translationally inactive transcripts. This translational inhibition is lifted once CPEB is phosphorylated, displacing the Maskin binding site, allowing for the polymerization of the PolyA tail, which can recruit the translational machinery by means of PABP. However, is important to note that this mechanism has been under great scrutiny.

CPEB has been shown to shuttle between the nucleus and cytoplasm. In the nuclei of different organisms, it was found that CPEB helps guide the path of mRNA in the cytoplasm. CPEB was found to be almost exclusively in the c plasm in stage VI Xenopus oocytes. However, a further study on this topic found that there is a substantial amount of CPEB in the nucleus. CPEB can bind with CPE-containing mRNAs in the nucleus, which forces tight translational regulation in the cytoplasm. CPEBs bound to these mRNAs were found to have a lower translation efficiency, which is indicative of the translation regulation.

== Protein Family ==
CPEB can also refer to the family of proteins. There are four proteins in the protein family:

- CPEB1
- CPEB2
- CPEB3
- CPEB4

This protein family can be divided into two subfamilies. The groups are separated by their ..specific properties in target/motif recognition, large-order complex co-factors, and dynamic properties and regulation during cell cycle." The first subfamily contains only CPEB1 and the second contains CPEB2 - CPEB4. The general CPE that CPEBs bind to has a canonical UUUUAU sequence, which all four of the proteins can recognize. However, CPEB1 can only recognize CPEs with the canonical sequence, while the second group of CPEB2–4 can also bind to variants of the CPE, known as G-variants due to their sequence difference (UUUUGU). This suggests that CPEB2–4 has other targets that it can hit in addition to CPEB1 targets.

== Structure ==
The CPEB structure consists of "...an amino-terminal port with no obvious functional motif, two RNA recognition motifs (RRMS), and a cysteine-histidine region that is reminiscent of a zinc finger." The zinc finger region and RRMs are necessary for RNA bind. It was found that CPEB bound to other metals than zinc destroyed RNA binding, but the binding would be restored if supplemented with zinc. Proteins lacking any of the RRMs were also shown to be less efficient in binding RNA.

Not all of the regions are the same across the different forms of CPEB. The amino terminus can differ substantially across the proteins. The prion-like isoform of CPEB found in Aplysia californica, Drosophila, mice, and humans is an example of such differentiation. This isoform is prion-like due to the presence of polyglutamine- or polyalanine-rich domains at the N-terminus.

== Neurological disorders ==
A misstep in the process of translation with CPEB can lead to possible adverse affects on neurological development. Risk genes for autism spectrum disorder were found in brains where "...CPEB4 transcript isoform imbalance due to decreased inclusion of a neuronal-specific microexon together with a new molecular signature of global polyadenine tail shortening..." In idiopathic autism spectrum disorder individuals, CPEB4 is greatly decreased and showed significant splicing alterations. An equivalent isoform imbalance in mice mimics changes of autism spectrum disorder genes, which causes similar neuroanatomical, electrophysiological, and behavioral phenotype expression.

Gene regulation of CPEB proteins is also proposed as a target for gene therapy.. Fragile X syndrome and Huntington's disease are two such disorders and diseases where CPEB regulation has been used to attempt recovery of brain function. There is not a cure for either of these afflictions, but translation dysfunction of CPEB proteins can be a cause for either. When modeling fragile X syndrome in mice, CPEB1 gene mutations reduced pathological processes associated with the disorder. A decrease in CPEB1 restored the balance of mRNA translation, which can be achieved by manipulating levels of miRNAs.

For Huntington's disease, a study on a Drosophila cell culture showed that the Drosophila Orb2A protein was absorbed on the surface of Huntingtin gene (Htt) aggregates. The aggregates lead to a protein synthesis imbalance, cell decay, and neuron death. The absorption of the protein caused a partial reduction of the lethality of the Htt aggregates. The aggregates did not decrease, but protein synthesis balance was restored in the cells. However, CPEB sequestration translation dysfunction is not a definite cause of Huntington's disease symptoms in humans. Other RNA binding proteins could be other possible targets for translation dysfunction in patients with this disease.

== Role in cellular senescence ==
CPEB has been found to help regulate cellular senescence through modulating p53 mRNA polyadenylation-induced translation. When human skin and lung cells were put under a knockdown of CPEB, they bypassed the M1 crisis stage of senescence. This bypass is required for cellular transformation. Reduced CPEB levels also affected the rate at which cell division occurred, slowing down the process until the cells ceased to divide. In mice, reduced CPEB levels caused cells to become immortal. A senescence-like phenotype recurred when CPEB was introduced into early passage cells, but not late passage cells. Senescence is considered an irreversible process, but the CPEB-induced senescence-like phenotype can possibly refute that. CPEB is thus shown to regulate senescence, as well as mediate immortalization in cells.

== Role in memory ==
Drosophila Orb2 binds to genes implicated in long-term memory. An isoform of CPEB found in the neurons of the sea slug Aplysia californica, as well as in Drosophila, mice, and humans, contains an N-terminal domain not found in other isoforms that shows high sequence similarity to prion proteins. Experiments with the Aplysia isoform expressed in yeast reveal that CPEB has a key property associated with prions: it can cause other proteins to assume alternate protein conformations that are heritable in successive generations of yeast cells. Furthermore, the functional RNA-binding form of the CPEB protein may be the prion-like state. These observations have led to the suggestion that long-lasting bistable prionlike proteins play a role in the formation of long-term memory. It has been suggested that "both memory storage and its underlying synaptic plasticity are mediated by the increase in. . .CPEB."

== Role in oogenesis and embryonic development ==
CPEBs are responsible for the polyadenine tail length in oocytes during oogenesis. In Xenopus and mice oocytes, CPEB has been noted to control oocyte growth. Regulation of follicle development has been noted specifically in mice. CPEB regulates oocyte development and follicle development in the dictyate stage through phosphorylation and dephosphorylation. During pachytene, CPEB is phosphorylated, which controls polyadenylation and translation of mRNAs. An experiment was conducted to determine how CPEB affected development by inhibiting the protein in mice. It was found that CPEB regulates Gdf9, a growth factor necessary for follicle development. Without CPEB, Gdf9 had a shortened polyadenine tail and reduced expression. It was also found that progressive oocyte loss and infertility arose from the knockdown of CPEB in oocytes, which resembles premature ovarian failure syndrome in humans.

== Interactions ==
CPEB has been shown to interact with the following proteins:

- PUM2
- PARN
- GLD-2
- symplekin
- eIF4E binding protein
