= Resumption of meiosis =

Resumption of meiosis occurs as a part of oocyte meiosis after meiotic arrest has occurred. In females, meiosis of an oocyte begins during embryogenesis and will be completed after puberty. A primordial follicle will arrest, allowing the follicle to grow in size and mature. Resumption of meiosis will resume following an ovulatory surge (ovulation) of luteinising hormone (LH).

== Meiotic arrest ==
Meiosis was initially discovered by Oscar Hertwig in 1876 as he examined the fusion of the gametes in sea urchin eggs. In 1890, August Weismann, concluded that two different rounds of meiosis are required and defined the difference between somatic cells and germ cells.

Studies regarding meiotic arrest and resumption have been difficult to attain because, within females, the oocyte is inaccessible. The majority of research was conducted by removing the follicles and artificially maintaining the oocyte in meiotic arrest. Despite this allowing the gain of knowledge on meiosis in oocytes, the results of this methodology may be difficult to interpret and apply to humans.

During oogenesis, meiosis arrests twice. The main arrest occurs during the diplotene stage of prophase 1, this arrest lasts until puberty. The second meiotic arrest then occurs after ovulation during metaphase 2 and lasts for a much shorter time than the first arrest. Meiotic arrest occurs mainly due to increased cAMP levels in the oocyte, which regulates key regulator cyclin kinase complex maturation promoting factor (MPF). cGMPs produced by somatic follicular cells further regulate cAMP concentration in the oocyte.

== Meiotic resumption in mammals ==
Meiotic resumption is visually manifested as “germinal vesicle breakdown” (GVBD), referring to the primary oocyte nucleus. GVBD is the process of nuclear envelope dissolution and chromosome condensation similar to mitotic prophase.

In females, the process of folliculogenesis begins during fetal development. Folliculogenesis is the maturation of ovarian follicles. Primordial germ-cells (PGC’S) undergo meiosis leading to the formation of primordial follicles. At birth, meiosis arrests at the diplotene phase of prophase I. Oocytes will remain in this state until the time of puberty. At the time of ovulation a surge of LH initiates the resumption of meiosis and oocytes enter the second cycle, which is known as oocyte maturation. Meiosis is then arrested again during metaphase 2 until fertilisation. At fertilisation meiosis then resumes which results in the disassociation from the 2nd polar body, meaning maturation of the oocyte is now complete.

== Meiotic resumption signalling ==
=== Cyclic adenosine monophosphate levels (cAMP) ===
Elevated concentrations of intra-oocyte cAMP regulates meiotic arrest and prevents meiotic resumption. Intracellular cAMP constantly activates PKA, which then activates nuclear kinase Weel/MtyI. Weel/Mtyl inhibits cell division cycle 25B (CDC25B) which is a main activator for Cyclin-dependent kinase (CDK). This leads to the inactivation of maturation promoting factor (MPF) as MPF comprises CDK and Cyclin B.

MPF is an essential regulator for M-phase transition and plays a key role in meiotic resumption in oocytes and its post-GVBD activities. Hence, a high level of cAMP indirectly inactivates MPF, preventing meiotic resumption.

=== GPCR3-Gs-ADCY Cascade ===
The production of cAMP is maintained by the intra-oocyte GPCR-GS-ADCY cascade.

Inhibition of Gs protein in mouse oocyte leads to meiotic resumption. Gs protein-coupled receptor 3 (GPCR3) KO mice was found to present with spontaneous meiotic resumption as well, which was preventable with the administration of GPCR3 RNA into the oocyte. GPCR3 can be found to be present in the oocyte membrane and functions to sustain a minimal level of cAMP, preventing meiotic resumption.

In the oocyte, the effector enzyme of GPR is adencylate cyclase (ADCY). It acts as a catalyst converting adenosine triphosphate (ATP) to cAMP, maintaining cAMP levels within the oocyte, preventing meiotic resumption.

=== Somatic follicular cells and cyclic guanosine monophosphate (cGMP) ===
The removal of oocyte from the follicle results in spontaneous meiotic resumption which implicates the role of somatic follicular cells in meiotic arrest.

cGMP is produced by guanylyl cyclase present the granulosa cells, in particular, natriuretic peptide receptor 2 (NPR2) and natriuretic peptide precursor-C (NPPC) that can be found in the cumulus and mural granulosa cells respectively (in mice, pigs and human).

cGMP produced by these granulosa cells rapidly diffuse into the oocyte through gap junctions and inhibits cAMP-phosphodiesterase 3A (cAMP-PDE3A). cAMP-PDE3A functions as a catalyst for the breakdown of cAMP to AMP within the oocyte. Hence, somatic follicular cells produce cGMP inhibit cell resumption via maintain intra-oocyte cAMP levels.

=== Inosine 5’ monophosphate (IMP) dehydrogenase (IMPDH) ===
Previous studies have demonstrated that treatment of mouse oocytes with IMPDH inhibitors induced gonadotropin-independent meiotic resumption in vivo.

IMPDH is a rate limiting enzyme that catalyses IMP to xanthosine monophosphate (XMP). It can induce meiotic resumption as XMP produced is ultimately converted to cGMP through a series of enzymatic activities.

In addition, IMPDH maintains hypoxanthine (HX) levels in the follicular fluid. The HX concentration inhibits cAMP-PDE activity in vitro.

=== Lutensing Hormone (LH) ===
It is commonly known that monthly surge of preovulatory LH from the pituitary gland promotes meiotic resumption.

First, LH signaling dephosphorylates and inactivates NPR2 guanylyl cyclase. This results in a rapid decrease in cGMP levels in the granulosa cells and the oocytes through the gap junctions. PDE5 is also activated, increasing cGMP hydrolysis. In mouse follicles, the concentration of cGMP drops from ~2-5 μM to ~100nM within a minute from exposure to LH.

The decreasing cGMP concentration occurs in a sequential fashion, from the mural granulosa cells, the cumulus granulosa cells and finally the oocyte. The diffusion of cGMP out of the oocyte promotes meiotic resumption. It proposed that the diffusion of cGMP away from the oocyte occurs before LH-induced closure of gap junctions between somatic cells, could be an “augment step to further guarantee a low level of cGMP within the oocyte or cumulus granulosa”.

It is also believed that LH-induced cGMP decrease in granulosa cells is only part of the mechanism, with the full mechanism remaining unexplained.
