= Immature ovum =

An immature ovum is a cell that goes through the process of oogenesis to become an ovum. It can be an oogonium, an oocyte, or an ootid. An oocyte, in turn, can be either primary or secondary, depending on how far it has come in its process of meiosis.

Cell type	ploidy/chromosomes	chromatids	Process	Process completion
Oogonium	diploid/46	2C	Oocytogenesis (mitosis)	third trimester
primary Oocyte	diploid/46	4C	Ootidogenesis (meiosis 1) (Folliculogenesis) -- polar body separated	Dictyate in prophase I until ovulation
secondary Oocyte	haploid/23	2C	Ootidogenesis (meiosis 2) -- polar body separated	Halted in metaphase II until fertilization
Ootid	haploid/23	1C	Maturation	Minutes after fertilization
Ovum	haploid/23	1C		

== Oogonium ==
Oogonia are the cells that turn into primary oocytes in oogenesis. They are diploid.

Oogonia are created in early embryonic life. All have turned into primary oocytes at late fetal age.

== Primary oocyte ==
The primary oocyte is defined by its process of ootidogenesis, which is meiosis. It has duplicated its DNA, so that each chromosome has two chromatids, i.e. 92 chromatids all in all (4C).

When meiosis I is completed, one secondary oocyte and one polar body is created.

Primary oocytes have been created in late fetal life. This is the stage where immature ova spend most of their lifetime, more specifically in diplotene of prophase I of meiosis. The halt is called dictyate. Most degenerate by atresia, but a few go through ovulation, and that's the trigger to the next step. Thus, an immature ovum can spend up to ~55 years as a primary oocyte (the last ovulation before menopause).

== Secondary oocyte ==
The secondary oocyte is the cell that is formed by meiosis I in oogenesis. Thus, it has only one of each pair of homologous chromosomes. In other words, it is haploid. However, each chromosome still has two chromatids, making a total of 46 chromatids (1N but 2C). The secondary oocyte continues the second stage of meiosis (meiosis II), and the daughter cells are one ootid and one polar body.

Secondary oocytes are the immature ovum shortly after ovulation, to fertilization, where it turns into an ootid. Thus, the time as a secondary oocyte is measured in days.

== Ootid ==
An ootid is the haploid result of ootidogenesis. In oogenesis, it doesn't really have any significance in itself, since it is very similar to the ovum. However, it fills the purpose as the female counterpart of the male spermatid in spermatogenesis.

Each chromosome is split between the two ootids, leaving only one chromatid per chromosome. Thus, there are 23 chromatids in total (1N).

== Ovum ==
The ootid matures into an ovum.
