= Maskin =

Maskin may refer to

- A certain molecule in biochemistry, for which see Dictyate#Biochemistry mechanism.
- Aaron Maskin, an Israeli stage actor and recipient of the Israel Prize.
- Battle of Maskin, a battle of the Second Muslim Civil War in present-day Iraq
- Eric Maskin, a 2007 Nobel laureate in Economics.
- Maskin is also the Swedish, Danish and Norwegian word for Machine.
