= MARF1 =

Protein-coding gene in the species Homo sapiens

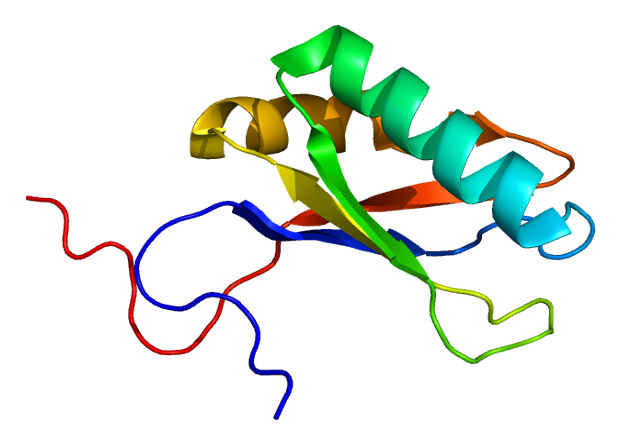

Identifiers
- Aliases: MARF1, LKAP, PPP1R34, KIAA0430, LMKB, meiosis regulator and mRNA stability factor 1
- External IDs: OMIM: 614593; MGI: 2444505; GeneCards: MARF1
Available structures
PDB	Ortholog search: PDBe RCSB
PDB	List of PDB id codes 2DGX, 2DIU

Gene location (Human)
Chr.	Chromosome 16 (human)
Band	16p13.11	Start	15,594,387 bp
Band	16p13.11	End	15,643,154 bp

Gene location (Mouse)
Chr.	Chromosome 16 (mouse)
Band	16|16 A1	Start	13,927,037 bp
Band	16|16 A1	End	13,981,215 bp
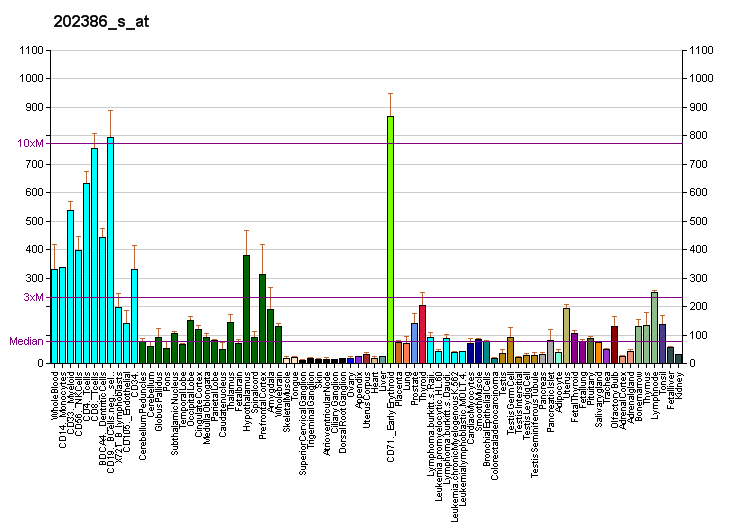
RNA expression pattern
Bgee	Human / Mouse (ortholog); Top expressed in: epithelium of colon; bone marrow cell; blood; tonsil; superior frontal gyrus; monocyte; dorsolateral prefrontal cortex; Brodmann area 9; gastric mucosa; anterior cingulate cortex / Top expressed in: zygote; aortic valve; ascending aorta; supraoptic nucleus; medial vestibular nucleus; mammillary body; lateral septal nucleus; Rostral migratory stream; interventricular septum; ventromedial nucleus; More reference expression data
BioGPS	More reference expression data
Gene ontology
Molecular function	RNA binding; nucleic acid binding; molecular function
Cellular component	peroxisome; membrane; Golgi apparatus; intracellular membrane-bounded organelle
Biological process	negative regulation of phosphatase activity; regulation of gene expression; cell differentiation; meiosis; female meiotic nuclear division; double-strand break repair; oogenesis
Sources:Amigo / QuickGO
Orthologs
Databases	NCBI: entry; OMA: entry
Species	Human	Mouse
Entrez	9665	223989
Ensembl	ENSG00000166783; ENSG00000277140	ENSMUSG00000060657
UniProt	Q9Y4F3	Q8BJ34
RefSeq (mRNA)	NM_001184998; NM_001184999; NM_014647; NM_019081	NM_001081154
RefSeq (protein)	NP_001171927; NP_001171928; NP_055462	NP_001074623
Location (UCSC)	Chr 16: 15.59 – 15.64 Mb	Chr 16: 13.93 – 13.98 Mb
PubMed search
- Wikidata
View/Edit Human	View/Edit Mouse

Meiosis regulator and mRNA stability factor 1 is a protein that in humans is encoded by the MARF1 gene (previously KIAA0430). The MARF1 protein is predicted to be involved in female meiosis and oogenesis.
