= Hovlinc =

- Consensus secondary structure and sequence conservation of Hovlinc ribozyme (hominin vlincRNA-located)

Identifiers
- Symbol: Hovlinc
- Rfam: RF04188

Other data
- RNA type: Gene; Ribozyme
- Domain: Hominidae
- GO: GO:0003824
- SO: SO:0000374
- PDB structures: PDBe

Hovlinc RNA is a self-cleaving ribozyme of about 168 nucleotides found in a very long noncoding RNA (vlincRNA) in humans, chimpanzees, and gorillas. The word "hovlinc" comes from "hominin vlincRNA-located" RNA. Hovlinc is only a fourth known case of a ribozyme in human. Self-cleavage activity of Hovlinc has been shown in human, chimpanzees and bonobos, but is absent in gorillas, raising questions about Hovlinc's biological function and evolution.

There are only a few known examples of ribozymes in human, including Hovlinc, Mammalian CPEB3 ribozyme, Hammerhead ribozyme (HH9 and HH10) and B2 SINE ribozyme. Presumably Hovlinc acquired its self-cleaving activity about 10 to 13 million of years ago, which coincides with the last common ancestor of humans, gorillas, and chimpanzees. Hovlinc presents catalytic activity in hominids but not in gorillas where a mutation abolished the self-cleavage activity.

Hovlinc is a very structured RNA that contains four stem loops joined in a central loop, it also features large pseudoknots that help to bring together the second and fourth helices, which helps the RNA to get the more compacted structure that allows catalytic activity.
