= Polar cell =

Polar cell may refer to:

- Polar cells, a constituent of atmospheric circulation
- Polar body, a smaller cell by-product of egg formation in some animal species
