= GLD-2 =

Protein-coding gene in the species Homo sapiens

TENT2
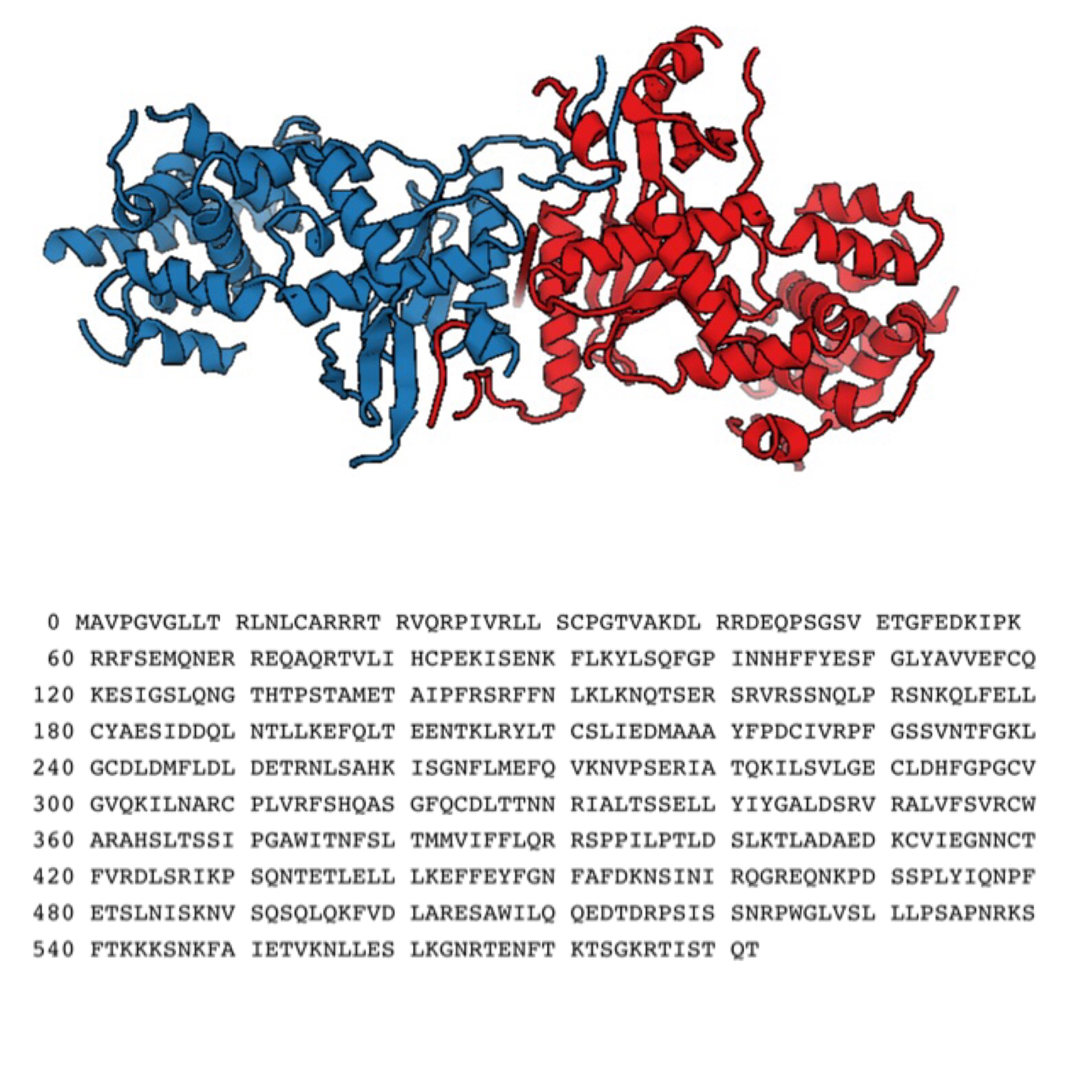

Identifiers
- Aliases: TENT2, GLD2, TUT2, PAP associated domain containing 4, poly(A) RNA polymerase D4, non-canonical, PAPD4, terminal nucleotidyltransferase 2, APD4, GLD-2
- External IDs: OMIM: 614121; MGI: 2140950; GeneCards: TENT2
Enzyme activity
EC #	BRENDA	ExPASy	KEGG	MetaCyc
2.7.7.19	↗	↗	↗	↗

Gene location (Human)
Chr.	Chromosome 5 (human)
Band	5q14.1	Start	79,612,120 bp
Band	5q14.1	End	79,686,648 bp
RNA expression pattern
Bgee	Human / Mouse (ortholog); Top expressed in: Achilles tendon; secondary oocyte; corpus epididymis; caput epididymis; tail of epididymis; epithelium of colon; thymus; monocyte; corpus callosum; sural nerve / n/a; More reference expression data
BioGPS	n/a
Gene ontology
Molecular function	transferase activity; nucleotide binding; polynucleotide adenylyltransferase activity; protein binding; ATP binding; metal ion binding; 5'-3' RNA polymerase activity; adenylyltransferase activity
Cellular component	nuclear RNA-directed RNA polymerase complex; cytoplasm; cytosol; nucleus
Biological process	histone mRNA catabolic process; mRNA processing; RNA polyadenylation; hematopoietic progenitor cell differentiation; hippocampus development; neuron differentiation; retina development in camera-type eye; dark adaptation; RNA stabilization; negative regulation of miRNA catabolic process
Sources:Amigo / QuickGO
Orthologs
Databases	NCBI: entry; OMA: entry
Species	Human	Mouse
Entrez	167153	100715
Ensembl	ENSG00000164329	n/a
UniProt	Q6PIY7	Q91YI6
RefSeq (mRNA)	NM_001114393; NM_001114394; NM_001297744; NM_001297745; NM_173797 NM_001349548; NM_001349549; NM_001349550; NM_001349551; NM_001349552; NM_001349553; NM_001349554	NM_133905; NM_001361536; NM_001361537
RefSeq (protein)	NP_001107865; NP_001107866; NP_001284673; NP_001284674; NP_776158 NP_001336477; NP_001336478; NP_001336479; NP_001336480; NP_001336481; NP_001336482; NP_001336483	NP_598666; NP_001348465; NP_001348466
Location (UCSC)	Chr 5: 79.61 – 79.69 Mb	n/a
PubMed search
- Wikidata
View/Edit Human	View/Edit Mouse

GLD-2 (which stands for Germ Line Development 2) is an enzyme which in humans is encoded by the gene TENT2. More specifically, it is a cytoplasmic poly(A) polymerase (cytoPAPs) which adds successive AMP monomers to the 3’ end of specific RNAs, forming a poly(A) tail, which is a process known as polyadenylation.

For RNA specificity, GLD-2 associates with an RNA-binding protein, typically a GLD-3, to form a heterodimer that acts as a cytoplasmic PAP. This protein has an enzymatic function and belongs to a family (DNA polymerase type-B-like family) which includes several similar enzymes such as GLD-1, GLD-3 and GLD-4.

This family of cytoplasmic PAPs has been described in several different species including Homo sapiens, Caenorhabditis elegans, Xenopus, Mus musculus and Drosophila. Moreover, as it is a cytoplasmtaic PAP it differs from nuclear PAPs in some aspects. While nuclear PAPs contain a catalytic domain and an RNA-binding domain, GLD-2 family members have only a catalytic domain.

== Localization ==
GLD-2 is a common and abundant, but yet quite unknown protein that has already been found in each of the five kingdoms. In the animal kingdom, it has been specially detected in Homo sapiens, Drosophila, Xenopus and Mus musculus. However, there has also been noticed the presence of GLD-2 in Arabidopsis thaliana which belongs in the plants kingdom; Escherichia Coli in monera and Candida albicans in fungi.

In human beings it is mostly expressed in the brain and within it, in the cerebellum, hippocampus and medulla. They can also be found in other source tissues such as the fibroblast, HeLa cell, MCF-7 cell, melanoma cell line and thymus. Inside those cells, it can be located in the nucleus and mitochondrion since its main function is related with DNA polyadenilation and these cell organelles are the only ones were DNA can be found. However, there are also GLD-2 in a soluble way in the cytosol; the reason for their presence is still unsure.

In Escherichia Coli, this enzymatic protein can be found in the cell membrane and in the cytosol, whereas in Drosophila melanogaster, it predominates in the brain's nucleus and cytoplasm, oocyte, ovary and testis’ cells. Finally, in the Arabidopsis thaliana, it is located in the flower's nucleus, root, stem and leaf cells.

== Related functions ==
GLD-2 primarily stabilizes mRNAs that are translationally repressed as well as it strongly promotes bulk polyadenylation. Surprisingly, those functions seem to have little impact on dynamizing efficient target mRNA translation, as it is an efficient Poly(A) Polymerase which helps developing polyadenylation activity. This activity is stimulated by its interaction with a putative RNA-binding protein: GLD-3. It is proposed by some studies that GLD-3 stimulates GLD-2 by recruiting it to the RNA. If so, then bringing GLD-2 to the RNA by other means also should stimulate its activity.

=== Molecular function ===
==== ATP binding ====
GLD-2, as a poly(A) polymerase (PAP) acts incorporating ATP at the 3' end of mRNAs in a template-independent manner.

==== Enzymatic activity: Polynucleotide adenylyltransferase activity ====
It has been discovered that this protein has a catalytic activity, in other words, it has the ability to increase the speed of chemical reactions which would not occur so fast. It is known to catalysis the following reaction (which requires the following cofactor: Mg(2+)):

                            ATP + RNA(n)  ⇄  diphosphate  +  RNA(n+1)

Depending on the surroundings the optimal pH varies from 8 in the cytoplasm to 8.3 in the nucleus.

=== Biological process ===
==== Hematopoietic progenitor cell differentiation ====
The GLD-2 protein together with 136 proteins more, is involved in the molecular process of hematopoietic progenitor cell differentiation, in the human proteome. This is the process in which precursor cell type acquires the specialized features of a hematopoietic progenitor cell, a kind of cell types including myeloid progenitor cells and lymphoid progenitor cells.

==== mRNA processing by RNA polyadenylation ====
The polyadenylation activity of GLD-2, as we previously mentioned, is stimulated by physical interaction with an RNA binding protein, GLD-3. To test whether GLD-3 might stimulate GLD-2 by recruiting it to RNA, some studies tethered C. elegans GLD-2 to mRNAs in Xenopus oocytes by using MS2 coat protein. Tethered GLD-2 adds poly(A) and stimulates translation of the mRNA, demonstrating that recruitment is sufficient to stimulate polyadenylation activity. PAP heterodimer in which GLD-2 contains the active site and GLD-3 provides RNA-binding specificity. MS2 coat protein was joined to GLD-2 to recruit it to an RNA.

Furthermore, GLD-2 activity is also important to maintain or up-regulate the abundance of many mRNAs, as the cytoplasmic polyadenylation has an essential role in activating maternal mRNA translation during early development. In vertebrates, the reaction requires CPEB, an RNA-binding protein and the poly(A) polymerase GLD-2.

The Xenopus enzyme, which exists in two closely related forms, polyadenylates RNAs to which it is tethered and enhances their translation. Likewise, it interacts with cytoplasmic polyadenylation factors, including Cleavage and polyadenylation specificity factor and CPEB, and with target mRNAs. These findings confirm and extend a recent report that a GLD-2 enzyme is the long-sought PAP responsible for cytoplasmic polyadenylation in oocytes.

In addition, the formation of long-term memory is believed to lack translational control of localized mRNAs. In mammals, dendrite mRNAs are kept in a repressed state and are activated upon repetitive stimulation. Several regulatory proteins required for translational control in early development are thought to be needed for memory formation, suggesting similar molecular mechanisms. In an experiment using Drosophila, it has been detected the enzyme responsible for poly(A) elongation in the brain and it has been demonstrated too that its activity is required specifically for long-term memory. These findings provide strong evidence that cytoplasmic polyadenylation is critical for memory formation, and that GLD2 is the responsible enzyme.

== Medical implications ==
It has also been discovered that GLD2 has medical uses.

For example, such enzyme is overexpressed in patients who suffer from cancer; that's why it can be used as a prognostic factor for early appearance in breast cancer patients. Moreover, PAP activity is used to measure the effect of anticancer drugs as etoposide and cordycepin in two carcinoma cell lines: HeLa, which is the human epithelioid cervix carcinoma, and MCF-7 (human breast cancer). However, in spite its utilities it can also be involved in the expression of several common diseases such as: leukemia, liver cirrhosis, brain injuries, hepatitis and in some cases infertility in male patients.
