= Origin and function of meiosis =

Field of study in biology

The origin and function of meiosis are currently not well understood scientifically, and would provide fundamental insight into the evolution of sexual reproduction in eukaryotes. There is no current consensus among biologists on the questions of how sex in eukaryotes arose in evolution, what basic function sexual reproduction serves, and why it is maintained, given the basic two-fold cost of sex. It is clear that it evolved over 1.2 billion years ago, and that almost all species which are descendants of the original sexually reproducing species are still sexual reproducers, including plants, fungi, and animals.

Meiosis is a key event of the sexual cycle in eukaryotes. It is the stage of the life cycle when a cell gives rise to haploid cells (gametes) each having half as many chromosomes as the parental cell. Two such haploid gametes, ordinarily arising from different individual organisms, fuse by the process of fertilization, thus completing the sexual cycle.

Meiosis is ubiquitous among eukaryotes. It occurs in single-celled organisms such as yeast, as well as in multicellular organisms, such as humans. Eukaryotes arose from prokaryotes more than 2.2 billion years ago and the earliest eukaryotes were likely single-celled organisms. To understand sex in eukaryotes, it is necessary to understand (1) how meiosis arose in single celled eukaryotes, and (2) the function of meiosis.

== Origin of meiosis ==
There are two conflicting theories on how meiosis arose. One is that meiosis evolved from prokaryotic sex (bacterial recombination) as eukaryotes evolved from prokaryotes. The other is that meiosis arose from mitosis.

=== From prokaryotic sex ===
In prokaryotic sex, DNA from one prokaryote is taken up by another prokaryote and its information integrated into the DNA of the recipient prokaryote. In extant prokaryotes the donor DNA can be transferred either by transformation or conjugation. Transformation in which DNA from one prokaryote is released into the surrounding medium and then taken up by another prokaryotic cell may have been the earliest form of sexual interaction. One theory on how meiosis arose is that it evolved from transformation. According to this view, the evolutionary transition from prokaryotic sex to eukaryotic sex was continuous.

Transformation, like meiosis, is a complex process requiring the function of numerous gene products. A key similarity between prokaryotic sex and eukaryotic sex is that DNA originating from two different individuals (parents) join up so that homologous sequences are aligned with each other, and this is followed by exchange of genetic information (a process called genetic recombination). After the new recombinant chromosome is formed it is passed on to progeny.

When genetic recombination occurs between DNA molecules originating from different parents, the recombination process is catalyzed in prokaryotes and eukaryotes by enzymes that have similar functions and that are evolutionarily related. One of the most important enzymes catalyzing this process in bacteria is referred to as RecA, and this enzyme has two functionally similar counterparts that act in eukaryotic meiosis, RAD51 and DMC1.

Support for the theory that meiosis arose from prokaryotic transformation comes from the increasing evidence that early diverging lineages of eukaryotes have the core genes for meiosis. This implies that the precursor to meiosis was already present in the prokaryotic ancestor of eukaryotes. For instance the common intestinal parasite Giardia intestinalis, a simple eukaryotic protozoan was, until recently, thought to be descended from an early diverging eukaryotic lineage that lacked sex. However, it has since been shown that G. intestinalis contains within its genome a core set of genes that function in meiosis, including five genes that function only in meiosis. In addition, G. intestinalis was recently found to undergo a specialized, sex-like process involving meiosis gene homologs. This evidence, and other similar examples, suggest that a primitive form of meiosis, was present in the common ancestor of all eukaryotes, an ancestor that arose from an antecedent prokaryote.

=== From mitosis ===
Mitosis is the normal process in eukaryotes for cell division; duplicating chromosomes and segregating one of the two copies into each of the two daughter cells, in contrast with meiosis. The mitosis theory states that meiosis evolved from mitosis. According to this theory, early eukaryotes evolved mitosis first, became established, and only then did meiosis and sexual reproduction arise.

Supporting this idea are observations of some features, such as the meiotic spindles that draw chromosome sets into separate daughter cells upon cell division, as well as processes regulating cell division that employ the same, or similar molecular machinery. Yet there is no compelling evidence for a period in the early evolution of eukaryotes, during which meiosis and accompanying sexual capability did not yet exist.

In addition, as noted by Wilkins and Holliday, there are four novel steps needed in meiosis that are not present in mitosis. These are: (1) pairing of homologous chromosomes, (2) extensive recombination between homologs; (3) suppression of sister chromatid separation in the first meiotic division; and (4) avoiding chromosome replication during the second meiotic division. Although the introduction of these steps seems to be complicated, Wilkins and Holliday argue that only one new step, homolog synapsis, was particularly initiated in the evolution of meiosis from mitosis. Meanwhile, two of the other novel features could have been simple modifications, and extensive recombination could have evolved later.

=== Coevolution with mitosis ===
If meiosis arose from prokaryotic transformation, during the early evolution of eukaryotes, mitosis and meiosis could have evolved in parallel. Both processes use shared molecular components, where mitosis evolved from the molecular machinery used by prokaryotes for DNA replication and segregation, and meiosis evolved from the prokaryotic sexual process of transformation. However, meiosis also made use of the evolving molecular machinery for DNA replication and segregation.

== Function ==
=== Stress-induced sex ===
Abundant evidence indicates that facultative sexual eukaryotes tend to undergo sexual reproduction under stressful conditions. For instance, the budding yeast Saccharomyces cerevisiae (a single-celled fungus) reproduces mitotically (asexually) as diploid cells when nutrients are abundant, but switches to meiosis (sexual reproduction) under starvation conditions. The unicellular green alga, Chlamydomonas reinhardtii grows as vegetative cells in nutrient rich growth medium, but depletion of a source of nitrogen in the medium leads to gamete fusion, zygote formation and meiosis. The fission yeast Schizosaccharomyces pombe, treated with H_{2}O_{2} to cause oxidative stress, substantially increases the proportion of cells which undergo meiosis. The simple multicellular eukaryote Volvox carteri undergoes sex in response to oxidative stress or stress from heat shock. These examples, and others, suggest that, in simple single-celled and multicellular eukaryotes, meiosis is an adaptation to respond to stress.

Prokaryotic sex also appears to be an adaptation to stress. For instance, transformation occurs near the end of logarithmic growth, when amino acids become limiting in Bacillus subtilis, or in Haemophilus influenzae when cells are grown to the end of logarithmic phase. In Streptococcus mutans and other streptococci, transformation is associated with high cell density and biofilm formation. In Streptococcus pneumoniae, transformation is induced by the DNA damaging agent mitomycin C. These, and other, examples indicate that prokaryotic sex, like meiosis in simple eukaryotes, is an adaptation to stressful conditions. This observation suggests that the natural selection pressures maintaining meiosis in eukaryotes are similar to the selective pressures maintaining prokaryotic sex. This similarity suggests continuity, rather than a gap, in the evolution of sex from prokaryotes to eukaryotes.

Stress is, however, a general concept. What is it specifically about stress that needs to be overcome by meiosis? And what is the specific benefit provided by meiosis that enhances survival under stressful conditions?

=== DNA repair ===
In one theory, meiosis is primarily an adaptation for repairing DNA damage. Environmental stresses often lead to oxidative stress within the cell, which is well known to cause DNA damage through the production of reactive forms of oxygen, known as reactive oxygen species (ROS). DNA damages, if not repaired, can kill a cell by blocking DNA replication, or transcription of essential genes.

When only one strand of the DNA is damaged, the lost information (nucleotide sequence) can ordinarily be recovered by repair processes that remove the damaged sequence and fill the resulting gap by copying from the opposite intact strand of the double helix. However, ROS also cause a type of damage that is difficult to repair, referred to as double-strand damage. One common example of double-strand damage is the double-strand break. In this case, genetic information (nucleotide sequence) is lost from both strands in the damaged region, and proper information can only be obtained from another intact chromosome homologous to the damaged chromosome. The process that the cell uses to accurately accomplish this type of repair is called recombinational repair.

Meiosis is distinct from mitosis in that a central feature of meiosis is the alignment of homologous chromosomes followed by recombination between them. The two chromosomes which pair are referred to as non-sister chromosomes, since they did not arise simply from the replication of a parental chromosome. Recombination between non-sister chromosomes at meiosis is known to be a recombinational repair process that can repair double-strand breaks and other types of double-strand damage. In contrast, recombination between sister chromosomes cannot repair double-strand damages arising prior to the replication which produced them. Thus on this view, the adaptive advantage of meiosis is that it facilitates recombinational repair of DNA damage that is otherwise difficult to repair, and that occurs as a result of stress, particularly oxidative stress. If left unrepaired, this damage would likely be lethal to gametes and inhibit production of viable progeny.

Even in multicellular eukaryotes, such as humans, oxidative stress is a problem for cell survival. In this case, oxidative stress is a byproduct of oxidative cellular respiration occurring during metabolism in all cells. In humans, on average, about 50 DNA double-strand breaks occur per cell in each cell generation. Meiosis, which facilitates recombinational repair between non-sister chromosomes, can efficiently repair these prevalent damages in the DNA passed on to germ cells, and consequently prevent loss of fertility in humans. Thus with the theory that meiosis arose from prokaryotic sex, recombinational repair is the selective advantage of meiosis in both single celled eukaryotes and multicellular eukaryotes, such as humans.

An argument against this hypothesis is that adequate repair mechanisms including those involving recombination already exist in prokaryotes. Prokaryotes do have DNA repair mechanism enriched with recombinational repair, and the existence of prokaryotic life in severe environment indicates the extreme efficiency of this mechanism to help them survive many DNA damages related to the environment. This implies that an extra costly repair in the form of meiosis would be unnecessary. However, most of these mechanisms cannot be as accurate as meiosis and are possibly more mutagenic than the repair mechanism provided by meiosis. They primarily do not require a second homologous chromosome for the recombination that promotes a more extensive repair. Thus, despite the efficiency of recombinational repair involving sister chromatids, the repair still needs to be improved, and another type of repair is required. Moreover, due to the more extensive homologous recombinational repair in meiosis in comparison to the repair in mitosis, meiosis as a repair mechanism can accurately remove any damage that arises at any stage of the cell cycle more than mitotic repair mechanism can do and was, therefore, naturally selected. In contrast, the sister chromatid in mitotic recombination could have been exposed to similar amount of stress, and, thus, this type of recombination, instead of eliminating the damage, could actually spread the damage and decrease fitness.

=== Prophase I arrest ===
Female mammals and birds are born possessing all the oocytes needed for future ovulations, and these oocytes are arrested at the prophase I stage of meiosis. In humans, as an example, oocytes are formed between three and four months of gestation within the fetus and are therefore present at birth. During this prophase I arrested stage (dictyate), which may last for many years, four copies of the genome are present in the oocytes. The arrest of ooctyes at the four genome copy stage was proposed to provide the informational redundancy needed to repair damage in the DNA of the germline. The repair process used likely involves homologous recombinational repair. Prophase arrested oocytes have a high capability for efficient repair of DNA damages. The adaptive function of the DNA repair capability during meiosis appears to be a key quality control mechanism in the female germ line and a critical determinant of fertility.

=== Genetic diversity ===
Another hypothesis to explain the function of meiosis is that stress is a signal to the cell that the environment is becoming adverse. Under this new condition, it may be beneficial to produce progeny that differ from the parent in their genetic make up. Among these varied progeny, some may be more adapted to the changed condition than their parents. Meiosis generates genetic variation in the diploid cell, in part by the exchange of genetic information between the pairs of chromosomes after they align (recombination). Thus, on this view, an advantage of meiosis is that it facilitates the generation of genomic diversity among progeny, allowing adaptation to adverse changes in the environment.

However, in the presence of a fairly stable environment, individuals surviving to reproductive age have genomes that function well in their current environment. This raises the question of why such individuals should risk shuffling their genes with those of another individual, as occurs during meiotic recombination? Considerations such as this have led many investigators to question whether genetic diversity is a major adaptive advantage of sex.

== See also ==
- DNA repair
- Giardia
- Oxidative stress
- Asexual reproduction, ways to avoid the two-fold cost of sexual reproduction
  - Apomixis
  - Parthenogenesis
