= Germ cell nest =

The germ cell nest (germline cyst) forms in the ovaries, or testes during their development of gametes. The nest consists of multiple interconnected oogonia or spermatogonia formed by incomplete cytokinesis. The germ cells in both, are connected in the cysts by intercellular cytoplasmic bridges.

In the ovary the interconnected oogonia are surrounded by somatic cells called granulosa cells. Later on in development, the germ cell nests break down through invasion of granulosa cells. The result is individual oogonia surrounded by a single layer of granulosa cells.

== Formation in ovaries ==
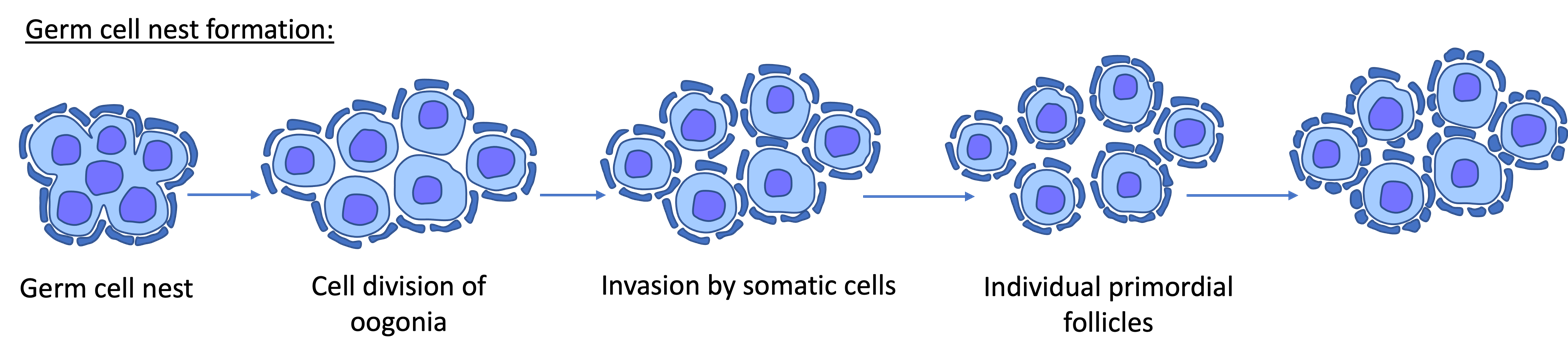
The formation of germ cell nest

Prior to meiosis primordial germ cells (PGCs) migrate to the gonads and mitotically divide along the genital ridge in clusters or nests of cells referred to as germline cysts or germ cell nests. The understanding of germ cell nest formation is limited. However, invertebrate models, especially drosophila have provided insight into the mechanisms surrounding formation. In females, it is suggested that cysts form from dividing progenitor cells. During this cyst formation, 4 rounds of division with incomplete cytokinesis occur resulting in cystocytes that are joined by intercellular bridges, also known as ring canals.

Rodent PGCs migrate to the gonads and mitotically divide at embryonic day (E) 10.5. It is at this stage they switch from complete to incomplete cytokinesis during the mitotic cycle from E10.5-E14.5. Germ cell nests emerge following consecutive divisions of progenitor cells resulting from cleavage furrows arresting and forming intercellular bridges. The intercellular bridges are crucial in maintaining effective communication. They ensure meiosis begins immediately after the mitotic cyst formation cycle is complete. In females, mitosis will end at E14.5 and meiosis will commence. However, It is possible that germ cells may travel to the gonads and cluster together forming nests after their arrival or form through cellular aggregation.

== Function ==
Most of our understanding of germ cell nests come from Drosophila (fruit flies). In the Drosophila model, germ cell nests arise from incomplete cell division (cytokinesis), forming bridges between the daughter cells called ring canals. In ovarian cysts, generally all but one cell differentiate into nurse cells and transport materials through these ring canals to accelerate the growth of the remaining cell, which becomes the oocyte (egg cell). In males, sperm cells almost all develop in these clusters of germ cells, and they are thought to benefit from the interconnection between them because the genetic materials are shared between them through the ring canals, which reduces the production of non-functional sperm and the selection for certain genotypes over others (meiotic drive). There is also a high level of synchronisation between the clustered germ cells in males. In females, germ cell nests enable large eggs to be produced through the support of differentiated cystocytes into nurse cells. Supporting the oocyte with nurse cells within the germ cell nest also means that the oocyte nucleus can stay inactive, which reduces its susceptibility to mutations and parasites (largely applies to insect models). However, there doesn’t seem to be much synchrony despite the presence of ring canals. Transport through ring canals is highly regulated and directional in the ovarian germ-line cysts.

Similar to the drosophila model, germ-line cysts in mammals such as mice and humans facilitate the transport of substances through the microtubules between nuclei within the syncytia. Organelles including the smooth ER, ribosomes, smooth vesicles, mitochondria and microtubules can be found within the ring canal in mouse, rabbit and human foetal ovaries. This allows organelles redistribution during oocyte differentiation, leading to about 20% of the foetal germ cells differentiating into primary oocytes with enriched cytoplasmic content. The germ cells that donate their cytoplasm undergo apoptosis. Besides this function, it has been proposed that germ-line cysts may also facilitate the onset of meiosis, facilitate organelle biogenesis through enriching mitochondria, inhibit mitosis to restrict the number of germ cells entering meiosis, and restrict the motility of germ cells.

== Breakdown ==
In the mouse, germ cell nest breakdown occurs just after birth, and in humans, this breakdown occurs during the second trimester of gestation. Germ cell nest breakdown involves the degeneration of many germ cell nuclei and the invasion of pre-granulosa cells into the nests. In the germ cell nest, one germ cell matures into an oocyte whereas others act as ‘nurse cells’, transferring their contents including cytoplasmic organelles like mitochondria into the predestined oocyte. These nurse cells subsequently undergo apoptosis.

Cytoplasmic bridges between the remaining nuclei are cleaved through protease action of the surrounding somatic cells. Once the granulosa cells have fully surrounded the remaining nuclei, a basement membrane is laid down and completely encompasses each newly formed primordial follicle. The reason for selective loss of germ cells during nest breakdown has been suggested to be due to genetic defects or failure of the germ cell to produce the necessary cytoplasmic organelles, therefore acting as a quality control mechanism.

== Formation in testes ==
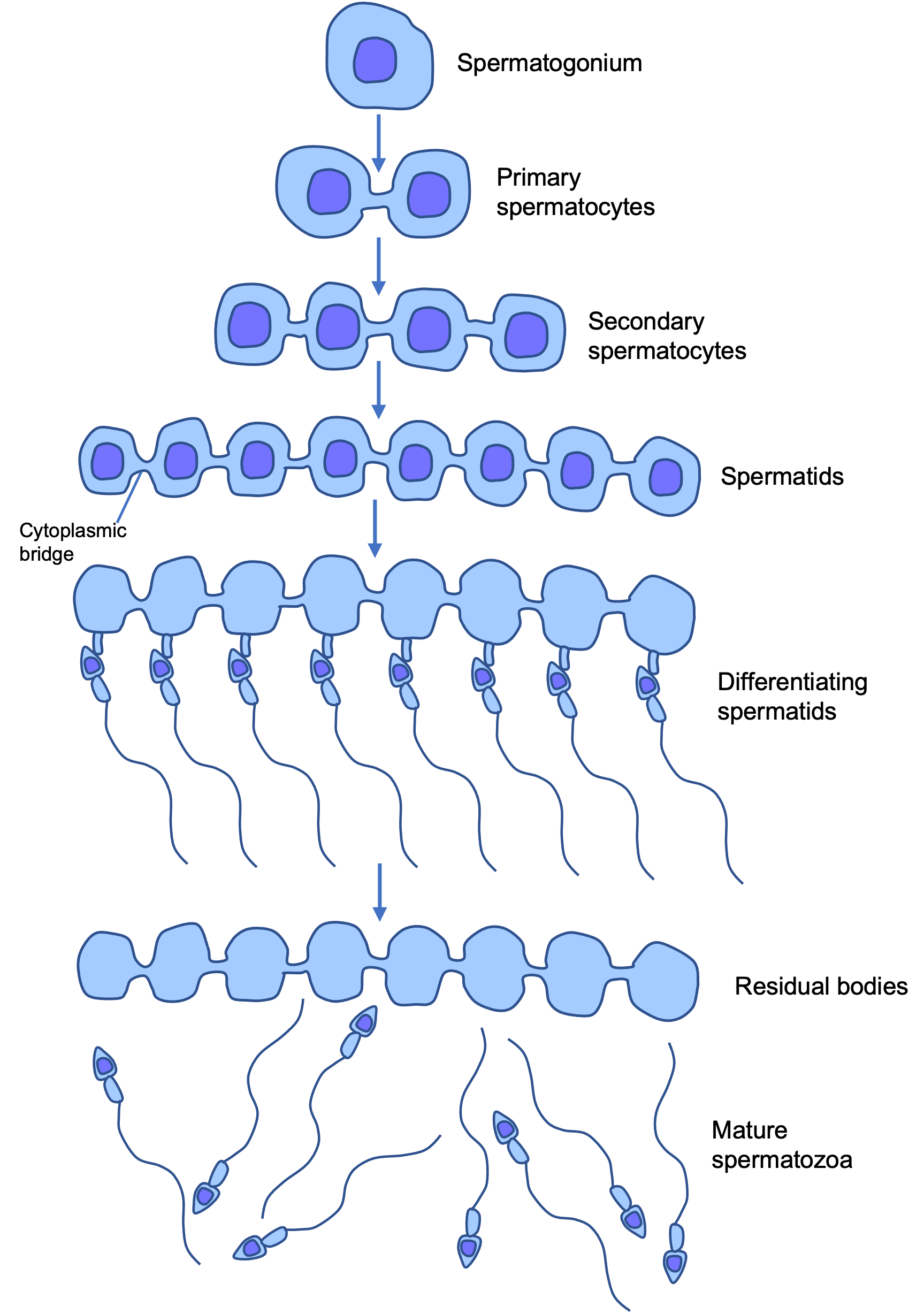
Image of spermatogenesis

In males, this process of spermatogenesis is slightly different to that of female oogenesis but does have a comparative germline cyst. Male germline stem cells divide asymmetrically to give one stem cell and a spermatogonia cell (unspecialised male germ cell) that undergoes mitotic proliferation to form primary spermatocytes (diploid - 46 chromosomes in the human). Each spermatocyte undergoes two rounds of meiosis to produce in the first round, two haploid secondary spermatocytes, and in the second round into four haploid (23 chromosomes in the human) spermatids. These spermatids then undergo differentiation into mature sperm.

In these developing male germ cells, they undergo incomplete cytokinesis during the mitosis and meiosis. Cytokinesis is normally when the cytoplasm of one parent cell divides to split into two daughter cells. Large clones of differentiating (specialising) daughter cells that have descended from one maturing spermatogonia (undifferentiated, immature male germ cell) remain connected by stable intracellular cytoplasmic bridges that interconnect the cells. This forms a syncytium – this is a mass of cytoplasm containing many nuclei enclosed within one plasma membrane. These persist until the end of sperm differentiation when individual sperm are released into the seminiferous tubule lumen. The seminiferous tubules are the functional unit of the testis, and contain germ cells at various stages of maturation, and many other constituents.

These intra-cellular bridges promote germ cell communication and sharing of cytoplasmic constituents, and allow for synchronisation of mitotic divisions and entry into meiosis. They are required for fertility in male insects and mammals. In mammals, germ cells form syncytia of hundreds of germ cells interconnected by intercellular bridges. As they share a common cytoplasm with their neighbours, cells can be supplied with all the products of a complete diploid genome. Developing sperm carrying a Y chromosome can be supplied with essential proteins encoded by genes on the X chromosome.
