= Cytoplasmic polyadenylation element =

RNA sequence

The cytoplasmic polyadenylation element (CPE) is a sequence element found in the 3' untranslated region of messenger RNA. While several sequence elements are known to regulate cytoplasmic polyadenylation, CPE is the best characterized. The most common CPE sequence is UUUUAU, though there are other variations. Binding of CPE binding protein (CPEB) to this region promotes the extension of the existing polyadenine tail and, in general, activation of the mRNA for protein translation. This elongation occurs after the mRNA has been exported from the nucleus to the cytoplasm. A longer poly(A) tail attracts more cytoplasmic polyadenine binding proteins (PABPs) which interact with several other cytoplasmic proteins that encourage the mRNA and the ribosome to associate. The lengthening of the poly(A) tail thus has a role in increasing translational efficiency of the mRNA. The polyadenine tails are extended from approximately 40 bases to 150 bases.

Cytoplasmic polyadenylation should be distinguished from nuclear polyadenylation; cytoplasmic polyadenylation occurs in the cytoplasm in specific mRNAs as opposed to occurring in the nucleus and affecting almost all eukaryotic mRNAs. Among other functions, a prominent role for the CPE has been identified in oogenesis, spermatogenesis, mitosis, and the growth of new synapses The role of the CPE was first characterized in Xenopus oocytes and embryos but recent research has identified roles for the CPE in somatic cells. Some proto-oncogene mRNAs have been shown to contain CPEs. One such gene is Myc. The level of production of the different CPEB proteins determines whether the expression of Myc leads to tumor formation. The tumor suppressor gene TP53 has also been shown to be regulated by a CPE. Cell lines that do not produce CPEB show lower levels of the protein p53 and become immortal instead of showing senescence.

The eCPE and the C-CPE are two other cytoplasmic polyadenylation elements that are found within embryos. The most common eCPE sequence is UUUUUUUUUUUU while the sequence of C-CPE is generally a very C rich region with the occasional U. All of these CPEs have in common that their effectiveness in promoting the extension of the poly(A) tail depends on their proximity to the poly(A) signal. Optimally, they should be within 25 nucleotides but can be as far as 100 nucleotides from the poly(A) signal. Alternately, CPEs can cause translation repression if two CPE sequences are located within 50 nucleotides of each other within the 3' UTR. The highest amounts of repression are seen when the two CPEs are 10 to 12 nucleotides apart. If the CPE has a nonconsensus sequence, a nearby Pumilio-binding element (PBE) is necessary for translational activation to result. If the CPE has a consensus sequence, the presence of the PBE can double the resulting translational activation. The CPE is not the only cis-acting element to regulate 3'UTR processing as alternative polyadenylation (APA) signals, microRNA target sites, and AU rich elements (ARE) also have roles in determining the length of the poly(A) tail.

== Research ==
Research into the CPE has focused on further elucidating its role in translational regulation and its role in development. Research on Aplysia neurons has shown that the CPE has a role in regulating memory formation. When long-term memories are being formed, CPEs found in neuronal actin mRNAs allow the up-regulation of this protein. Increased concentrations of actin allow new synapses to grow, allowing memory storage.

A study done on mRNA regulation during oogenesis in Drosophila has revealed that the CPE and CPE binding proteins help control the timing of protein production during development. Oocytes transcribe a large portion of their mRNA at one time and rely on other control mechanisms to determine the timing of protein production. The study showed that mRNAs that are a target of the CPEB WISP show significant polyA tail extension but not an increased number of mRNA transcripts.
