= Oocyte abnormalities =

Egg cell abnormalities

Oocytes are immature egg cells that develop to maturity within a follicle in the ovary. Oocyte abnormalities can occur due to several factors, including premature ovarian insufficiency (POI), other maturation abnormalities, maternal ageing, and mitochondrial abnormalities.

== Causes of oocyte abnormalities ==
Oocyte abnormalities can be caused by a variety of genetic factors affecting different stages in meiosis. Moreover, ageing is associated with oocyte abnormalities since higher maternal age is associated with oocytes with a reduced gene expression of spindle assembly checkpoints which are important in maintaining stability in the genome. A high maternal age is associated with increased chromosome segregation errors during meiosis as well, which leads to oocyte abnormalities.

Diet appears to also potentially have an effect on oocyte quality and a better diet seems to improve fertility in that aspect. Specifically, regular intake of oral antioxidants (mixture of vitamin C and E) was shown to reduce the negative effect of ageing on oocyte quantity and quality in female mice.

Chemotherapy also has an impact on the ovary and subsequently on the oocyte and granulosa cells.

=== Causes of premature ovarian insufficiency ===
Premature ovarian insufficiency (POI) is impairment of the ovaries and how they work before the age of 40 years. It can be caused by multiple factors, one being genetic. Genes and their influence determine the initial number of the primordial follicles, impact on the rate of follicular atresia, and are impactful on the age of menopause. With the advent of more sophisticated genetic screening technologies, 20 to 25% of cases of POI appear to be of genetic origin. There are cases where the origin of the condition cannot be defined or explained, and these are called idiopathic causes. Another cause could be autoimmunity, as more than 20% of women with POI have autoimmune diseases associated with the condition, such as Grave's or Hashimoto's. Infections, such as mumps, tuberculosis and malaria can also be causes of POI.

== Oocyte maturation abnormalities (OMAS) ==
Oocyte maturation abnormalities (OMAS) are repeatedly experienced in a small percentage of infertile women. These are problems with the maturation of oocytes; the step in oocyte development that occurs just before ovulation and successive fertilisation.

Oocytes must mature in order to reach reproductive potential. Until puberty, oocytes are kept in a dormant state in primordial follicles. At puberty the oocyte must exit its dormant stage and re-enter meiosis in order for ovulation to occur.

OMAS are usually diagnosed in women attempting in vitro fertilisation (IVF), and include premature ovarian insufficiency (POI), degenerated and dysmorphic oocytes, empty follicle syndrome (EFS), oocyte maturation arrest, and resistant ovary syndrome (ROS).

- Degenerated and dysmorphic oocytes are not uncommon in assisted reproduction. Degenerated oocytes are classified as damaged oocytes or oocytes without a zona pellucida. Dysmorphic oocytes are oocytes with abnormal physical characteristics, for example multiple nuclei.
- EFS is a condition occurring when no oocytes are produced from the mature follicle after ovulation is induced in cycles of in vitro fertilisation (IVF).
- Oocyte maturation arrest can be sub-classified into five different types of arrest, depending on the stage of maturation they are arrested at: germinal vesicle (GV) arrest, Meiosis I (MI) arrest, Meisos II (MII) arrest, GV and MI combined arrest, and mixed arrest.
- ROS is when the oocyte does not respond to normal hormone signals, and has increased levels of follicle stimulating hormone (FSH) and luteinising hormone (LH). Persevering immature oocytes are often observed in this condition.

== Ageing oocytes ==
Maternal age and its negative effects on oocytes plays a key role in the reduction of fertility in women over 25 years of age. Ageing predominantly affects oocytes during their arrest in the prophase of meiosis I – where genetic stability is often undermined.

The principal oocyte abnormality associated with increased maternal age is aneuploidy, in which chromosome segregation errors result in oocytes having the wrong number of chromosomes.

Causes for these errors are not fully understood however, some proposed mechanisms include:

- Oxidative stress, the impact of which is due to aging's connection with increased levels of reactive oxygen species (ROS). When left unchecked this can result in follicular atresia and reduction in both the number and quality of oocytes.
- Spindle assembly checkpoint malfunction causing gene imbalances that often result in the fertilised oocyte produced being incapable of developing further.
- Cohesion loss due to a decrease in REC8-cohesin complex, which would normally maintain the integrity of paired chromosomes (bivalents).
- DNA damage (especially involving radiation or chemotherapy) which results in oocyte elimination if picked up by the body.

== Mitochondria abnormalities ==
Normal function of mitochondria is to generate energy through oxidative phosphorylation. During oocyte maturation and fertilization mitochondria elongate, develop cristae and the matrix changes from a dense solution to a lighter matrix. Any abnormalities in this mitochondria development can lead to chromosomal segment disorders, oocyte maturation failures and arrested cell division.

After mitochondria has fully completed conformational changes, the mitochondria DNA copy number (mtDNA) increases rapidly to support the oocyte into the blastocyst stage. Therefore a higher mtDNA number is associated with better oocyte quality and potential of fertility. There are several factors that effect mitochondria quality. These are listed below:

=== Age ===
Mitochondria appear more swollen and present disrupted cristae with increased age. They have also been found to have lower mtDNA, increased reactive oxidative species and expression of Bax which upregulates apoptosis of follicles and early embryo arrest.

=== Obesity ===
Causes delayed maturation of oocytes whereby mitochondria display fewer and disarrayed cristae. The intracellular matrix has a lower electron density and increased swelling.

Both of these factors lead to an increased chance of miscarriage due to failure to implant into the uterine lining.

== Nondisjunction ==
Normally oocytes stay arrested at prophase of meiosis I. A surge in luteinising hormone triggers ovulation of the oocyte and triggers the resumption of meiosis. The germinal vesicle breaks down and spindles assemble as homologous chromosomes align the cell's equator for the first meiotic chromosome segregation. Here the oocyte splits where sister chromatids migrate to the same pole and the first polar body is formed. The oocyte now enters meiosis II and remains arrested in metaphase II until fertilization where sister chromatids will separate.

During this process at least one crossover per homologous pair is required for successful chromosome segregation. If this does not occur it can result in nondisjunction and aneuploidy. There are several factors that contribute towards failed crossovers including:

- Lack of cohesion along the chromosome arms means the chiasmata cannot be secured properly.
- Failed chiasmata maintenance. Crossovers that occur towards the end of the telomere can slide off the end of the homologous chromosomes leading to premature separation of the homologs causing defective chromosome configurations.
- Missegregation of sister chromatids during Metaphase II.
- Age dependent weakening of sister chromatid cohesion.
