= Primordial germ cell migration =

Process in developmental biology

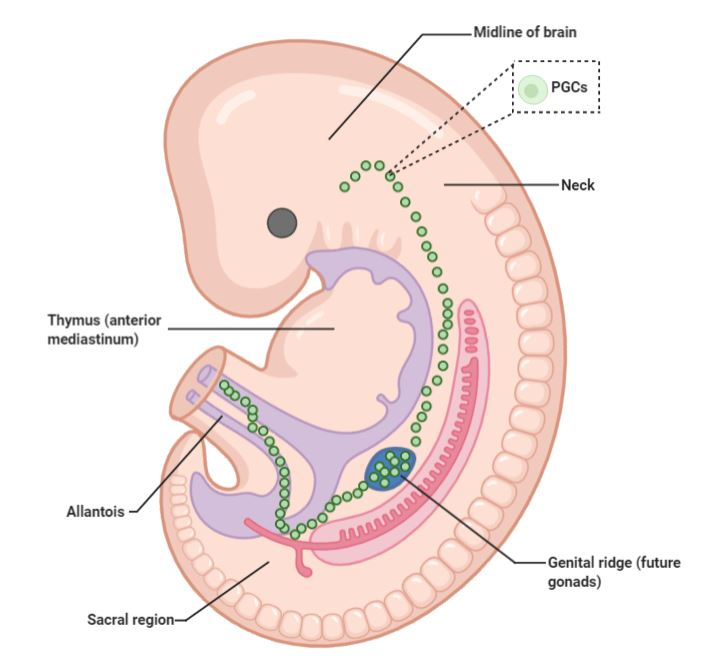
Primordial germ cell migration

Primordial germ cell migration is the process of distribution of primordial germ cells (PGCs) throughout the embryo during embryogenesis.

== Process ==
Primordial germ cells are among the first lineages that are established in development and they are the precursors for gametes. It is thought that the process of primordial germ cell migration itself has been conserved rather than the specific mechanisms within it, as chemoattraction and repulsion seem to have been borrowed from blood cells, neurones, and the mesoderm. For most organisms, PGC migration starts in the posterior (back end) of the embryo.

This process is in most cases distinct from PGC proliferation, with the exception of mammals in which both processes occur at the same time. In most mammals, specification occurs first, followed by migration, and then the proliferation process begins in the gonads. PGCs interact with a wide range of cell types as they move from the epiblast to the gonads. The PGCs move passively (without the need for energy) with underlying somatic cells, cross epithelial barriers, and respond to cues from their environment during active migration. An epithelium must be crossed in many species during germ cell migration, and changes in adhesion are observed in PGCs during their exit from the endoderm and during the initiation of active migration. Active migration takes place as PGCs move towards the developing somatic gonad. Effective migration requires cell elongation and polarity. Environmental guidance cues are required for the PGCs to initiate and sustain their mobility. Specific molecular pathways are activated to give PGCs motility.

=== Function ===
One of the functions of PGC migration is to allow them to reach the gonad, where they will go on to form sperm or oocytes. However, an additional function that this migration is thought to serve is as quality control for PGCs. Migration occurs early in gametogenesis, but PGCs could contain defects that could have a negative impact on later development - genetic mutations may be acquired because of proliferation in the blastocyst. This is done via a negative selection process – PGCs that are unable to complete migration are removed and those that are able to correctly respond to migration cues are preferred. PGCs that are able to migrate the fastest and reach the gonad are more likely to colonise it and give rise to future gametes. The PGCs that go off route or don't reach the gonad undergo programmed cell death (apoptosis). It is thought that every step after specification may function as a selective mechanism to ensure germ cells are of the highest quality. The selective mechanisms may also be important for removing PGCs with abnormal epigenetic marks and in doing so preserving the germline.

== In invertebrates ==
In Drosophila, the whole migration process has been estimated to take 10 hours. It begins with the formation of PGCs; from dividing nuclei becoming encircled by cell membranes, occurring at the posterior pole of the embryo. Division of the nuclei stops once they have a cell membrane. PGCs' transcription process is also thought to be actively subdued once formed.

In Drosophila, PGC migration begins with passive movement along the dorsal side of the embryo, during gastrulation. This is followed by more passive movement, due to the invagination of the posterior midgut primordium, which leads to the PGCs in the centre of the embryo, surrounded by epithelial cells that have been folded back on themselves. There is then a split into two groups, left and right respectively, as they actively migrate laterally across the epithelium to exit the gut, facilitated by fibroblast growth factor (FGF) signalling and a repulsion-based mechanism using enzymes encoded by the Wunen gene. This is followed by active movement dorsally along the basal side of the embryo. Through directional migration - which requires multiple genes to work, one being the Columbus (clb) gene, which codes for Drosophila HMG CoA reductase - the germ cells move towards the somatic gonadal precursor cells and associate with them. These two associated cell types then migrate together anteriorly, until they coalesce into the embryonic gonad at the future site of the mature gonad.

== In vertebrates ==
In vertebrate development, the location where primordial germ cells are specified and the subsequent migratory paths that they take differs among species.

=== Chicken ===
Chicken primordial germ cells are initially specified in the area pellucida (a one-cell thick layer of epiblast lying above the sub-germinal space). Following the formation of the primitive streak, the germ cells are carried to the germinal crescent region. Unlike most model organisms where germ cell migration is predominantly via the gut epithelium, chicken PGCs migrate through the embryonic vascular epithelium. Once they have exited the capillary vessels, the final stage of migration is along the dorsal mesentery to the developing gonad.

=== Mice ===
In mice, PGCs are specified in the proximal epiblast and subsequently migrate through the primitive streak towards the endoderm. The PGCs then embed themselves within the epithelium of the hind-gut and from there will migrate towards the mesoderm via the dorsal mesentery. There is then bilateral migration of the PGCs to the developing gonadal ridges which follows a pattern very similar to that found in Drosophila.

=== Zebrafish ===
Zebrafish PGCs are specified at four different locations within the early embryo via inheritance of germ plasm (a mixture of RNA and protein often associated with mitochondria). Germ cells from these four locations will then migrate dorsally after down-regulation of the rgs14a G-protein which regulates E-cadherin. Down-regulation will result in reduced cell-cell adhesion which allows the germ cells to separate and begin the migration process. Migration of the PGCs then continues towards the developing somites 1-3. This movement is coordinated by the expression of the chemo-attractant SDF1A (stromal derived factor 1a). The final migration towards the developing gonad occurs 13 hours-post-fertilisation after which point the germ cells coalesce with the somatic gonadal precursor cells. The entire process takes around 24 hours.

== Infidelity of PGCs ==
PGCs are described as the dedicated cells in early embryonic development, responsible for reaching the developing gonad. During their migration however, heterogeneity of cellular behaviour is observed due to change in cellular morphology from the time of specification to colonization. By the end of PGC migration, around 5% of migratory cells remain outside the gonad and later undergo apoptosis.

The apoptotic route during the migratory period is occurring via an intrinsic pathway; nonetheless, the elimination of PGCs can be unsuccessful and result in tumour formation known as teratomas, derivatives of the three germ layers. Mutations in Pten, CyclinD1, Dmrt1 and Dnd1 oncogenes in mice resulted in testicular teratomas, and variants are related with the same tumours in humans. Tumour formation (neoplasm) from foetal gonocytes suggests that they are incapable of maintaining proliferative arrest and resistance to further differentiation.

Even so, the origin of these teratomas could be distinct from the PGCs failing in migration. Extragonadal germ cell tumours (GCTs) evolve due to a lesion along the midline of the body, prior to the migratory PGCs movement through the hindgut and the medial mesentery to the gonads. Therefore, human GCTs originate from early embryo stem cells and the germ line, and unlike most tumours they seldom have somatic mutations, but instead are driven by unsuccessful control of their developmental potential, resulting in their reprogramming.
