= CPEB1 =

Protein-coding gene in humans

Identifiers
- Aliases: CPEB1, CEBP, CPE-BP1, CPEB, CPEB-1, hCPEB-1, h-CPEB, cytoplasmic polyadenylation element binding protein 1
- External IDs: OMIM: 607342; MGI: 108442; GeneCards: CPEB1
Available structures
PDB	Ortholog search: PDBe RCSB
PDB	List of PDB id codes 2M13, 2MKH, 2MKK, 2N1O

Gene location (Human)
Chr.	Chromosome 15 (human)
Band	15q25.2	Start	82,543,201 bp
Band	15q25.2	End	82,648,861 bp

Gene location (Mouse)
Chr.	Chromosome 7 (mouse)
Band	7|7 D3	Start	80,996,774 bp
Band	7|7 D3	End	81,105,213 bp
RNA expression pattern
Bgee	Human / Mouse (ortholog); Top expressed in: testicle; C1 segment; pituitary gland; anterior pituitary; Brodmann area 9; right testis; corpus callosum; superior frontal gyrus; left testis; substantia nigra / Top expressed in: primary oocyte; superior frontal gyrus; muscle of thigh; dentate gyrus of hippocampal formation granule cell; primary visual cortex; secondary oocyte; lumbar spinal ganglion; anterior horn of spinal cord; triceps brachii muscle; zygote; More reference expression data
BioGPS	n/a
Gene ontology
Molecular function	metal ion binding; mRNA 3'-UTR AU-rich region binding; translation factor activity, RNA binding; RNA binding; nucleic acid binding; ribosome binding; translation repressor activity, mRNA regulatory element binding; mRNA 3'-UTR binding; translation regulator activity; protein binding
Cellular component	synapse; cell projection; cell junction; neuron projection; messenger ribonucleoprotein complex; postsynaptic density; postsynaptic membrane; membrane; P-body; dendrite; plasma membrane; cytoplasm; nucleus; nucleoplasm; cytosol
Biological process	cellular response to insulin stimulus; regulation of translation; negative regulation of cytoplasmic translation; mRNA processing; cellular response to amino acid stimulus; cellular response to hypoxia; protein biosynthesis; positive regulation of mRNA polyadenylation
Sources:Amigo / QuickGO
Orthologs
Databases	NCBI: entry; OMA: entry
Species	Human	Mouse
Entrez	64506	12877
Ensembl	ENSG00000277445; ENSG00000214575	ENSMUSG00000025586
UniProt	Q9BZB8	P70166
RefSeq (mRNA)	NM_030594; NM_001079533; NM_001079534; NM_001079535; NM_001288819 NM_001288820	NM_001252525; NM_001252526; NM_007755; NM_001357107
RefSeq (protein)	NP_001073001; NP_001073002; NP_001073003; NP_001275748; NP_001275749 NP_085097; NP_001352169; NP_001352170; NP_001352171; NP_001352172; NP_001352173; NP_001352174; NP_001352175; NP_001352176; NP_001352177; NP_001352178; NP_001352179	NP_001239454; NP_001239455; NP_031781; NP_001344036
Location (UCSC)	Chr 15: 82.54 – 82.65 Mb	Chr 7: 81 – 81.11 Mb
PubMed search
- Wikidata
View/Edit Human	View/Edit Mouse

Cytoplasmic polyadenylation element-binding protein 1 is a protein that in humans is encoded by the CPEB1 gene.

This gene encodes a member of the cytoplasmic polyadenylation element (CPE) binding protein family. This highly conserved protein binds to a specific RNA sequence called the CPE found in the 3′ UTR of some mRNAs. Similar proteins in Xenopus and mouse function to induce cytoplasmic polyadenylation of dormant mRNAs with short polyA tails, resulting in their translation. Members of this protein family regulate translation of cyclin B1 during embryonic cell divisions. Multiple transcript variants encoding different isoforms have been found for this gene.
