= Dictyate =

Prolonged resting phase in oogenesis

The dictyate or dictyotene is a prolonged resting phase in oogenesis. It occurs in the stage of meiotic prophase I in ootidogenesis. It starts late in fetal life and is terminated shortly before ovulation by the LH surge. Thus, although the majority of oocytes are produced in female fetuses before birth, these pre-eggs remain arrested in the dictyate stage until puberty commences and the cells complete ootidogenesis.

In both mouse and human, oocyte DNA of older individuals has substantially more double-strand breaks than that of younger individuals.

The dictyate appears to be an adaptation for efficiently removing damages in germ line DNA by homologous recombinational repair. Prophase arrested oocytes have a high capability for efficient repair of DNA damages. DNA repair capability appears to be a key quality control mechanism in the female germ line and a critical determinant of fertility.

== Translation halt ==
There are a lot of mRNAs that have been transcribed but not translated during dictyate. Shortly before ovulation, the oocyte of interest activates these mRNA strains.

=== Biochemistry mechanism ===
Translation of mRNA in dictyate is partly explained by molecules binding to sites on the mRNA strain, which results in that initiation factors of translation can not bind to that site. Two such molecules, that impedes initiation factors, are CPEB and maskin, which bind to CPE (cytoplasmic polyadenylation element). When these two molecules remain together, then maskin binds the initiation factor eIF-4E, and thus eIF4E can no longer interact with the other initiation factors and no translation occurs. On the other hand, dissolution of the CPEB/maskin complex leads to eIF-4E binding to the initiation factor eIF-4G, and thus translation starts, which contributes to the end of dictyate and further maturation of the oocyte.

== See also ==
- Oogenesis
- Immature ovum
- Embryo
- Zygote
