= HMG-CoA reductase family =

Hydroxymethylglutaryl-coenzyme A reductase
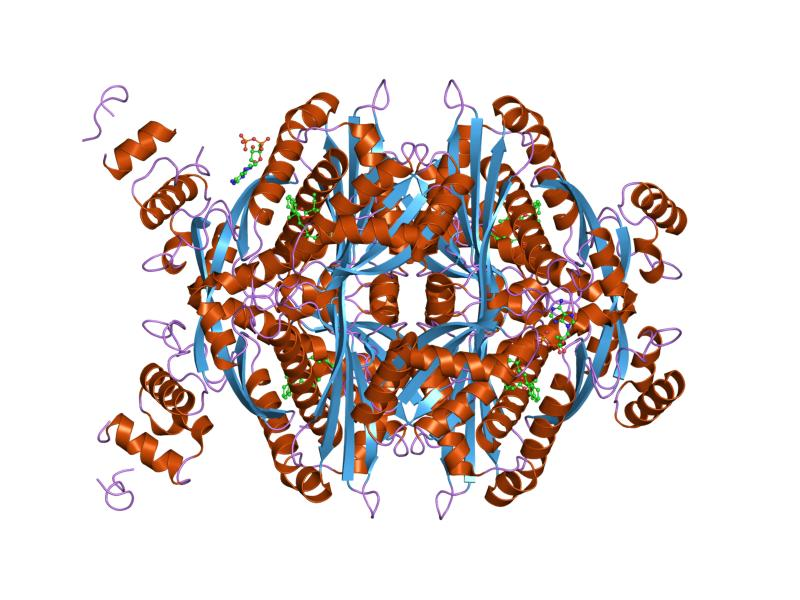
- complex of the catalytic portion of human hmg-coa reductase with compactin (also known as mevastatin)

Identifiers
- Symbol: HMG-CoA_red
- Pfam: PF00368
- InterPro: IPR002202
- PROSITE: PDOC00064
- SCOP2: 1qax / SCOPe / SUPFAM
Available protein structures:
- Pfam: structures / ECOD
- PDB: RCSB PDB; PDBe; PDBj
- PDBsum: structure summary

In molecular biology, the HMG-CoA reductase family is a family of enzymes which participate in the mevalonate pathway, the metabolic pathway that produces cholesterol and other isoprenoids.

There are two distinct classes of hydroxymethylglutaryl-coenzyme A (HMG-CoA) reductase enzymes: class I consists of eukaryotic and most archaeal enzymes EC 1.1.1.34, while class II consists of prokaryotic enzymes EC 1.1.1.88.

Class I HMG-CoA reductases catalyse the NADP-dependent synthesis of mevalonate from 3-hydroxy-3-methylglutaryl-CoA (HMG-CoA). In vertebrates, membrane-bound HMG-CoA reductase is the rate-limiting enzyme in the biosynthesis of cholesterol and other isoprenoids. In plants, mevalonate is the precursor of all isoprenoid compounds. The reduction of HMG-CoA to mevalonate is regulated by feedback inhibition by sterols and non-sterol metabolites derived from mevalonate, including cholesterol. In archaea, HMG-CoA reductase is a cytoplasmic enzyme involved in the biosynthesis of the isoprenoids side chains of lipids. Class I HMG-CoA reductases consist of an N-terminal membrane domain (lacking in archaeal enzymes), and a C-terminal catalytic region. The catalytic region can be subdivided into three domains: an N-domain (N-terminal), a large L-domain, and a small S-domain (inserted within the L-domain). The L-domain binds the substrate, while the S-domain binds NADP.

Class II HMG-CoA reductases catalyse the reverse reaction of class I enzymes, namely the NAD-dependent synthesis of HMG-CoA from mevalonate and CoA. Some bacteria, such as Pseudomonas mevalonii, can use mevalonate as the sole carbon source. Class II enzymes lack a membrane domain. Their catalytic region is structurally related to that of class I enzymes, but it consists of only two domains: a large L-domain and a small S-domain (inserted within the L-domain). As with class I enzymes, the L-domain binds substrate, but the S-domain binds NAD (instead of NADP in class I).
