= Mammalian CPEB3 ribozyme =

Ribozyme

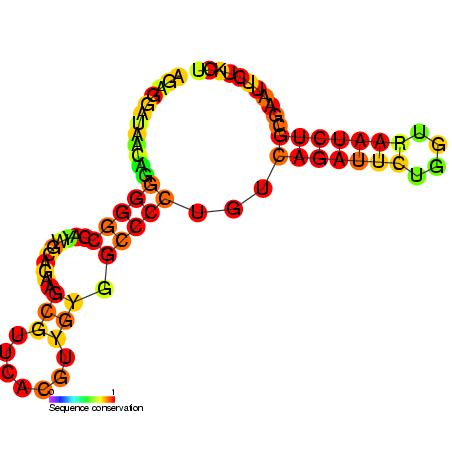
- Predicted secondary structure and sequence conservation of CPEB3_ribozyme

Identifiers
- Symbol: CPEB3_ribozyme
- Rfam: RF00622

Other data
- RNA type: Gene; ribozyme
- Domain: Eukaryota
- SO: SO:0000374
- PDB structures: PDBe

The mammalian CPEB3 ribozyme is a self cleaving non-coding RNA located in the second intron of the CPEB3 gene which belongs to a family of genes regulating messenger RNA polyadenylation. This ribozyme is highly conserved and found only in mammals. The CPEB3 ribozyme is structurally and biochemically related to the human hepatitis delta virus ribozyme. Other HDV-like ribozymes have been identified and confirmed to be active in vitro in a number of eukaryotes.
