= Translational regulation =

Translational regulation refers to the control of the levels of protein synthesized from its mRNA. This regulation is vastly important to the cellular response to stressors, growth cues, and differentiation. In comparison to transcriptional regulation, it results in much more immediate cellular adjustment through direct regulation of protein concentration. The corresponding mechanisms are primarily targeted on the control of ribosome recruitment on the initiation codon, but can also involve modulation of peptide elongation, termination of protein synthesis, or ribosome biogenesis. While these general concepts are widely conserved, some of the finer details in this sort of regulation have been proven to differ between prokaryotic and eukaryotic organisms.

== In prokaryotes ==
=== Initiation ===
Initiation of translation is regulated by the accessibility of ribosomes to the Shine-Dalgarno sequence. This stretch of four to nine purine residues are located upstream the initiation codon and hybridize to a pyrimidine-rich sequence near the 3' end of the 16S RNA within the 30S bacterial ribosomal subunit. Polymorphism in this particular sequence has both positive and negative effects on the efficiency of base-pairing and subsequent protein expression. Initiation is also regulated by proteins known as initiation factors which provide kinetic assistance to the binding between the initiation codon and tRNA^{fMet}, which supplies the 3'-UAC-5' anticodon. IF1 binds the 30S subunit first, instigating a conformational change that allows for the additional binding of IF2 and IF3. IF2 ensures that tRNA^{fMet} remains in the correct position while IF3 proofreads initiation codon base-pairing to prevent non-canonical initiation at codons such as AUU and AUC. Generally, these initiation factors are expressed in equal proportion to ribosomes, however experiments using cold-shock conditions have shown to create stoichiometric imbalances between these translational machinery. In this case, two to three fold changes in expression of initiation factors coincide with increased favorability towards translation of specific cold-shock mRNAs.

=== Elongation ===
Due to the fact that translation elongation is an irreversible process, there are few known mechanisms of its regulation. However, it has been shown that translational efficiency is reduced via diminished tRNA pools, which are required for the elongation of polypeptides. In fact, the richness of these tRNA pools are susceptible to change through cellular oxygen supply.

=== Termination ===
The termination of translation requires coordination between release factor proteins, the mRNA sequence, and ribosomes. Once a termination codon is read, release factors RF-1, RF-2, and RF-3 contribute to the hydrolysis of the growing polypeptide, which terminates the chain. Bases downstream the stop codon affect the activity of these release factors. In fact, some bases proximal to the stop codon suppress the efficiency of translation termination by reducing the enzymatic activity of the release factors. For instance, the termination efficiency of a UAAU stop codon is near 80% while the efficiency of UGAC as a termination signal is only 7%.

== In eukaryotes ==
=== Initiation ===
When comparing initiation in eukaryotes to prokaryotes, perhaps one of the first noticeable differences is the use of a larger 80S ribosome. Regulation of this process begins with the supply of methionine by a tRNA anticodon that basepairs AUG. This base pairing comes about by the scanning mechanism that ensues once the small 40S ribosomal subunit binds the 5' untranslated region (UTR) of mRNA. The usage of this scanning mechanism, in opposition to the Shine-Dalgarno sequence that was referenced in prokaryotes, is the ability to regulate translation through upstream RNA secondary structures. This inhibition of initiation through complex RNA structures may be circumvented in some cases by way of internal ribosomal entry sites (IRESs) that localize pre-initiation complexes (PIC) to the start site. In addition to this, the guidance of the PIC to the 5' UTR is coordinated by subunits of the PIC, known as eukaryotic initiation factors (eIFs). When some of these proteins are down-regulated through stresses, translation initiation is reduced by inhibiting cap dependent initiation, the activation of translation by binding eIF4E to the 5' 7-methylguanylate cap. eIF2 is responsible for coordinating the interaction between the Met-tRNA_{i}^{Met} and the P-site of the ribosome. Regulation by phosphorylation of eIF2 is largely associated with the termination of translation initiation. Serine kinases, GCN2, PERK, PKR, and HRI are examples of detection mechanisms for differing cellular stresses that respond by slowing translation through eIF2 phosphorylation.

=== Elongation ===
The hallmark difference of elongation in eukaryotes in comparison to prokaryotes is its separation from transcription. While prokaryotes are able to undergo both cellular processes simultaneously, the spatial separation that is provided by the nuclear membrane prevents this coupling in eukaryotes. Eukaryotic elongation factor 2 (eEF2) is a regulateable GTP-dependent translocase that moves nascent polypeptide chains from the A-site to the P-site in the ribosome. Phosphorylation of threonine 56 is inhibitory to the binding of eEF2 to the ribosome. Cellular stressors, such as anoxia have proven to induce translational inhibition through this biochemical interaction.

=== Termination ===
Mechanistically, eukaryotic translation termination matches its prokaryotic counterpart. In this case, termination of the polypeptide chain is achieved through the hydrolytic action of a heterodimer consisting of release factors, eRF1 and eRF3. Translation termination is said to be leaky in some cases as noncoding-tRNAs may compete with release factors to bind stop codons. This is possible due to the matching of 2 out 3 bases within the stop codon by tRNAs that may occasionally outcompete release factor base pairing. An example of regulation at the level of termination is functional translational readthrough of the lactate dehydrogenase gene LDHB. This readthrough provides a peroxisomal targeting signal that localizes the distinct LDHBx to the peroxisome.

== In plants ==
Translation in plants is tightly regulated as in animals, however, it is not as well understood as transcriptional regulation. There are several levels of regulation including translation initiation, mRNA turnover and ribosome loading. Recent studies have shown that translation is also under the control of the circadian clock. Like transcription, the translation state of numerous mRNAs changes over the diel cycle (day night period).
