= Oogenesis =

Egg cell production process

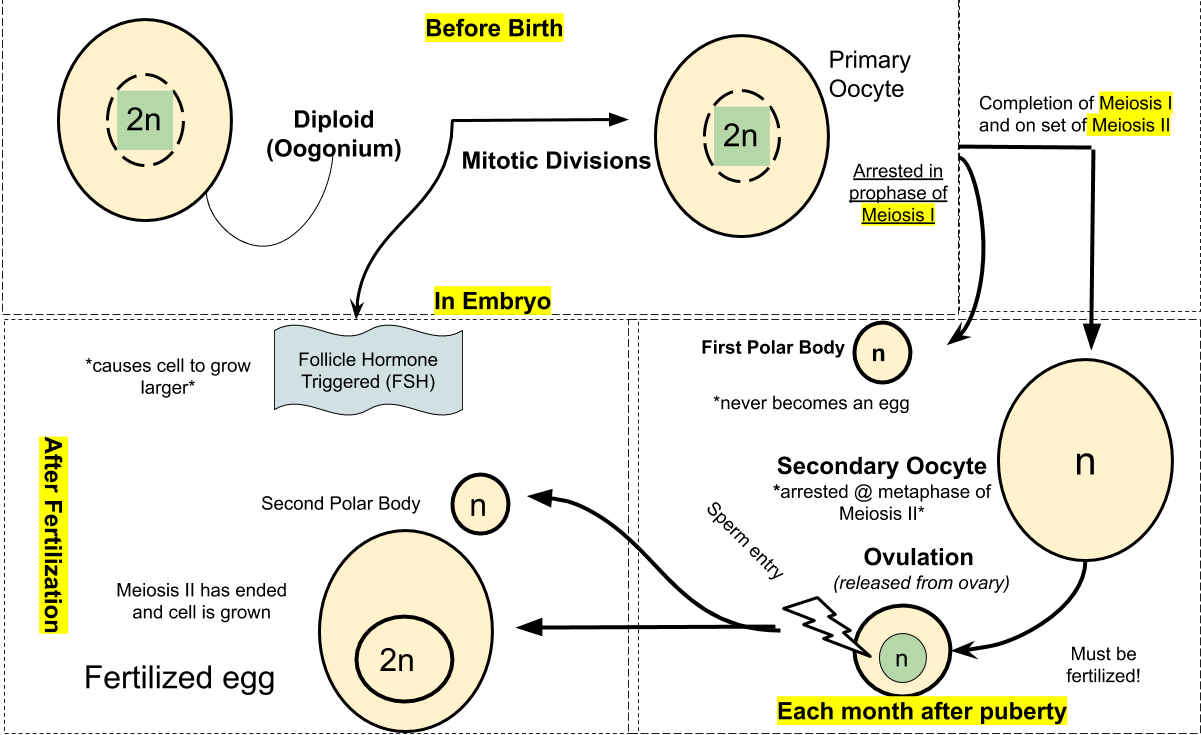
- Oogenesis is the process of the production of egg cells that takes places in the ovaries

Identifiers
- MeSH: D009866
- TE: E1.0.2.2.0.0.2

Oogenesis (/ˌoʊ.əˈdʒɛnɪsɪs/) or ovogenesis is female gametogenesis, the development of the egg cell (ovum) from the oogonium to a primary oocyte, and secondary oocyte. The egg cell is a cell that is competent to further develop when fertilized. Oogenesis is initiated during early embryonic development.

Oogonia originate from primordial germ cells (PGCs). The primordial germ cells arise from extraembryonic tissue, known as fetal membranes in humans and other mammals. Somatic cells arise from embryonic tissue. In the extraembryonic tissues the primordial germ cells avoid differentiation signals. PGCs migrate to the genital ridges, precursors to the gonads, ovaries in females, where they proliferate by mitosis to produce a large number of oogonia as primary oocytes.

== Stages ==
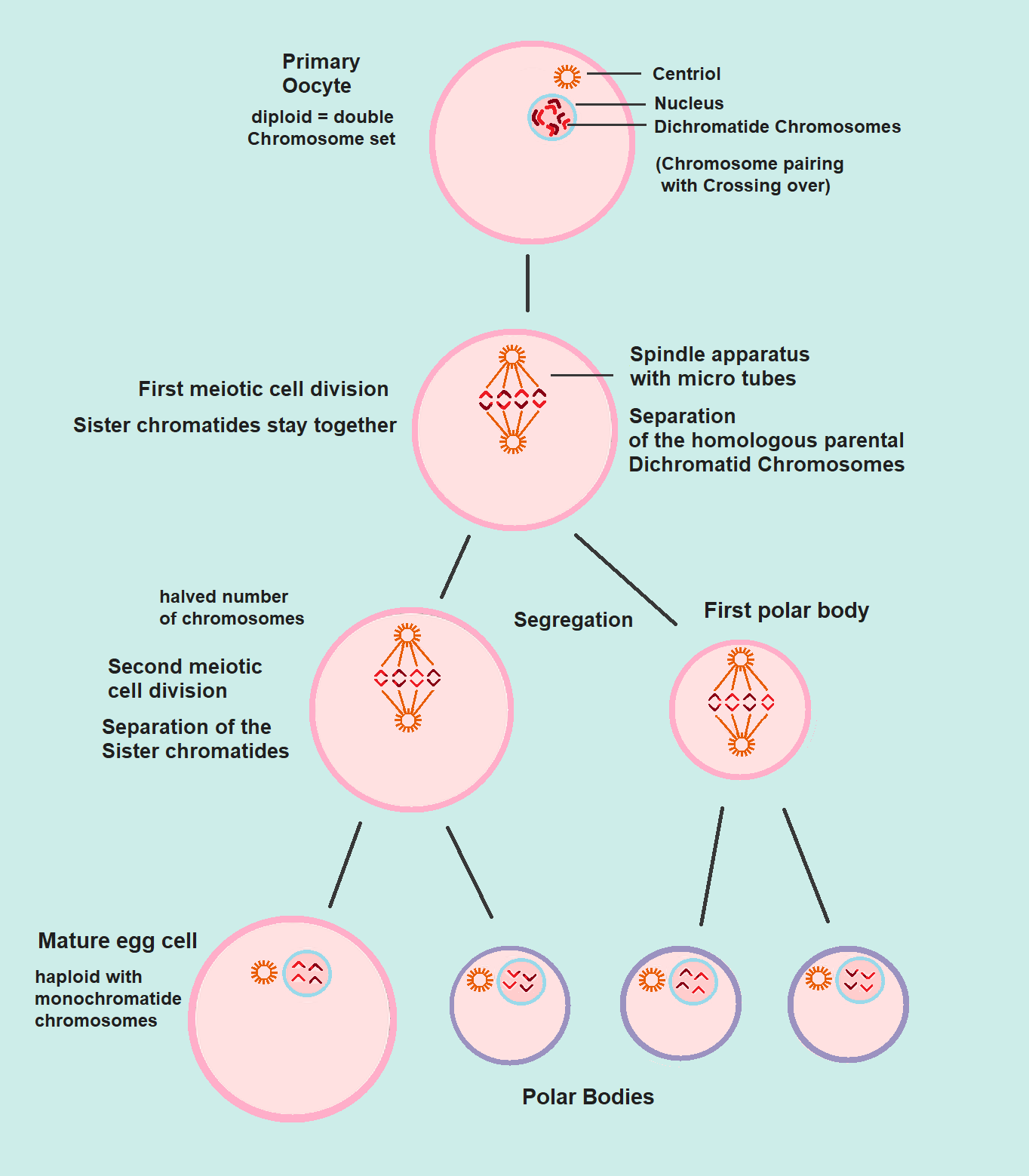
Diagram showing the reduction in number of the chromosomes in the process of maturation of the ovum. (In mammals, the first polar body normally disintegrates before dividing, so only two polar bodies are produced.)

Oogenesis progresses through oocytogenesis the formation of the primary oocyte, to the secondary oocyte and finally to ootidogenesis, the final maturation of the egg cell. Folliculogenesis is a separate parallel process that accompanies oocyte development.

Cell type	ploidy/chromosomes	chromatids	Process	Time of completion
Oogonium	diploid/46(2N)	2C	Oocytogenesis (mitosis)	Third trimester
primary oocyte	diploid/46(2N)	4C	Ootidogenesis (meiosis I) (Folliculogenesis)	Dictyate in prophase I for up to 50 years
secondary oocyte	haploid/23(1N)	2C	Ootidogenesis (meiosis II)	Halted in metaphase II until fertilization
Ootid	haploid/23(1N)	1C	Ootidogenesis (meiosis II)	Minutes after fertilization
Ovum	haploid/23(1N)	1C		

Oogonium —(Oocytogenesis)—> Primary Oocyte —(Meiosis I)—> First Polar body (Discarded afterward) + Secondary oocyte —(Meiosis II)—> Second Polar Body (Discarded afterward) + Ovum

Oocyte meiosis, important to all animal life cycles yet unlike all other instances of animal cell division, occurs completely without the aid of spindle-coordinating centrosomes.

=== Development ===
Oogonia originate from primordial germ cells (PGCs). The primordial germ cells arise from extraembryonic tissue, known as fetal membranes in humans and other mammals. Somatic cells arise from embryonic tissue. In the extraembryonic tissues the primordial germ cells avoid differentiation signals. PGCs migrate to the genital ridges, precursors to the gonads, ovaries in females, where they proliferate by mitosis to produce a large number of oogonia as primary oocytes.

=== Maintenance of meiotic arrest ===
Mammalian oocytes are maintained in meiotic prophase arrest for a very long time—months in mice, years in humans. Initially, the arrest is due to lack of sufficient cell cycle proteins to allow meiotic progression. However, as the oocyte grows, these proteins are synthesized, and meiotic arrest becomes dependent on cyclic AMP. The cyclic AMP is generated by the oocyte by adenylyl cyclase in the oocyte membrane. The adenylyl cyclase is kept active by a constitutively active G protein-coupled receptor known as GPR3 and a G protein, Gs, also present in the oocyte membrane.

Maintenance of meiotic arrest also depends on the presence of a multilayered complex of cells, known as a follicle, that surrounds the oocyte. Removal of the oocyte from the follicle causes meiosis to progress in the oocyte. The cells that comprise the follicle, known as granulosa cells, are connected to each other by proteins known as gap junctions, that allow small molecules to pass between the cells. The granulosa cells produce a small molecule, cyclic GMP, that diffuses into the oocyte through the gap junctions. In the oocyte, cyclic GMP prevents the breakdown of cyclic AMP by the phosphodiesterase PDE3, and thus maintains meiotic arrest. The cyclic GMP is produced by the guanylyl cyclase NPR2.

=== Reinitiation of meiosis ===
As follicles grow, they acquire receptors for luteinizing hormone, a pituitary hormone that reinitiates meiosis in the oocyte and causes ovulation of a fertilizable egg. Luteinizing hormone acts on receptors in the outer layers of granulosa cells of the follicle, causing a decrease in cyclic GMP in the granulosa cells. Because the granulosa cells and oocyte are connected by gap junctions, cyclic GMP also decreases in the oocyte, causing meiosis to resume. Meiosis then proceeds to second metaphase, where it pauses again until fertilization. Luteinizing hormone also stimulates gene expression leading to ovulation.

Oogenesis in eukaryotic cells. (A) oogonium where the mitotic division occurs (B) differentiation and meiosis I begins (C) primary oocyte (D) meiosis I is completed and meiosis II begins (E) secondary oocyte (F) first polar body (G) ovulation must occur and the presence of the sperm penetration (fertilization) induces meiosis II to completion (H) ovum (I) second polar body

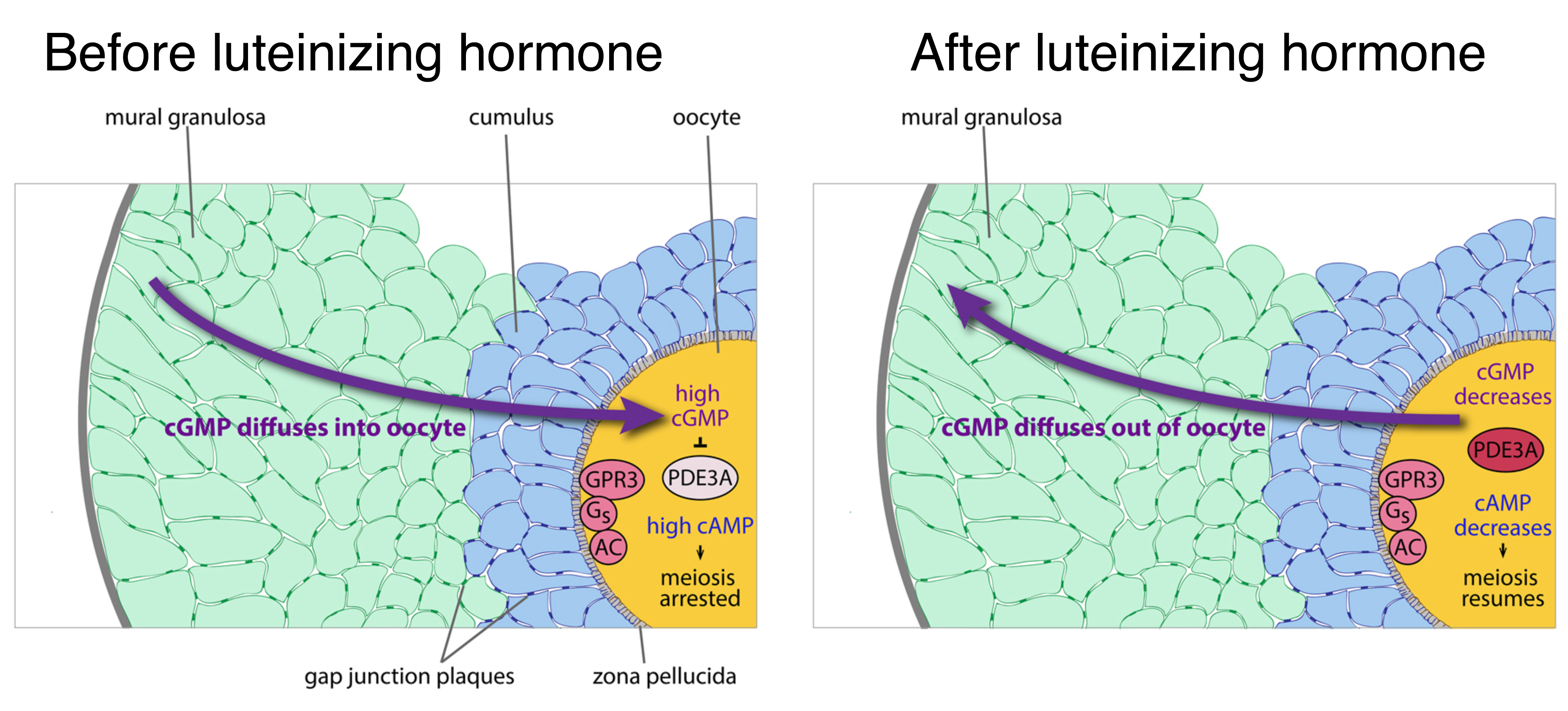

== In humans ==
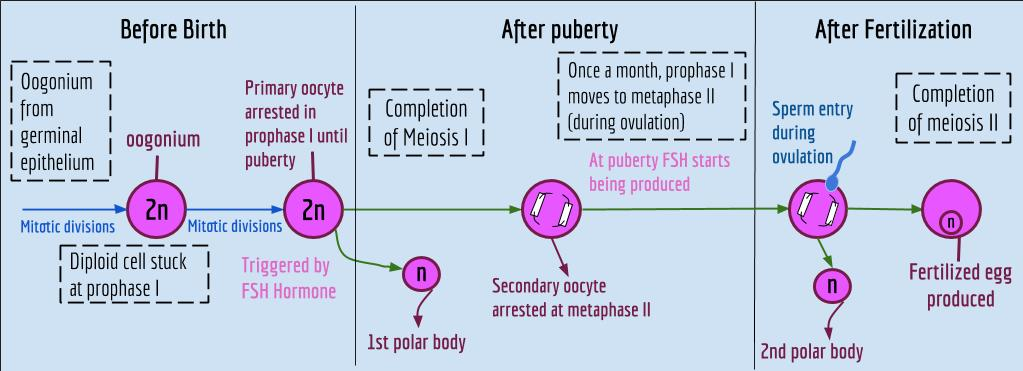
Oogenesis throughout a woman's life

In humans, oogenesis begins in embryonic development with the transformation of oogonia into primary oocytes, a process called oocytogenesis. From one single oogonium, only one mature oocyte will rise, with three other cells called polar bodies. Oocytogenesis is complete either before or shortly after birth.

=== Number of primary oocytes ===
Primary oocytes reach their maximum development at ~20 weeks of gestational age, when approximately seven million primary oocytes have been created. At birth, this number has already been reduced to approximately 1-2 million. At puberty, the number of oocytes decreases even more to reach about 300,000, and only about 400–500 mature oocytes will be produced during a woman's life, the others will undergo atresia (degeneration).

=== Ootidogenesis ===
The succeeding phase of ootidogenesis occurs when the primary oocyte undergoes meiosis to develop into an ootid stage of an immature ovum. Although this process begins at prenatal age, it stops at prophase I. In late fetal life, all oocytes, still primary oocytes, have halted at this stage of development, called the dictyate. After menarche, these cells then continue to develop, although only a few do so every menstrual cycle.

==== Meiosis I ====
Meiosis I of ootidogenesis begins during embryonic development, but halts in the diplotene stage of prophase I until puberty. The mouse oocyte in the dictyate (prolonged diplotene) stage actively repairs DNA damage, whereas DNA repair is not detectable in the pre-dictyate (leptotene, zygotene and pachytene) stages of meiosis. For those primary oocytes that continue to develop in each menstrual cycle, however, synapsis occurs and tetrads form, enabling chromosomal crossover to occur. As a result of meiosis I, the primary oocyte has now developed into the secondary oocyte.

==== Meiosis II ====
Immediately after meiosis I, the haploid secondary oocyte initiates meiosis II. However, this process is also halted at the metaphase II stage until fertilization, if such should ever occur. If the egg is not fertilized, it is disintegrated and released (menstruation) and the secondary oocyte does not complete meiosis II (and does not become an ovum). When meiosis II has completed, an ootid and another polar body have now been created. The polar body is small in size.

=== Ovarian cycle ===
The ovarian cycle is divided into several phases:

- Follicologenesis: Synchronously with ootidogenesis, the ovarian follicle surrounding the ootid has developed from a primordial follicle to a preovulatory one. The primary follicle takes four months to become a preantral, two months to become antral, and then passes to a mature Graafian follicle. The primary follicle has oocyte-lining cells that go from floor to cubic and begin to proliferate, increasing the metabolic activity of the oocyte and follicular cells, which release glycoproteins and proteoglycans acids that will form the zona pellucida, which accompany the installation. In the preantral secondary follicle, internal and external theca cells begin to form. Aromatase, produced by follicular cells, transforms androgens produced by the inner theca into estrogens under the stimulation of FSH. LH stimulates theca cells to produce androgens. In the antral follicle, there is an antrum containing a follicle liquor, which contains estrogen, to allow the passage from the antral follicle to the Graafian follicle. The follicular antrum moves the oocyte and becomes eccentric; the oocyte is always surrounded by the zona pellucida and by granulosa cells that form the cumulus oophorus. The innermost cells are called the corona radiata. At this stage, the oocyte produces cortical granules containing acid glycoproteins.
- Dominant follicle selection: The follicle with more FSH receptors will be more favored, simultaneously inducing the death of the other follicles (3-10 antral follicles that enter this phase each month). Low concentration estrogen will inhibit further production of FSH by the pituitary gland with negative feedback, so the follicles left behind will accumulate in the follicular antrum instead of androgens.
- Graafian follicle: Estrogen at other concentrations induces LH release, with the peak of LH called LH surge, which induces stages that will lead to follicle burst. LH receptors also appear on follicular cells, which stimulate the oocyte to become a secondary oocyte, blocked in metaphase, waiting for fertilization. LH also stimulates oophore cumulus cells to release progesterone.
- Ovulation: bursting of the follicle, oocyte leakage with zona pellucida, and radiated corona cells. The lining membrane is thinned on the ovary where the follicle bursts and the cells attached to it emerge from the stigma. The ovum is collected by the fimbriae into the fallopian tube (oviduct), where fertilization can take place in the ampulla, the widest part of the oviduct where fertilization typically occurs.
- Formation of the corpus luteum: From the remaining structures of the follicle, the corpus luteum is formed. At first, there is a clot, which is then replaced by loose connective tissue; the cells that form solid cords are follicular cells and cells of the [outer theca (Tecali lutein cells) and internal (granulosa cells). The luteal body increases the concentration of progesterone, which LH constantly stimulates. If the egg is not fertilized, the corpus luteum degenerates (corpus albicans); if it is implantated, it remains until three months of pregnancy, where its function is replaced by the placenta (production of progesterone and estrogen). The level of LH (necessary to keep the corpus luteum alive) is replaced by human chorionic gonadotropin.

=== Uterine cycle ===
The uterine cycle occurs parallel to the ovarian cycle and is induced by estrogen and progesterone. The endometrium, formed by a monostratified cylindrical epithelium, with uterine glands (simple tubular), connective with a functional superficial layer (divided into a spongy layer, a compact layer, and a deeper basal layer, which is always maintained, presents four phases:

- Proliferative phase: From the 5th to the 14th day of the ovarian cycle, it is conditioned by estrogens. The functional layer of the uterus is restored, with mitotic division of the basal layer.
- Secretive phase: from the 14th to the 27th day of the ovarian cycle, influenced by the progesterone produced by the corpus luteum. Cells become hypertrophic, and tubular glands begin to produce glycogen
- Ischemic phase: beginning of the menstrual phase from 27 to 28 days
- Regressive or desquamative phase from 1 to 5 days, the spiral-shaped arteries undergo ischemia, and the functional layer detaches

If, instead, there is fertilization, the uterine mucosa is modified to accommodate the fertilized egg, and the secretive phase is maintained.

=== Maturation into ovum ===
Both polar bodies disintegrate at the end of meiosis II, leaving only the ootid, which then eventually undergoes maturation into a mature ovum.

The function of forming polar bodies is to discard the extra haploid sets of chromosomes that have resulted as a consequence of meiosis.

=== In vitro maturation ===
In vitro maturation (IVM) is the technique of letting ovarian follicles mature in vitro. It can potentially be performed before an IVF. In such cases, ovarian hyperstimulation is not essential. Rather, oocytes can mature outside the body prior to IVF. Hence, no (or at least a lower dose of) gonadotropins have to be injected in the body. Immature eggs have been grown until maturation in vitro at a 10% survival rate, but the technique is not yet clinically available. With this technique, cryopreserved ovarian tissue could possibly be used to make oocytes that can directly undergo in vitro fertilization.

=== In vitro oogenesis ===
By definition, it means to recapitulate mammalian oogenesis and produce fertilizable oocytes in vitro. It is a complex process involving several different cell types, precise follicular cell-oocyte reciprocal interactions, a variety of nutrients and combinations of cytokines, and precise growth factors and hormones depending on the developmental stage. In 2016, two papers published by Morohaku et al. and Hikabe et al. reported in vitro procedures that appear to reproduce efficiently these conditions allowing for the production, completely in a dish, of a relatively large number of oocytes that are fertilizable and capable of giving rise to viable offspring in the mouse. This technique can be mainly benefited in cancer patients where in today's condition their ovarian tissue is cryopreserved for preservation of fertility. Alternatively to the autologous transplantation, the development of culture systems that support oocyte development from the primordial follicle stage represent a valid strategy to restore fertility. Over time, many studies have been conducted with the aim to optimize the characteristics of ovarian tissue culture systems and to better support the three main phases: 1) activation of primordial follicles; 2) isolation and culture of growing preantral follicles; 3) removal from the follicle environment and maturation of oocyte cumulus complexes. While complete oocyte in vitro development has been achieved in mouse, with the production of live offspring, the goal of obtaining oocytes of sufficient quality to support embryo development has not been completely reached into higher mammals despite decades of effort.

== Ovarian aging ==
BRCA1 and ATM proteins are employed in repair of DNA double-strand break during meiosis. These proteins appear to have a critical role in resisting ovarian aging. However, homologous recombinational repair of DNA double-strand breaks mediated by BRCA1 and ATM weakens with age in oocytes of humans and other species. Women with BRCA1 mutations have lower ovarian reserves and experience earlier menopause than women without these mutations. Even in woman without specific BRCA1 mutations, ovarian aging is associated with depletion of ovarian reserves leading to menopause, but at a slower rate than in those with such mutations. Since older premenopausal women ordinarily have normal progeny, their capability for meiotic recombinational repair appears to be sufficient to prevent deterioration of their germline despite the reduction in ovarian reserve. DNA damages may arise in the germline during the decades long period in humans between early oocytogenesis and the stage of meiosis in which homologous chromosomes are effectively paired (dictyate stage). It has been suggested that such DNA damages may be removed, in large part, by mechanisms dependent on chromosome pairing, such as homologous recombination.

== Other animals and plants ==
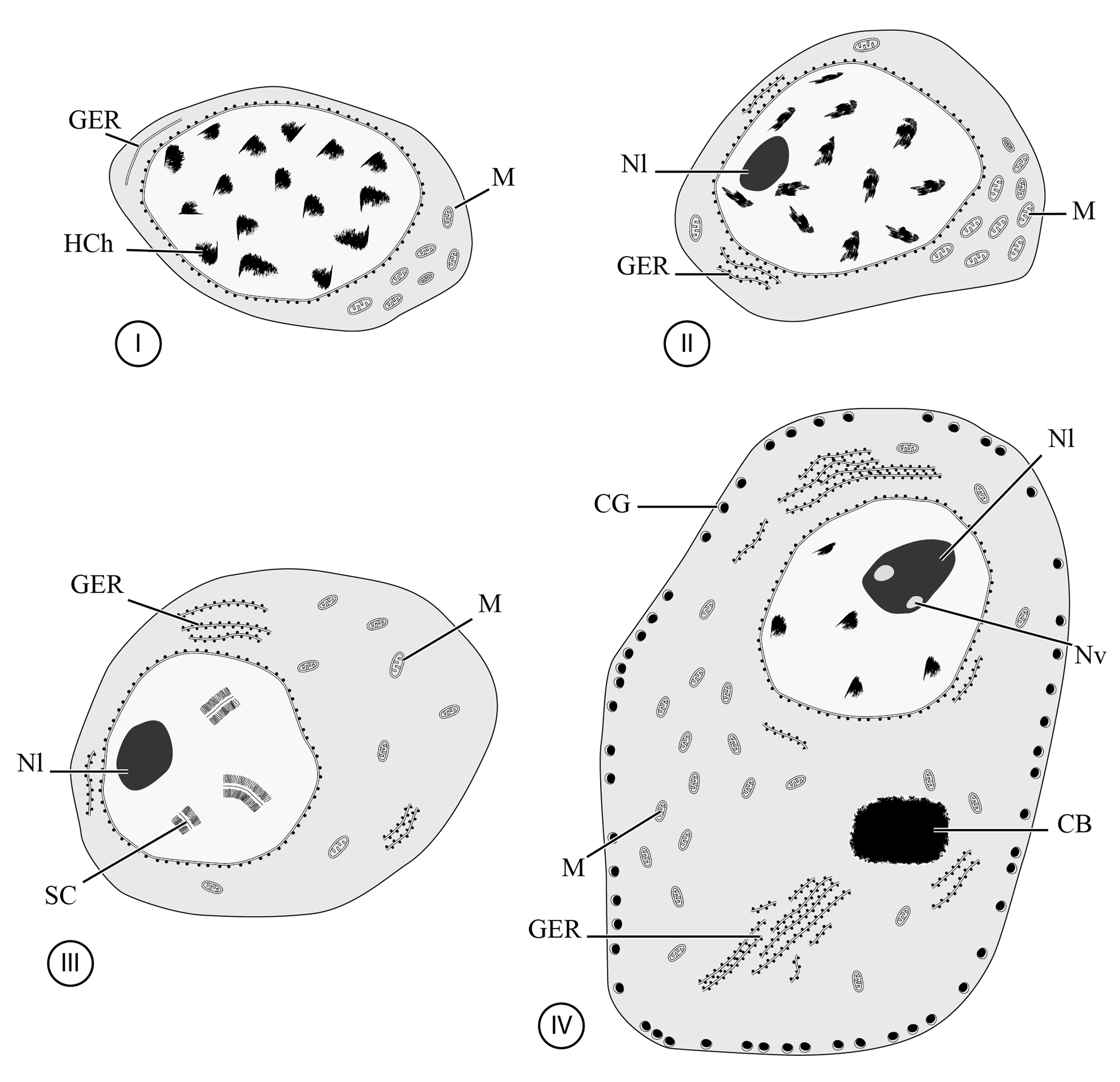
Diagram of oogenesis in a digenean (Platyhelminthes)

Some algae and the oomycetes produce eggs in oogonia. In the brown alga Fucus, all four egg cells survive oogenesis, which is an exception to the rule that generally only one product of female meiosis survives to maturity.

In plants, oogenesis occurs inside the female gametophyte via mitosis. In many plants such as bryophytes, ferns, and gymnosperms, egg cells are formed in archegonia. In flowering plants, the female gametophyte has been reduced to an eight-celled embryo sac within the ovule inside the ovary of the flower. Oogenesis occurs within the embryo sac and leads to the formation of a single egg cell per ovule.

In ascaris, the oocyte does not even begin meiosis until the sperm touches it, in contrast to mammals, where meiosis is completed in the estrus cycle.

In female Drosophila flies, genetic recombination occurs during meiosis. This recombination is associated with formation of DNA double-strand breaks and the repair of these breaks. The repair process leads to crossover recombinants as well as at least three times as many noncrossover recombinants (e.g. arising by gene conversion without crossover).

== See also ==
- Anisogamy
- Archegonium
- Evolution of sexual reproduction
- Female infertility
- Female reproductive system
- Oncofertility
- Origin and function of meiosis
- Sexual reproduction
- Spermatogenesis
