= Polar body =

Byproduct of oogenesis

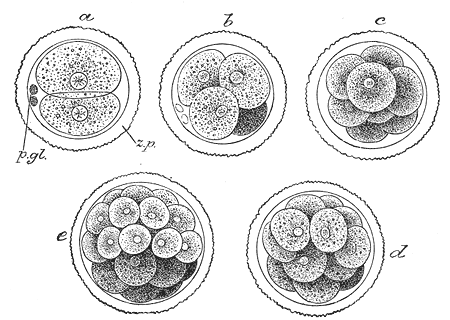
First stages of segmentation of a mammalian embryo. Semidiagrammatic. z.p. Zona pellucida. p.gl. Polar bodies. a. Two-cell stage. b. Four-cell stage. c. Eight-cell stage. d, e. Morula stage.

A polar body is a small haploid cell that is formed at the same time as an egg cell during oogenesis, but generally does not have the ability to be fertilized. It is named from its polar position in the egg.

When certain diploid cells in animals undergo cytokinesis after meiosis to produce egg cells, they sometimes divide unevenly. Most of the cytoplasm is segregated into one daughter cell, which becomes the egg or ovum, while the smaller polar bodies only get a small amount of cytoplasm. They frequently die and disintegrate by apoptosis, but in some cases remain and can be important in the life cycle of the organism.

== Twinning ==
Polar body twinning is a form of twinning in meiosis, where one or more polar bodies do not disintegrate and are fertilized by sperm.

Twinning would occur, in principle, if the egg cell and a polar body were both fertilized by separate sperms. However, even if fertilization occurred, further development would usually not occur because the zygote formed by the fusion of the sperm and polar body would not have enough cytoplasm or stored nutrients to feed the developing embryo.

Polar bodies were first reported in 1824 by Carus in gastropods, but their role was not clarified until the work of Butschli in 1875, Giard in 1876, and finally Hertwig in 1877. These structures were often confused with egg fragments or expelled yolk masses, but were eventually referred to as directional bodies (or Richtungskörper), a term implying the place where the maturation divisions start. The common names "polocytes" and "polar bodies" derive from their polar position in the eggs. Polar bodies were characterized in the early 20th century, by O. Hertwig, T. Boveri, and E.L. Mark, as non-functioning egg cells which disintegrated because the spermatozoon, with rare exceptions, could not fertilize them and instead chemically triggered their dissolution.

Polar bodies serve to eliminate one half of the diploid chromosome set produced by meiotic division in the egg, leaving behind a haploid cell. To produce the polar bodies, the cell must divide asymmetrically, which is fueled by furrowing (formation of a trench) near a particular point on the cell membrane. The presence of chromosomes induces the formation of an actomyosin cortical cap, a myosin II ring structure and a set of spindle fibers, the rotation of which promotes invagination at the edge of the cell membrane and splits the polar body away from the oocyte.

Meiotic errors can lead to aneuploidy in the polar bodies, which, in the majority of cases, produces an aneuploid zygote. Errors can occur during either of the two meiotic divisions that produce each polar body, but are more pronounced if they occur during the formation of the first polar body, because the formation of the first polar body influences the chromosomal makeup of the second. For example, predivision (the separation of chromatids before anaphase) in the first polar body can induce the formation of an aneuploid polar body. Therefore, the formation of the first polar body is an especially important factor in forming a healthy zygote.

However, chromosomally abnormal polar bodies are not guaranteed to induce the development of an abnormal zygote. A euploid zygote can be produced if the aneuploidy is reciprocal: one polar body has an extra chromosome and the other lacks the same chromosome (see also uniparental disomy). If the extra chromosome is absorbed into a polar body rather than being passed into the oocyte, trisomy can be averted. Whether this is a chance event or is some way influenced by the microenvironment is unclear. In at least one case, this euploid zygote has been traced through development to birth as a healthy child with a normal chromosome count.

== Medical applications ==
A polar body biopsy is the sampling of a polar body of an oocyte. After sampling of a polar body, subsequent analysis can be used to predict viability and pregnancy chance of the oocyte, as well as the future health of a person resulting from such a pregnancy. The latter use makes it a form of preimplantation genetic screening (PGS). Compared to a blastocyst biopsy, a polar body biopsy can potentially be of lower costs, less harmful side-effects, and more sensitive in detecting abnormalities. The main advantage of the use of polar bodies in PGD is that they are not necessary for successful fertilisation or normal embryonic development, thus ensuring no deleterious effect for the embryo.

One of the disadvantages of PB biopsy is that it only provides information about the maternal contribution to the embryo, which is why cases of autosomal dominant and X-linked disorders that are maternally transmitted can be diagnosed, and autosomal recessive disorders can only partially be diagnosed. Another drawback is the increased risk of diagnostic error, for instance due to the degradation of the genetic material or events of recombination that lead to heterozygous first polar bodies.

== Parthenogenesis ==
In some species, the polar body may re-merge with the egg cell. This can result in a viable embryo that has only one parent, a process called parthenogenesis.

== Additional images ==
Diagram showing the reduction in number of the chromosomes in the process of maturation of the ovum.

Scheme showing analogies in the process of maturation of the ovum and the development of the spermatids.

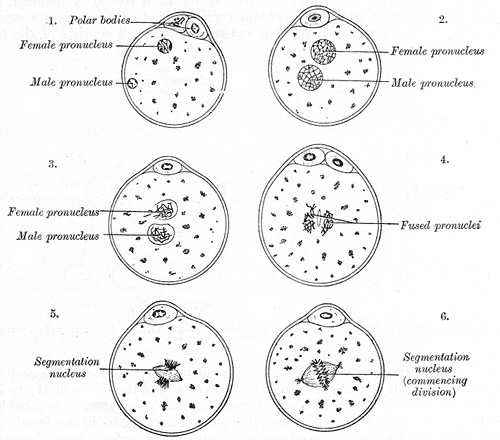
The process of fertilization in the ovum of a mouse.

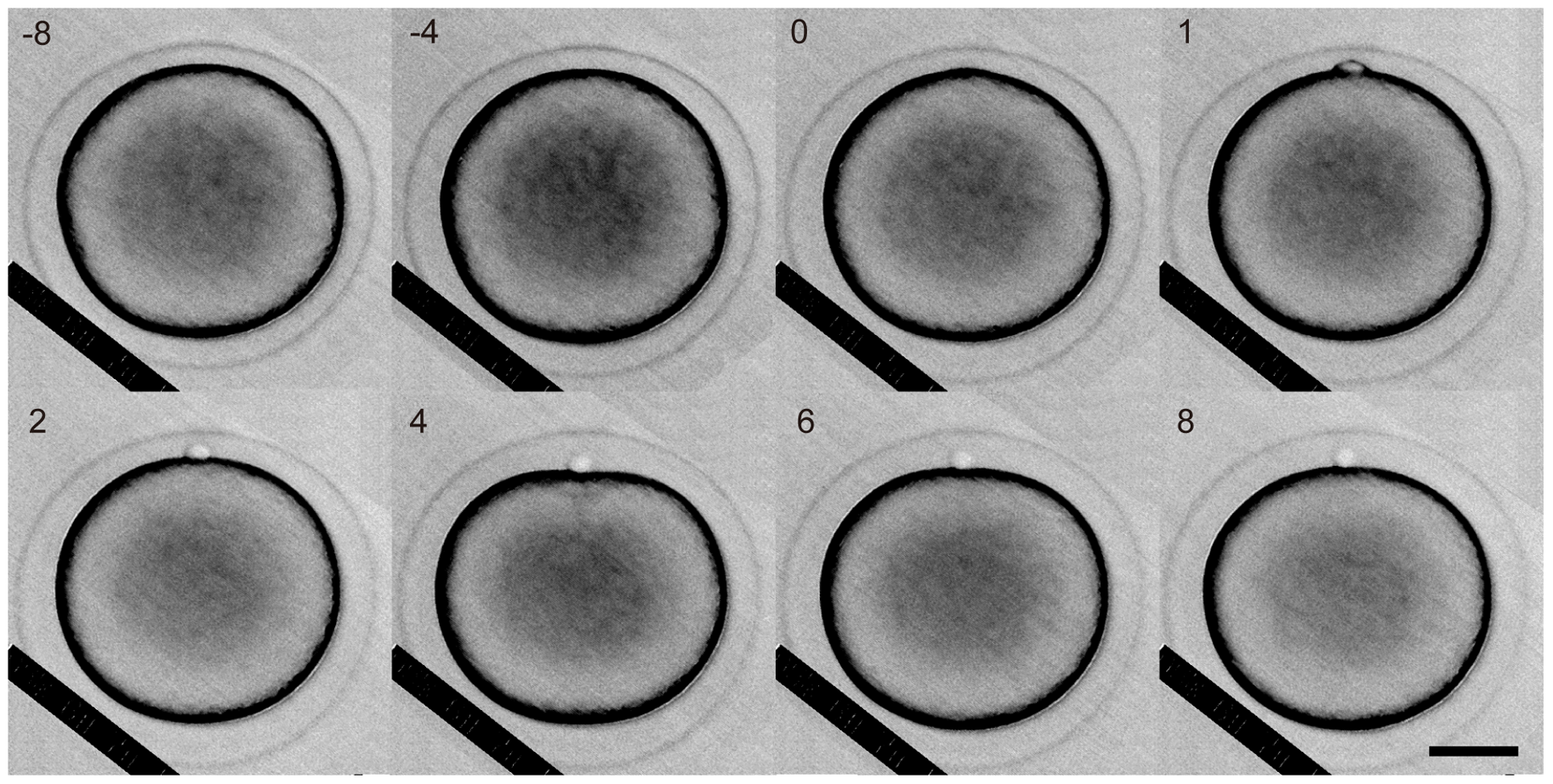
Polar body bulging from an animal pole of a starfish oocyte
