= Oocyte =

Immature ovum or egg cell

- Through the processes of oogenesis and folliculogenesis, an immature oocyte develops and becomes a mature egg cell.

Identifiers
- MeSH: D009865
- FMA: 18644

An oocyte (/ˈoʊəsaɪt/, oöcyte, or ovocyte) is an immature egg cell (or ovum) in the female reproductive system, produced prenatally in the ovary during the process of gametogenesis.

Primordial germ cells migrate to the embryonic gonad. After sexual differentiation they proliferate by mitosis to produce a very large number of oogonia. The oogonia clump together in germ cell nests where they associate with somatic cells resulting in the formation of ovarian follicles. A follicle consists of an oogonium now known as a primary oocyte surrounded by a layer of supportive follicular cells. The first follicles are known as primordial follicles.

Two processes of oogenesis, and folliculogenesis are interdependent in the development of the egg cell. The primary oocytes remain as primary oocytes until the primordial follicles progress through primary to secondary follicle and the primary oocyte becomes a secondary oocyte.

An oocyte is a form of genetic material that can be collected for oocyte cryopreservation used in assisted reproduction.

== Formation ==
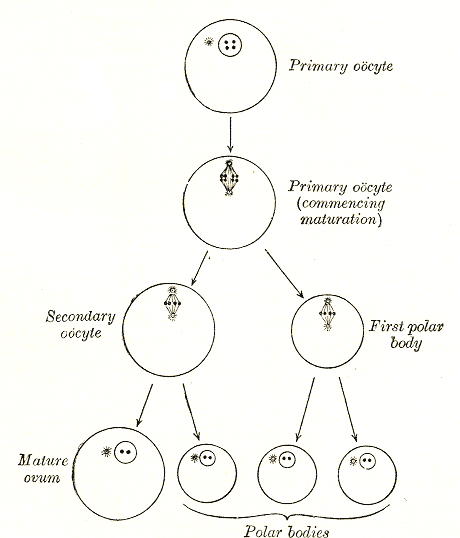
Diagram showing the reduction in number of the chromosomes in the process of maturation of the ovum; the process is known as meiosis.

The formation of an oocyte is called oocytogenesis, which is the initial stage in the process of oogenesis. The primordial germ cells arrive at the genital ridge, and after sexual determination of the ovary, they proliferate mitotically to produce millions of oogonia. The oogonia clump together in germ cell nests where they associate with somatic cells in the ovary. This results in the formation of the ovarian follicles, consisting of a single oogonium now known as an oocyte, surrounded by a single layer of pre-granulosa cells known as follicular cells. The oocyte in the follicle is known as a primary oocyte. In humans the process of oogenesis results in the development of primary oocytes during the fetal period, to secondary oocytes at puberty, as part of ovulation. Oogenesis and folliculogenesis are interdependent processes in the development of the mature egg cell.

== Structure ==
The oolemma is the plasma membrane of an oocyte that surrounds the oocyte cytoplasm. The oolemma, is surrounded by a glycoprotein coat known as the zona pellucida in mammals, and as the vitelline membrane in non-mammals.

=== Cytoplasm ===
Oocytes are rich in cytoplasm, also known as ooplasm which contains yolk granules to nourish the cell early in development. In mammals oocytes are the largest cells in the body and have a huge cytoplasmic volume. These cells in large animals, including humans have a diameter of 120 μm-130 μm (micrometres); a typical somatic cell has a diameter of 10 μm-20 μm.

Cortical granules are membrane-bound organelles in the cytoplasm that function as secretory vesicles. They range from 0.2 μm to 0.6 μm in diameter and are produced and located in the cortex of the later stage oocyte. During fertilization cortical granule exocytosis is part of oocyte activation triggered by the entry of sperm. Cortical granules empty their contents into the extracellular matrix where they take part in preventing polyspermy by modifying the zona pellucida.

=== Nucleus ===
In the primary oocyte stage, the nucleus is called a germinal vesicle. In most animals the centrally placed nucleus moves to the edge or cortex of the oocyte as it develops. This positioning generally defines the oocyte's animal pole but this is not determined in humans.

The only normal human type of secondary oocyte has the 23rd (sex) chromosome as 23,X (female-determining), whereas sperm can have 23,X (female-determining) or 23,Y (male-determining).

=== Balbiani body ===
Balbiani bodies form near to the primary oocyte nucleus. A Balbiani body is a membraneless compartment consisting of organelles including endoplasmic reticulum, Golgi bodies and mitochondria, and a molecular condensate including proteins. The constituents and their roles vary across animal species. The Balbiani body is thought to protect mRNAs from being degraded or from prematurely being expressed. The contents are released into the oocyte cytoplasm in later stages of development.

=== Cumulus-oocyte complex ===
The cumulus-oocyte complex contains layers of tightly packed cumulus cells surrounding and in contact with the oocyte in the Graafian follicle. The oocyte is arrested in Meiosis II at the stage of metaphase II at the diplotene stage and is considered a secondary oocyte. Before ovulation, the cumulus complex goes through a structural change known as cumulus expansion. The granulosa cells transform from tightly compacted to an expanded mucoid matrix. Many studies show that cumulus expansion is critical for the maturation of the oocyte because the cumulus complex is the oocyte's direct communication with the developing follicle environment. It also plays a significant role in fertilization, though the mechanisms are not entirely known and are species specific.

== Maternal contributions ==
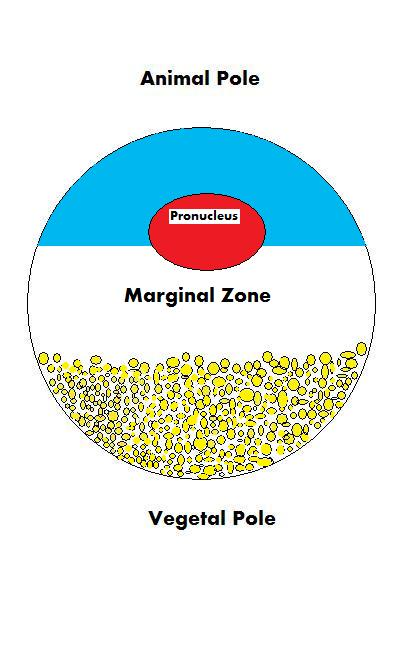
Oocyte poles

In order for an oocyte to become fertilized and ultimately grow into a fully functioning organism, it must be able to regulate multiple cellular and developmental processes. The oocyte, a large and complex cell, must be able to direct the growth of the embryo and control cellular activities. As the oocyte is a product of female gametogenesis, the maternal contribution to the oocyte and consequently the newly fertilized egg, is enormous. There are many types of molecules that are maternally supplied to the oocyte, which will direct various activities within the growing zygote.

=== Avoidance of damage to germ-line DNA ===
The DNA of a cell is vulnerable to the damaging effect of oxidative free radicals produced as byproducts of cellular metabolism. DNA damage occurring in oocytes, if not repaired, can be lethal and result in reduced fecundity and loss of potential progeny. Oocytes are substantially larger than the average somatic cell, and thus considerable metabolic activity is necessary for their provisioning. If this metabolic activity were carried out by the oocyte's metabolic machinery, the oocyte genome would be exposed to the reactive oxidative by-products generated. Thus it appears that a process evolved to avoid this vulnerability of germline DNA. It was proposed that, in order to avoid damage to the DNA genome of the oocytes, the metabolism contributing to the synthesis of much of the oocyte's constituents was shifted to other maternal cells that then transferred these constituents to oocytes. Thus, oocytes of many organisms are protected from oxidative DNA damage while storing up a large mass of substances to nurture the zygote in its initial embryonic growth.

=== mRNAs and proteins ===
During the growth of the oocyte, a variety of maternally transcribed messenger RNAs, or mRNAs, are supplied by maternal cells. These mRNAs can be stored in mRNP (message ribonucleoprotein) complexes and be translated at specific time points, they can be localized within a specific region of the cytoplasm, or they can be homogeneously dispersed within the cytoplasm of the entire oocyte. Maternally loaded proteins can also be localized or ubiquitous throughout the cytoplasm. The translated products of the mRNAs and the loaded proteins have multiple functions; from regulation of cellular "house-keeping" such as cell cycle progression and cellular metabolism, to regulation of developmental processes such as fertilization, activation of zygotic transcription, and formation of body axes. Below are some examples of maternally inherited mRNAs and proteins found in the oocytes of the African clawed frog.

Name	Type of maternal molecule	Localization	Function
VegT	mRNA	Vegetal hemisphere	Transcription factor
Vg1	mRNA	Vegetal hemisphere	Transcription factor
XXBP-1	mRNA	Not known	Transcription factor
CREB	Protein	Ubiquitous	Transcription factor
FoxH1	mRNA	Ubiquitous	Transcription factor
p53	Protein	Ubiquitous	Transcription Factor
Lef/Tcf	mRNA	Ubiquitous	Transcription factor
FGF2	Protein	Nucleus	Not known
FGF2, 4, 9 FGFR1	mRNA	Not known	FGF signaling
Ectodermin	Protein	Animal hemisphere	Ubiquitin ligase
PACE4	mRNA	Vegetal hemisphere	Proprotein convertase
Coco	Protein	Not known	BMP inhibitor
Twisted gastrulation	Protein	Not known	BMP/Chordin binding protein
fatvg	mRNA	Vegetal hemisphere	Germ cell formation and cortical rotation

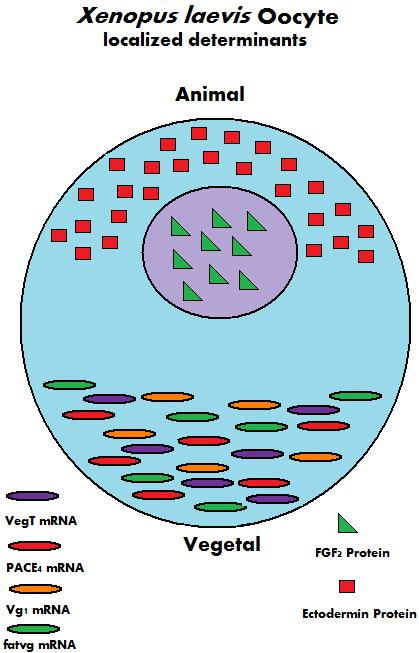
Maternal determinants in Xenopus laevis oocyte

=== Mitochondria ===
The oocyte receives mitochondria from maternal cells, which will go on to control embryonic metabolism and apoptotic events. The partitioning of mitochondria is carried out by a system of microtubules that will localize mitochondria throughout the oocyte. In certain organisms, such as mammals, paternal mitochondria brought to the oocyte by the spermatozoon are degraded through the attachment of ubiquitinated proteins. The destruction of paternal mitochondria ensures the strictly maternal inheritance of mitochondria and mitochondrial DNA (mtDNA).

=== Nucleolus ===
In mammals, the nucleolus of the oocyte is derived solely from maternal cells. The nucleolus, a structure found within the nucleus, is the location where rRNA is transcribed and assembled into ribosomes. While the nucleolus is dense and inactive in a mature oocyte, it is required for proper development of the embryo.

=== Ribosomes ===
Maternal cells also synthesize and contribute a store of ribosomes that are required for the translation of proteins before the zygotic genome is activated. In mammalian oocytes, maternally derived ribosomes and some mRNAs are stored in a structure called cytoplasmic lattices. These cytoplasmic lattices, a network of fibrils, protein, and RNAs, have been observed to increase in density as the number of ribosomes decrease within a growing oocyte and mutation in them have been linked to infertility.

== Prophase I arrest ==
Female mammals and birds are born possessing all the oocytes needed for future ovulations, and these oocytes are arrested at the prophase I stage of meiosis. In humans, as an example, oocytes are formed between three and four months of gestation within the fetus and are therefore present at birth. During this prophase I arrested stage (dictyate), which may last for many years, four copies of the genome are present in the oocytes. The arrest of ooctyes at the four-genome copy stage appears to provide the informational redundancy needed to repair damage in the DNA of the germline. The repair process used likely involves homologous recombinational repair. Prophase arrested oocytes have a high capability for efficient repair of DNA damages. In particular, DNA double-strand breaks can be repaired during the period of prophase arrest by homologous recombinational repair and by non-homologous end joining. DNA repair capability appears to be a key quality control mechanism in the female germ line and a critical determinant of fertility.

== Paternal contributions ==
The spermatozoon that fertilizes an oocyte will contribute its pronucleus, the other half of the zygotic genome. In some species, the spermatozoon will also contribute a centriole, which will help make up the zygotic centrosome required for the first division. However, in some species, such as in the mouse, the entire centrosome is acquired maternally. Currently under investigation is the possibility of other cytoplasmic contributions made to the embryo by the spermatozoon.

During fertilization, the sperm provides three essential parts to the oocyte: (1) a signalling or activating factor, which causes the metabolically dormant oocyte to activate; (2) the haploid paternal genome; (3) the centrosome, which is responsible for maintaining the microtubule system. See anatomy of sperm

== Abnormalities ==
- Nondisjunction—a failure of proper homolog separation in meiosis I, or sister chromatid separation in meiosis II can lead to aneuploidy, in which the oocyte has the wrong number of chromosomes. This is the cause of conditions in humans such as Down syndrome (trisomy 21) and Edwards syndrome (trisomy 18). It is more likely with advanced maternal age.
- Some oocytes are multinucleate having multiple nuclei, although it is thought they never mature.

== See also ==
- Cryoconservation of animal genetic resources
- Folliculogenesis
- Oocyte maturation inhibitor
- Polar body
- Symmetry breaking and cortical rotation
- Oocyte abnormalities
- List of distinct cell types in the adult human body

== Sources ==
- Purves WK, Orians GH, Sadava D, Heller HC (2004). Life: The Science of Biology (7th ed.). Freeman, W. H. & Company. pp. 823–824. ISBN 978-0-7167-9856-9.

Preceded by None	Stages of human development Sperm + Oocyte	Succeeded by Zygote
