= Cancer in adolescents and young adults =

- Specialty: Oncology

Cancer in adolescents and young adults is cancer which occurs in those between the ages of 15 and 39. This occurs in about 70,000 people a year in the United States—accounting for about 5 percent of cancers. This is about six times the number of cancers diagnosed in children ages 0–14. Globally, more than 1.3 million young adults between the ages of 15 and 39 were diagnosed with cancer in 2022, and nearly 378,000 people in this age range died from cancer.

Young adults are more likely than either younger children or older adults to be diagnosed with certain cancers, such as Hodgkin lymphoma, testicular cancer, and some types of sarcomas. In adolescents and young adults 15 to 24 years old, lymphoma, testicular cancer, and thyroid cancer are the most common types, while among 25- to 39-year-olds, breast cancer and melanoma are more common.

== Definition ==
People who are diagnosed with cancer between the ages of 15 and 39 fit the definition of "adolescent and young adults" according to the Report of the Adolescent and Young Adult Oncology Progress Review Group. While this age range is commonly used in the United States, age ranges used to characterize adolescent and young adult populations in terms of cancer care and research may vary by country, region, or study. For example, throughout much of Europe and in Australia, adolescence and young adulthood in terms of cancer is defined as ages 15 through 24, while the age range accepted by the Canadian Cancer Society is 15 through 29.

== Types ==
The most common cancers among 15- to 39-year-olds worldwide in 2018, determined by estimated age-standardized incidence rates, were:

- Breast cancer
- Cervical cancer
- Thyroid cancer
- Testicular cancer
- Ovarian cancer
- Leukemia
- Non-Hodgkin Lymphoma
- Colorectal cancer
- Brain and other CNS tumors
- Liver cancer
- Oral cancer
- Hodgkin lymphoma
- Uterine cancer
- Melanoma
- Stomach cancer

== Treatment ==
For some types of cancer, young adults may have better outcomes if treated with pediatric, rather than adult, treatment regimens. Young adults who have a cancer that typically occurs in children and adolescents, such as brain tumors, leukemia, osteosarcoma, and Ewing sarcoma, may fare better if treated by a pediatric oncologist. For example, adolescents and young adults with acute lymphoblastic leukemia (ALL) may have better outcomes if they are treated with pediatric treatment protocols rather than adult treatment protocols. The 5-year survival rates for 15- to 19-year-olds with ALL has risen to 74% as of 2007–2013, from survival rates of around 50% in the early 1990s. This may be due to greater use of treatment protocols for children.

Young adults who have cancers that are more common in adults, such as breast cancer and melanoma, may be better treated by a medical oncologist.

=== Fertility ===
Cancer treatments can affect a person's fertility, with these changes being temporary or permanent. Whether fertility is affected depends on factors such as a person's baseline fertility, age at the time of treatment, the type of cancer and treatment(s), the amount (dose) of treatment, the duration of treatment, the amount of time that has passed since cancer treatment, and other personal health factors.

Cancer treatments may harm reproductive organs and glands that control fertility. Chemotherapy (especially alkylating agents) can affect a female's ovaries, causing them to stop releasing eggs and estrogen, and can damage sperm and sperm-forming cells (germ cells) in young men. Radiation therapy to or near the abdomen, pelvis, or spine can harm nearby reproductive organs. Radiation therapy to the brain can damage the pituitary gland, which controls the function of most other endocrine glands. Surgery for cancers of the reproductive system and for cancers in the pelvic region can harm nearby reproductive tissues and/or nerves or lymph nodes. Hormone therapy (also called endocrine therapy) used to treat cancer can disrupt the menstrual cycle, which may affect female fertility. Hematopoietic stem cell transplantation involves receiving high doses of chemotherapy and/or radiation that may damage a female's ovaries and a male's sperm and sperm-forming cells.

The American Society of Clinical Oncology encourages oncologists to discuss the possibility of treatment-related infertility, as well as options for preserving fertility, with all people of reproductive age and to provide them with referrals to reproductive specialists.

==== Females ====
Females with cancer have fertility preservation options such as oocyte cryopreservation (also called egg cryopreservation or egg freezing), embryo cryopreservation (also called embryo banking or embryo freezing), ovarian shielding (also called gonadal shielding), ovarian tissue cryopreservation (also called ovarian tissue freezing), ovarian transposition (also called oophoropexy), and radical trachelectomy (also called radical cervicectomy).

==== Males ====
Males with cancer have fertility preservation options such as semen cryopreservation (also called sperm banking); testicular shielding (also called gonadal shielding), a procedure in which a protective cover is placed on the outside of the body to shield the testicles from scatter radiation to the pelvis when other parts of the body are being treated with radiation; testicular sperm extraction (TESE), a procedure for males who are not able to produce a semen sample; and testicular tissue freezing (also called testicular tissue cryopreservation) which, for boys who have not gone through puberty and are at high risk of infertility, may be an option.

== Prognosis ==
Adolescents and young adults with cancer have not attained the same improvements in overall survival as either younger children or older adults. The 5-year survival rate for all invasive adolescent and young adult cancers diagnosed from 2002 to 2006 in the United States was 82.5%. While this survival rate is comparable to those for children and older adults with cancer during the same time period, survival figures favor younger people with cancer with several cancer types common in both children and adolescent and young adult populations, including acute lymphomas, rhabdomyosarcoma, and Ewing sarcoma. Likewise, older people with cancer fared better than adolescents and young adults in terms of 5-year survival for breast cancer, Kaposi sarcoma, and anal cancer.

To improve low survival rates for some adolescent and young adult cancers, researchers are studying distinct genetic and biologic features of cancer at different ages, differences in treatment approaches and treatment intensity, and possible differences in compliance to treatment, as well as social, behavioral, or other factors affecting young people with cancer.

Adolescent and young adult with cancer and survivors of cancer report difficulties related to employment, educational attainment, and financial stability—as well as social relationships.

=== Differences ===
Cancer in adolescents and young adults often differs in terms of signs and symptoms, histology, prognosis, and rates of survivals. Some cancers in adolescents and young adults may have unique genetic and biological features.

For example:

- Colorectal cancer: Adolescents and young adults tend to have poorer cellular differentiation, differences in histology, more lymphovascular invasion, and signet ring cells. Often, colorectal cancers are found at more advanced tumor stages in adolescents and young adults.
- Breast cancer: Adolescents and young adults often have higher grade tumors, larger primary tumors, and a greater propensity for triple-negative breast cancer. Adolescents and young adults with breast cancer generally have a worse prognosis than older women.
- Acute lymphoblastic leukemia: Genetic alterations found in AYAs (adolescents and young adults) are associated with higher rates of treatment failure and relapse. Genomic abnormalities associated with high survivals rates are less likely in AYAs than in younger people, and genetic abnormalities associated with a poorer outcome tend to be more common.
- Melanoma: Localized melanoma in AYAs may have clinically different features than in older adults. Adolescents and young adults also tend to have higher stages of melanoma at diagnosis. Younger age at diagnosis and high mitotic rate may correlate with a greater likelihood of metastasis to the lymph nodes.
- Sarcoma: Adolescents and young adults often fare worse than young children with the same histologic type of sarcoma. In Ewing sarcoma, survival is inversely related to age and tumor size diagnosis. Adolescents and young adults with rhabdomyosarcoma have a much lower survival rate at 5 years than children, 27% compared with 61%.

A stronger understanding of the different biologic and genomic processes seen in some adolescent and young adult cancers will help to develop new and better treatments for these cancers.

=== Education ===
People who reported their cancer treatment was "very intensive" and those who had quit work or school after being diagnosed were more likely to report that cancer negatively affected their work and school after diagnosis, with more than 50% reporting problems with memory and attentiveness. Almost three-quarters of adolescents and young adults with cancer who had been studying or working returned to school or work within one to three years after a diagnosis. Reasons for educational disruption and lower educational attainment given by adolescents and young adults in qualitative interviews included missing school, not taking required tests, and feeling as if they had been "left behind."

=== Employment ===
Roughly a third of young adults in the United States reported that cancer had a negative impact on their employment plans. In research that compared young people who had survived cancer with their healthy peers, 33% of adolescents and young adults with cancer were not working compared to 27% of controls. In another US study, 23% of adolescents and young adults with cancer reported unemployment due to health issues compared with 14% of controls. Another national study found that adolescents and young adults who had had cancer reported lower family incomes than their peer-age cohorts without cancer.

=== Relationships and social needs ===
Social relationships and educational achievements during the formative adolescent and young adult years are very important, and studies in the United States have documented that a cancer experience can negatively affect the attainment of these goals. Marriage rates were lower among young adults with cancer, and they were more likely to have divorced or separated than peers in an age-related control group. Adolescents and young adults also reported fears about sexual attractiveness due to physical changes as well as fertility-related changes caused by cancer. Young people with cancer whose diagnosis is delayed or takes longer are at increased risk of anxiety, depression and reduced quality of life.

Adolescents and young adults with cancer expressed a strong desire to connect with other young adults with cancer and survivors from cancer who may have gone through similar experiences for support to cope with these challenges. Young cancer patients have reported an improvement in their coping abilities due to their participation in an online cancer community. Adolescents and young adults with cancer reported using social media platforms for both "medical and social resources", assisting with relationships and social issues. They also reported a preference for "tools that facilitate emotional coping of patients and their family." In general, the uses of social media for healthcare communication include reducing stigma and facilitating dialogue between patients.

According to the European Society for Medical Oncology, cancer patients participating in an online support group reported greater "psycho-social impact—alleviation of seclusion versus induction of anxiety."

== Epidemiology ==
During the period from 2000 to 2011, of 40 cancers that are relatively common in both adolescents and young adults in the United States, 7 increased in frequency: acute lymphoblastic leukemia, colorectal cancer, prostate cancer, kidney cancer, testicular cancer, thyroid cancer, and uterine cancer.

Rates of some cancers such as lung cancer and melanoma decreased among adolescents and young adults in the United States during this period. One hypothesis for this decline is the launching of prevention campaigns, such as smoking prevention and skin cancer awareness. Cervical cancer also declined among adolescents and young adults in the United States, which may be attributable to the introduction of the HPV vaccine. In contrast, rates among older adults declined in 26 types of cancer that also affect adolescents and young adults. Rates among older adults increased only in cancers of the thyroid, kidney, liver, and small intestine.

== See also ==
- Childhood cancer
