= Gender-affirming hormone therapy =

Gender-affirming medical treatment

Gender-affirming hormone therapy (GAHT), also known as hormone replacement therapy (HRT) or transgender hormone therapy, is a form of hormone therapy in which sex hormones and other hormonal medications are administered to transgender or gender nonconforming individuals for the purpose of more closely aligning their secondary sexual characteristics with their gender identity. This form of hormone therapy is given as one of two types, based on whether the goal of treatment is masculinization or feminization:

- Masculinizing hormone therapy – for transgender men or transmasculine people; consists of androgens and occasionally antiestrogens.
- Feminizing hormone therapy – for transgender women or transfeminine people; consists of estrogens with or without antiandrogens.

Eligibility for GAHT may require an assessment for gender dysphoria or persistent gender incongruence; many medical institutions now use an informed consent model, which ensures patients are informed of the procedure process, including possible benefits and risks, while removing many of the historical barriers needed to start hormone therapy. Treatment guidelines for therapy have been developed by several medical associations. However, many transgender people of all ages safely obtain and administer hormone therapy to themselves (DIY transgender hormone therapy) without recourse to institutional 'gatekeepers'. This helps them to overcome legal barriers to care, and to obtain higher, more effective dosages and a wide range of medications.

Non-binary people may also engage in hormone therapy in order to achieve a desired balance of sex hormones or to help align their bodies with their gender identities. Many transgender people obtain hormone replacement therapy from a licensed health care provider, while others obtain and self-administer hormones.

== Requirements ==
The formal requirements to begin gender-affirming hormone therapy vary widely depending on geographic location and specific institution. Gender-affirming hormones can be prescribed by a wide range of medical providers including, but not limited to, primary care physicians, endocrinologists, and gynecologists. Requirements to be prescribed these hormones generally include a minimum age. According to the Endocrine Society, there has been little research on taking cross-sex hormones before the age of about 14.

Historically, many health centers required a psychiatric evaluation and/or a letter from a therapist before beginning hormone replacement therapy. Many centers now use an informed consent model that does not require any routine formal psychiatric evaluation, but rather focuses on reducing barriers to care while ensuring a person can understand the risks and benefits of treatment. Some LGBT health organizations, including Chicago's Howard Brown Health Center and Planned Parenthood, advocate for this type of informed consent model.

The World Professional Association for Transgender Health (WPATH) Standards of Care, 7th edition, note that both of these approaches to care are appropriate.

=== Gender dysphoria ===
Many international guidelines and institutions require persistent, well-documented gender dysphoria as a pre-requisite to starting gender-affirmation therapy. Gender dysphoria refers to the psychological discomfort or distress that an individual can experience if their sex assigned at birth is incongruent with that person's gender identity. Signs of gender dysphoria can include comorbid mental health stressors such as depression, anxiety, low self-esteem, and social isolation. Not all gender nonconforming individuals experience gender dysphoria, and measuring a person's gender dysphoria is critical when considering medical intervention for gender nonconformity.

== Treatment options ==
=== Guidelines ===
For transgender youth, the Dutch protocol existed as among the earlier guidelines for hormone therapy by delaying puberty until age 16. The World Professional Association for Transgender Health (WPATH) and the Endocrine Society later formulated guidelines that created a foundation for health care providers to care for transgender patients. UCSF guidelines are also sometimes used. There is no generally agreed-upon set of guidelines, however.

National and regional guidance also exists in several countries. In Canada, Rainbow Health Ontario publishes primary-care guidelines for gender-affirming care with trans and non-binary patients. In Australia, the Australian Informed Consent Standards of Care for Gender Affirming Hormone Therapy are recognised as an Accepted Clinical Resource by the Royal Australian College of General Practitioners. In New Zealand, adult primary-care initiation guidelines for gender-affirming hormone therapy were released in 2023 and endorsed by the Royal New Zealand College of General Practitioners. France's Haute Autorité de santé has published practice guidelines for the care of transgender adults. In German-speaking countries, adult care may refer to the AWMF S3 guideline on gender incongruence, gender dysphoria and trans health. In Japan, the Japanese Society of Psychiatry and Neurology issues guidelines on the diagnosis and treatment of gender incongruence.

=== Delaying puberty in adolescents ===
Tanner stages for female sexual characteristics

Tanner stages for male sexual characteristics

Adolescents experiencing gender dysphoria may opt to undergo puberty-suppressing hormone therapy at the onset of puberty. The Standards of Care set forth by WPATH recommend individuals pursuing puberty-suppressing hormone therapy wait until at least experiencing Tanner Stage 2 pubertal development. Tanner Stage 2 is defined by the appearance of scant pubic hair, breast bud development, and/or slight testicular growth. WPATH classifies puberty-suppressing hormone therapy as a "fully reversible" intervention. Delaying puberty allows individuals more time to explore their gender identity before deciding on more permanent interventions and prevents the physical changes associated with puberty.

The preferred puberty-suppressing agent for both individuals assigned male at birth and individuals assigned female at birth is a GnRH Analogue. This approach temporarily shuts down the Hypothalamic-Pituitary-Gonadal (HPG) Axis, which is responsible for the production of hormones (estrogen, testosterone) that cause the development of secondary sexual characteristics in puberty.

According to a study by JAMA Pediatrics published in January 2025, less than 0.1% of adolescents covered by private medical insurance in the US take gender-affirming medication to treat gender dysphoria.

=== Feminizing hormone therapy ===
Feminizing hormone therapy is typically used by transgender women, who desire the development of feminine secondary sex characteristics. Individuals who identify as non-binary may also opt-in for feminizing hormone treatment to better align their body with their desired gender expression. Feminizing hormone therapy usually includes medication to suppress testosterone production and induce feminization. Types of medications include estrogens, antiandrogens (testosterone blockers), and progestogens. Most commonly, an estrogen is combined with an antiandrogen to suppress and block testosterone. This allows for demasculinization and promotion of feminization and breast development. Estrogens are administered in various modalities including injection, transdermal patch, transdermal spray, transdermal gel, and oral tablets. Estrogen pills are typically taken twice daily. Transdermal patches can either be changed once a week or twice a week, but must be worn at all times.

The desired effects of feminizing hormone therapy focus on the development of feminine secondary sex characteristics. These desired effects include: breast tissue development, redistribution of body fat, decreased body hair, reduction of muscle mass, and more. The table below summarizes some of the effects of feminizing hormone therapy in transgender women:

Effects of feminizing hormone therapy
Effect	Time to expected onset of effect (Note: Estimates represent published and unpublished clinical observations.)	Time to expected maximum effect (Note: Time at which further changes are unlikely at maximum maintained dose. Maximum effects vary widely depending on genetics, body habitus, age, and status of gonad removal. Generally, older individuals with intact gonads may have less feminization overall.)	Permanency if hormone therapy is stopped
Breast development and nipple/areolar enlargement	2–6 months	1–5 years	Permanent
Thinning/slowed growth of facial/body hair	4–12 months	>3 years (Note: Complete removal of male facial and body hair requires electrolysis, laser hair removal, or both. Temporary hair removal can be achieved with shaving, epilating, waxing, and other methods.)	Reversible
Cessation/reversal of male-pattern scalp hair loss	1–3 months	1–2 years (Note: Familial scalp hair loss may occur if estrogens are stopped.)	Reversible
Softening of skin/decreased oiliness and acne	3–6 months	Unknown	Reversible
Redistribution of body fat in a feminine pattern	3–6 months	2–5 years	Reversible
Decreased muscle mass/strength	3–6 months	1–2 years (Note: Varies significantly depending on the amount of physical exercise.)	Reversible
Widening and rounding of the pelvis (Note: Occurs only in individuals of pubertal age who have not yet completed epiphyseal closure.)	Unspecified	Unspecified	Permanent
Changes in mood, emotionality, and behavior	Unspecified	Unspecified	Reversible
Decreased sex drive	1–3 months	Temporary	Reversible
Decreased spontaneous/morning erections	1–3 months	3–6 months	Reversible
Erectile dysfunction and decreased ejaculate volume	1–3 months	Variable	Reversible
Decreased sperm production/fertility	Unknown	>3 years	Reversible or permanent (Note: Additional research is needed to determine permanency, but a permanent impact of estrogen therapy on sperm quality is likely and sperm preservation options should be counseled on and considered before initiation of therapy.)
Decreased testicle size	3–6 months	2–3 years	Unknown
Decreased penis size	None (Note: Conflicting reports, with none reported observed in transgender women but significant albeit minor reduction of penis size reported in those with prostate cancer on androgen deprivation therapy.)	Not applicable	Not applicable
Voice changes	None (Note: Treatment by speech pathologists for voice training and voice feminization surgery is effective.)	Not applicable	Not applicable

Footnotes and sources
Footnotes:
Sources: Guidelines: Reviews/book chapters: Studies:

=== Masculinizing hormone therapy ===
Masculinizing hormone therapy is typically used by transgender men, who desire the development of masculine secondary sex characteristics. Masculinizing hormone therapy usually includes testosterone to produce masculinization and suppress the production of estrogen. Treatment options include oral, subcutaneous injections or implant, and transdermal (patches, gels). Dosing is patient-specific, depending on the patient's rate of metabolism, and is discussed with the physician. The most commonly prescribed methods are intramuscular and subcutaneous injections. This dosing can be daily, weekly or biweekly depending on the route of administration and the individual patient.

Unlike feminizing hormone therapy, individuals undergoing masculinizing hormone therapy do not usually require additional hormone suppression such as estrogen suppression. Therapeutic doses of testosterone are usually sufficient to inhibit the production of estrogen to desired physiologic levels.

The desired effects of masculinizing hormone therapy focus on the development of masculine secondary sex characteristics. These desired effects include: increased muscle mass, increased bone turnover, development of facial hair, voice deepening, increase and thickening of body hair, and more.

Effects of masculinizing hormone therapy
Effect	Time to expected onset of effect	Time to expected maximum effect	Permanency if hormone therapy is stopped	Sources
Skin oiliness and acne	1-6 months	1–2 years	Reversible	
Facial and body hair growth	1-12 months	1-5 years	Permanent	
Scalp hair loss	6-12 months	Variable	Permanent	
Increased muscle mass	6-12 months	2-5 years	Reversible	
Body fat redistribution	1-6 months	2-5 years	Reversible	
Cessation of menses	1-6 months	None	Permanent on long-term hormone therapy	
Clitoral enlargement	1-12 months	1-2 years	Permanent	
Deepened voice	1-12 months	1-2 years	Permanent	
Increased sex drive	Variable	Variable	Reversible	

== Safety ==
Hormone therapy for transgender individuals has been shown in medical literature to be generally safe, when supervised by a qualified medical professional. There are potential risks with hormone treatment that will be monitored through screenings and lab tests such as blood count (hemoglobin), kidney and liver function, blood sugar, potassium, and cholesterol. Taking more medication than directed may lead to health problems such as increased risk of cancer, heart attack from thickening of the blood, blood clots, and elevated cholesterol. Hormone therapy has been shown to improve the psychosocial well-being, and lower levels of distress among transgender individuals.

Cardiovascular risks vary by hormone regimen, dose, route of administration, age, smoking status, and other individual risk factors. Estrogen therapy is associated with concern about venous thromboembolism, while testosterone therapy may affect cardiovascular risk factors such as blood pressure, lipids, weight, and erythrocytosis. A 2025 Dutch cohort study found that cardiovascular risk patterns differed between transgender women and transgender men receiving gender-affirming hormone therapy: transgender women did not have increased arterial cardiovascular risk compared with general-population men, but had increased venous thromboembolism risk, while transgender men had increased risks of myocardial infarction and ischaemic cerebrovascular accident compared with general-population women.

=== Feminizing hormone therapy ===
The Standards of Care published by the World Professional Association for Transgender Health (WPATH) summarize many of the risks associated with feminizing hormone therapy (outlined below).

Summary of risks of estrogen therapy
Likely increased risk	Possible increased risk	Inconclusive/no increased risk
Venous thromboembolic disease	Type 2 diabetes	Breast cancer
Cardiovascular disease	Hypertension	Prostate cancer
Hypertriglyceridemia	Hyperprolactinaemia	
Gallstones	Osteoporosis	
Hyperkalemia (Note: Only present in individuals taking spironolactone)		
Cerebrovascular disease		
Polyuria (or dehydration) (Note: Only present in individuals taking spironolactone)		
Meningioma (Note: Only present in individuals taking cyproterone-based anti-androgens)		

=== Masculinizing hormone therapy ===
The Standards of Care published by the World Professional Association for Transgender Health (WPATH) summarize many of the risks associated with masculinizing hormone therapy (outlined below).

Summary of risks of testosterone therapy
Likely increased risk	Possible increased risk	Inconclusive/no increased risk
Polycythemia	Type 2 diabetes	Osteoporosis
Weight gain		Breast cancer
Acne		Ovarian cancer
Pattern hair loss		Uterine cancer
Hypertension		Cervical cancer
Sleep apnea		
Decreased HDL cholesterol		
Increased LDL cholesterol		
Cardiovascular disease		
Hypertriglyceridemia		

=== Fertility consideration ===
GAHT may limit fertility potential. Should a transgender individual choose to undergo gender-affirming surgery, their fertility potential is lost completely. Before starting any treatment, individuals may consider fertility issues and fertility preservation. Options include semen cryopreservation, oocyte cryopreservation, and ovarian tissue cryopreservation.

A study presented at ENDO 2019 (the Endocrine Society's conference) shows that even after one year of treatment with testosterone, a transgender man can preserve his fertility potential. A 2015 study demonstrated normal spermatogenesis in some transgender women who were long-term estrogen therapy patients. In other cases, there is some research showing effective restoration of fertility by alternative means than HRT cessation alone. Will Powers has demonstrated the effectiveness of clomifene in restoring spermatogenesis in trans women. His study also includes an in-depth description of other methods for fertility restoration.

=== Gene expression ===
Some molecular biology research suggests that GAHT induces a "unique molecular profile" with potential relevance to the recipient's immune system, or (in)susceptibility to certain health conditions (which are sometimes sexually dimorphic in people); one 2022 analysis found that GAHT (both feminizing and masculinizing) influenced gene expression. The study's lead author stated that they observed "changes [to] the epigenetic landscape of DNA" in some regions but not others, and that of the observed "epigenetic changes in regions of DNA that were distinct between sexes before hormone therapy, these regions consistently shifted towards the profile of the affirmed gender after 12 months of hormone therapy." A 2023 molecular study on the breast tissue of transgender men found that adding androgens induced such changes, appearing to silence genes across the breast tissue, including a suppression of genes linked to breast cancer.

=== Counterfeit products ===
Some online scammers have been targeting trans consumers with products that do not contain any hormones or contain ones that are opposite of what is advertised.

== Treatment eligibility ==
Many providers use informed consent, whereby someone seeking hormone therapy can sign a statement of informed consent and begin treatment without much gatekeeping. For other providers, eligibility is determined using major diagnostic tools such as ICD-11 or the Diagnostic and Statistical Manual of Mental Disorders (DSM) to classify a patient with gender dysphoria. The Endocrine Society requires physicians that diagnose gender dysphoria and gender incongruence to be trained in psychiatric disorders with competency in ICD-11 and DSM-5. The healthcare provider should also obtain a thorough assessment of the patient's mental health and identify potential psychosocial factors that can affect therapy.

=== WPATH Standards of Care ===
The WPATH Standards of Care, most recently published in 2022, outlines a series of guidelines which should be met before a patient should be allowed gender-affirming hormone therapy:

- Gender incongruence is marked and sustained
- Patient meets diagnostic criteria for gender incongruence prior to gender-affirming hormone treatment in regions where a diagnosis is necessary to access health care
- Patient has capacity to consent to hormone therapy treatment
- Other possible causes of apparent gender incongruence have been identified and excluded
- Mental health and physical conditions that could negatively impact the outcome of treatment have been assessed
- Understands the effect of gender-affirming hormone treatment on reproduction and they have explored reproductive options

The WPATH standards of care distinguish between gender-affirming hormone therapy, and hormone replacement therapy, with the latter referring to the replacement of endogenous hormones after a gonadectomy to prevent cardiovascular and musculoskeletal issues.

=== Readiness ===
Some organizations—but fewer than in the past—require that patients spend a certain period of time living in their desired gender role before starting hormone therapy. This period is sometimes called real-life experience (RLE).

In Sweden, for instance, patients seeking to access gender affirming healthcare must first undergo extended evaluations with psychiatric professionals, during which they must—without any form of medical transition—successfully live for one full year as their desired gender in all professional, social, and personal matters. Gender clinics are recommended to provide patients with wigs and breast prostheses for the endeavor. The evaluation additionally involves, if possible, meetings with family members and/or other individuals close to the patient. Patients may be denied care for any number of "psychosocial dimensions", including their choice of job or their marital status.

Transgender and gender non-conforming activists, such as Kate Bornstein, have asserted that RLE is psychologically harmful and is a form of "gatekeeping", effectively barring individuals from transitioning for as long as possible, if not permanently.

In September 2022, the World Professional Association for Transgender Health (WPATH) Standards of Care for the Health of Transgender and Gender Diverse People (SOC) Version 8 were released and removed the requirement of RLE for all gender-affirming treatments, including gender-affirming surgery.

== Accessibility ==
Some transgender people choose to self-administer hormone replacement medications, often because doctors have too little experience in this area, or because no doctor is available. Others self-administer because their doctor will not prescribe hormones without an approval letter from a psychotherapist. Many therapists require extended periods of continuous psychotherapy and/or real-life experience before they will write such a letter. Because many individuals must pay for evaluation and care out-of-pocket, costs can be prohibitive.

Access to medication can be poor even where health care is provided free. In a patient survey conducted by the United Kingdom's National Health Service in 2008, 5% of respondents acknowledged resorting to self-medication, and 46% were dissatisfied with the amount of time it took to receive hormone therapy. The report concluded in part: "The NHS must provide a service that is easy to access so that vulnerable patients do not feel forced to turn to DIY remedies such as buying drugs online with all the risks that entails. Patients must be able to access professional help and advice so that they can make informed decisions about their care, whether they wish to take the NHS or private route without putting their health and indeed their lives in danger." Self-administration of cross-gender hormones without medical supervision may have untoward health effects and risks.

== See also ==
- Gender-affirming surgery
- Hormone therapy
- Hormone replacement therapy
- Masculinizing hormone therapy
- Feminizing hormone therapy
