= Total body irradiation =

Form of radiotherapy

Total body irradiation (TBI) is a form of radiotherapy used primarily as part of the preparative regimen for haematopoietic stem cell (or bone marrow) transplantation. As the name implies, TBI involves irradiation of the entire body, though in modern practice the lungs are often partially shielded to lower the risk of radiation-induced lung injury. Total body irradiation in the setting of bone marrow transplantation serves to destroy or suppress the recipient's immune system, preventing immunologic rejection of transplanted donor bone marrow or blood stem cells. Additionally, high doses of total body irradiation can eradicate residual cancer cells in the transplant recipient, increasing the likelihood that the transplant will be successful.

== Dosage ==
Doses of total body irradiation used in bone marrow transplantation typically range from 10 to >12 Gy. For reference, an unfractionated (i.e. single exposure) dose of 4.5 Gy is fatal in 50% of exposed individuals without aggressive medical care. The 10-12 Gy is typically delivered across multiple fractions to minimise toxicities to the patient.

Early research in bone marrow transplantation by E. Donnall Thomas and colleagues demonstrated that this process of splitting TBI into multiple smaller doses resulted in lower toxicity and better outcomes than delivering a single, large dose. The time interval between fractions allows other normal tissues some time to repair some of the damage caused. However, the dosing is still high enough that the ultimate result is the destruction of both the patient's bone marrow (allowing donor marrow to engraft) and any residual cancer cells. Non-myeloablative bone marrow transplantation uses lower doses of total body irradiation, typically about 2 Gy, which do not destroy the host bone marrow but do suppress the host immune system sufficiently to promote donor engraftment.

== Usage in other cancers ==
In addition to its use in bone marrow transplantation, total body irradiation has been explored as a treatment modality for high-risk Ewing sarcoma. However, subsequent findings suggest that TBI in this setting causes toxicity without improving disease control, and TBI is not currently used in the treatment of Ewing sarcoma outside of clinical trials.

== Fertility ==
Total body irradiation results in infertility in most cases, with recovery of gonadal function occurring in 10−14% of females. The number of pregnancies observed after hematopoietic stem cell transplantation involving such a procedure is lower than 2%. Fertility preservation measures mainly include cryopreservation of ovarian tissue, embryos or oocytes. Gonadal function has been reported to recover in less than 20% of males after TBI.
