= Fertiprotekt =

German health network

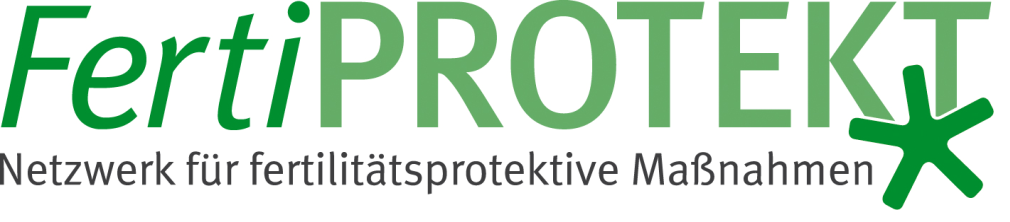

The Fertiprotekt network is a cooperation of university centres, hospitals and practices. It was founded in Germany in 2006. The network now extends to all German-speaking countries and currently units ca. 100 institutions in Germany, Austria and Switzerland.

== Aims ==
The aim of the network is to offer men and women the possibility of seeking advice about scientific information regarding their fertility before and after Chemo- or radiotherapy, and to undergo procedures to protect their fertility. The advice about and the performance of fertility-conserving procedures according to the network’s code of ethics is non-profit oriented.

== Background ==
As a result of today’s significantly improved prognosis for patients with cancer, quality of life is increasingly important after overcoming treatment of the disease. Fears about fertility preservation play an important role for young men and women. The most common types of cancer diagnosed under the age of 40 years are breast cancer, melanoma, cervical cancer, non-Hodgkin’s lymphoma and leukaemia. One of the biggest problems in women who have to undergo chemo- or radiotherapy is premature ovarian failure (premature ovarian insufficiency) and its associated infertility. For breast cancer alone, it is assumed that there are ca. 200 patients a year in Germany who wish to conceive. In men, chemotherapy can result in permanent damage to the testicular tissue. Due to advances in reproductive medicine, a variety of fertility-protective methods are now available. These techniques include administration of GnRH-agonists, ovarian stimulation with cryoconservation of fertilised or unfertilised oocytes, as well as cryoconservation of ovarian tissue. Relocation of the ovaries by surgically moving them out of the pelvis (ovarian transposition) to protect them from damage caused by radiotherapy is also possible.

== Activity ==
The Fertiprotekt network has carried out international pioneering work in four areas:

- National, comprehensive care structures in the area of fertility conservation have been created, which also serve as a role model for other countries.
- Treatment recommendations have been created, which allow a standardised and scientific approach.
- So-called luteal phase stimulation has been introduced, which allows hormonal stimulation to collect oocytes to be started at any time during the menstrual cycle. The procedure of egg-cell collection is therefore considerably shortened, and chemotherapy can be started earlier.
- The combination of ovarian tissue cryopreservation, directly followed by hormonal stimulation to collect egg cells for oocyte cryopreservation was first performed by centres in the network. This technique allows a significant increase in the chance of pregnancy.
- The first birth after transposition of ovarian tissue, which was transported to a central cryobank by overnight transport immediately after removal, was achieved by the network. This demonstrated that removed ovarian tissue can be centrally prepared and stored in specialised centres.

Network seminars take place annually. The centres involved are obliged to regularly take part in these annual conferences.

== Problems ==
Some methods, such as cryoconservation of sperm, as in a sperm bank, and in-vitro fertilisation (IVF) are well established. Others have only been introduced over the last few years, such as cryoconservation of ovarian tissue prior to chemotherapy for later transplantation and the cryoconservation of unfertilized egg cells. These services are therefore not fully covered by statutory health insurance in Germany.
