= Oncofertility =

Medical subfield

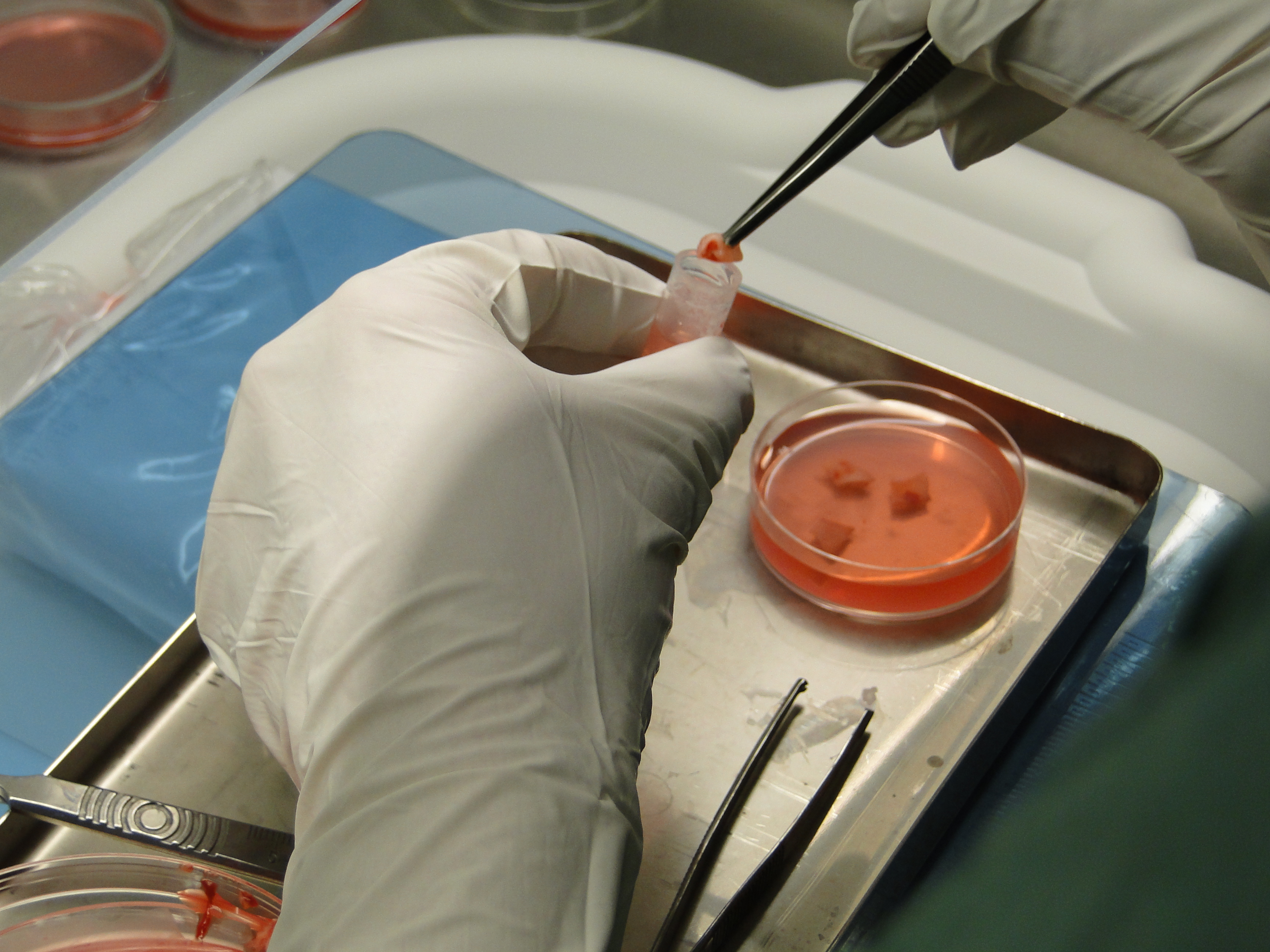
Placing ovarian tissue strips into the preserving solution

Oncofertility is a subfield that bridges oncology and reproductive research to support fertility preservation in cancer survivors. Cancer treatments, such as chemotherapy, radiation, and surgery, may reduce or destroy a person's ability to have children later in life. Oncofertility also encompasses reproductive issues after cancer treatment, such as family planning, complex contraception, hormonal management throughout survivorship, surrogacy, and adoption. As of 2024, oncofertility services are available in most countries outside of Africa.

About 10% of people being treated for cancer are younger than age 40 at the time of diagnosis. As cancer death rates decrease, the preservation of fertility in younger people becomes important to their post-treatment life plans. Preserving fertility prior to cancer treatment can provide hope at the time of diagnosis for families.

== Fertility options for men ==
Established fertility preservation options for men include sperm banking, in which a semen sample is produced, frozen, and stored for future use, and testicular sperm extraction, during which sperm is retrieved directly from the testes through a short surgical procedure and frozen. Experimental options include testicular tissue banking, in which testicular tissue is surgically removed and frozen.

Frozen sperm can be discarded if fertility resumes after treatment. About 10% of adult men who attempt to bank sperm are already infertile.

Men who do not preserve their fertility prior to cancer treatment may have children through donor sperm, using sperm from a known or anonymous donor to achieve a pregnancy with a female partner, or by using assisted reproductive technologies or adoption.

== Fertility options for women ==
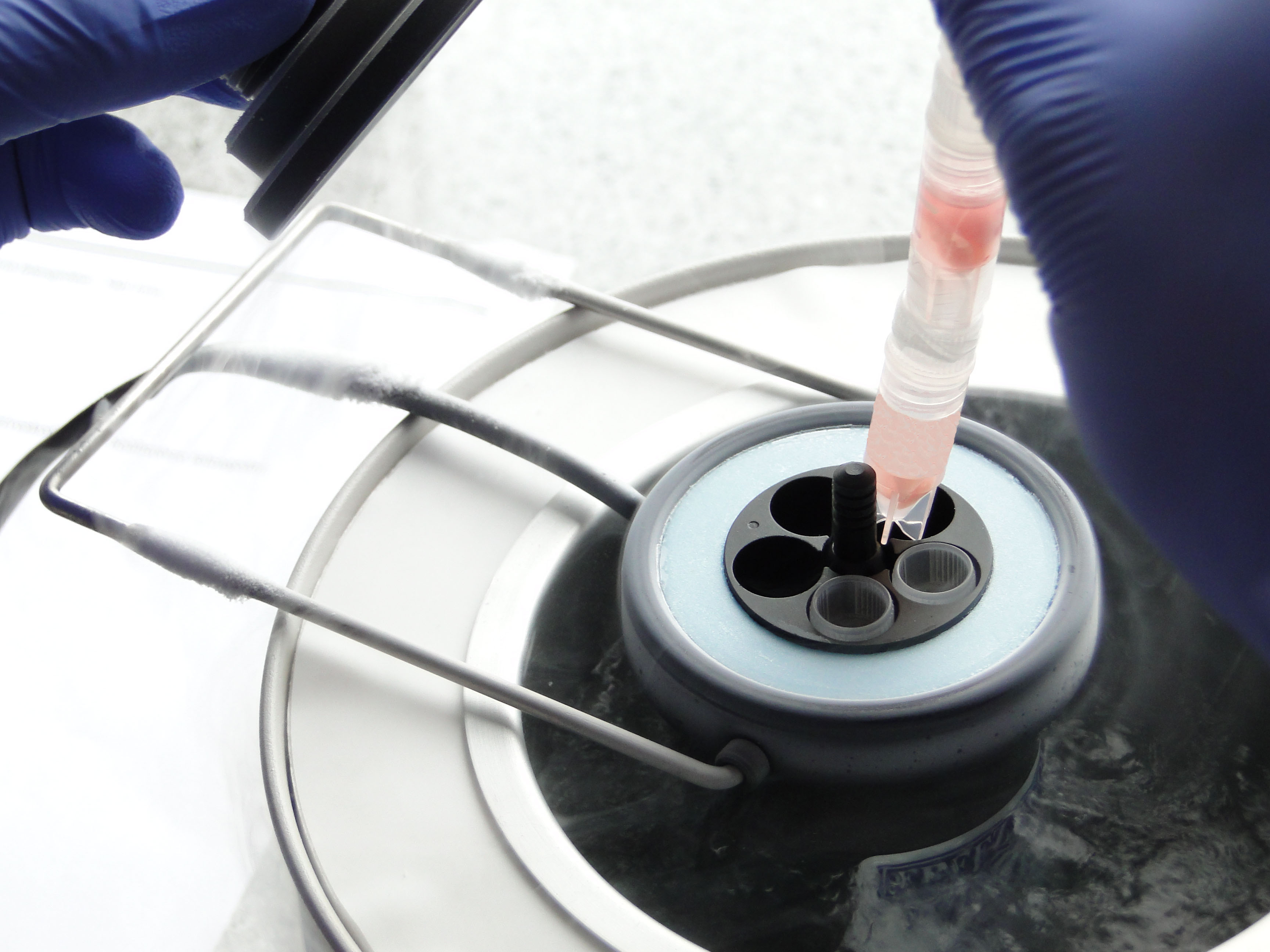
Cryopreserving ovarian tissue strips

Options for women to have children after cancer have increased significantly in recent years. Women should be counseled on established options such as embryo banking in which hormonal stimulation causes the production of multiple eggs, which are removed, fertilized by sperm, and frozen for future use.

Egg banking is a process of extracting and freezing unfertilized eggs. It uses hormonal stimulation to trigger the production of multiple eggs, which are surgically removed and frozen for storage and future use. The success rate for is lower than most women expect, requiring, on average, about 10 frozen eggs to be used for each live birth.

For protection from radiation, ovarian transposition and ovarian shielding (physically shielding the ovaries from the area receiving radiation) may be used. Ovarian transposition is a surgical intervention to move the ovaries above and to the side of the central pelvic area, away from the radiation field. The preferred surgical approach is minimally invasive laparoscopy.

Experimental techniques include ovarian tissue banking in which an ovary is surgically removed and frozen to be transplanted back into the woman when she is ready to have children. Scientists are also working on ways to mature undeveloped eggs from this ovarian tissue.

After sterilizing cancer treatment, permanent damage to the uterus could be sustained. A woman can also choose surrogacy (when a woman carries a pregnancy for another woman or couple) or adoption.

Recent efforts also investigate the implications of a cancer diagnosis during pregnancy.

== Fertility options for children ==
Prepubescent children have fewer options to preserve fertility than adults. These include testicular sperm extraction for males and ovarian tissue banking for females.

== Financial, ethical, and legal considerations ==
Fertility preservation costs may be high for young patients, and multiple organizations now provide methods to reduce costs for patients. For example, depending on how a country handles healthcare costs and health insurance, the cancer survivor may have to pay directly for the cost of storing frozen sperm.

The Supreme Court of the United States addressed the Social Security implications of oncofertility in March 2012 with Astrue v. Capato.

Research also investigates ethical issues in oncofertility, such as the decision-making process for adolescent children and their families.

== Name ==
The name was coined in 2006 by Teresa K. Woodruff of the Oncofertility Consortium.
