= Lisa Campo-Engelstein =

American bioethicist

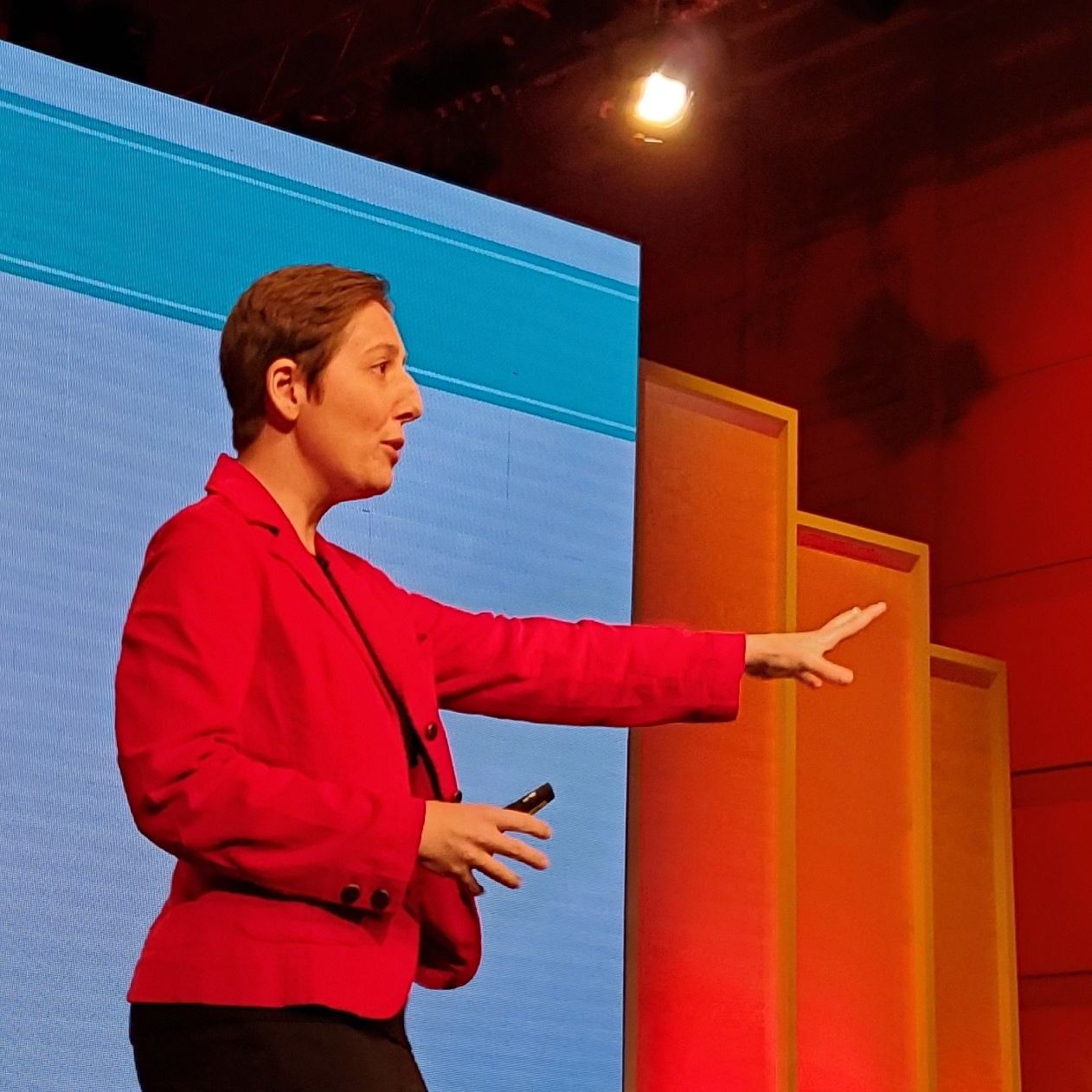
- Education: Michigan State University
- Occupations: bioethicist, Sexual Ethics, and fertility/contraceptive researcher
- Employer: University of Texas Medical Branch

Lisa Campo-Engelstein is an American bioethicist and fertility/contraceptive researcher. She currently works at the University of Texas Medical Branch as the Harris L. Kempner Chair in the Humanities in Medicine Professor, the Director of the Institute for Bioethics & Health Humanities, and an Associate Professor in Preventive Medicine and Population Health. She is also a feminist bioethicist specializing in reproductive ethics and sexual ethics. She has been recognized in the BBC's list of 100 inspiring and influential women from around the world for 2019.

== Education ==
Campo-Engelstein completed her bachelor’s degree in philosophy at Middlebury College in 2001, with a double major in philosophy and pre-med and a minor in sociology, followed by her master’s and PhD degrees in philosophy at Michigan State University in 2005 and 2009, respectively, with a focus on bioethics and feminist theory. She also obtained a graduate certificate in clinical ethics consultation from Albany Medical College in 2013. Afterwards she went on to obtain a postdoctoral fellowship with the Oncofertility Consortium at Northwestern University Feinberg School of Medicine.

== Research ==
Campo-Engelstein’s research focuses on various topics within reproductive ethics and sexual ethics, such as male contraception, fertility preservation, sexual organ transplant and extreme surgeries, abortion, queer bioethics, and rape. She consistently researches, writes, teaches, and speaks nationally on these topics, with prominent news focusing on her work in male contraceptives.

Some of her main projects are:

- Male Contraception: In 2019 she summarised the issues facing the development and use of a male contraceptive pill. Besides the technical difficulties there are other issues concerning whether a pill might be in line with the values men find important. She elucidates the complex intersection of science, gender norms, and societal expectations that have delayed the mass production of a male contraceptive pill. Campo-Engelstein highlights the paradox of contraceptive responsibility, which traditionally burdens women despite men's growing interest in hormonal contraceptives. She argues the scientific challenges associated with male contraception, such as hormonal side effects, are surmountable. Instead, she posits that the larger obstacles are socio-economic: perceived side effects, entrenched gender roles, and an historical focus on women's reproductive health. Her research suggests that gender evolution and an increased share of domestic and childcare responsibilities among men may lead to greater acceptance of male contraception. Campo-Engelstein's views prompt reflection on the need for an equitable distribution of contraceptive responsibilities, underpinning a call to action for the development and acceptance of the male contraceptive pill. She believes that after fifty years of waiting researchers should not wait another fifty years before launching a male pill.
- Queer Bioethics: She addresses the health care needs of LGBTQ patients, both within and outside of reproduction. She also conducted qualitative studies on LGBTQ individuals’ relationships with their physicians and elderly trans individuals’ experiences of health and aging. Lisa Campo-Engelstein illuminates the ethical landscape surrounding Transgender and Non-Binary (TGNB) reproduction in the realm of Assisted Reproductive Technologies (ART). She identifies the cisnormative infertility definitions and binary-gendered framework of reproductive medicine as barriers to TGNB access to ART. Further, she emphasizes the financial and socio-economic challenges linked with ART, which disproportionately affect TGNB individuals due to intersecting marginalized identities. Highlighting the lack of comprehensive data, Campo-Engelstein underscores the complexities of decision-making about gender-affirming and reproductive care. Lastly, she explores autonomy issues in fertility preservation decisions for TGNB youth. Campo-Engelstein's work provides crucial insight into the nexus of bioethics, gender identity, and reproductive technologies.
- Sexual Ethics: She conducted research and wrote papers on the ethics of rape and expedited partner therapy for STIs.

== Publications ==
Focusing her research in reproductive ethics, sexual ethics, and queer bioethics, she currently has over 60 peer-reviewed papers, more than a dozen book chapters, and is the co-editor of three books in reproductive ethics.

Campo-Engelstein has published over 50 peer-reviewed articles in journals such as The Hastings Center Report, The Journal of Law, Medicine & Ethics, The American Journal of Bioethics, The Journal of Sexual Medicine, The Journal of Clinical Ethics, The Journal of Medical Ethics, The Journal of Medicine & Philosophy, The Journal of Applied Philosophy, The Journal of Bioethical Inquiry, The Kennedy Institute of Ethics Journal, The International Journal of Feminist Approaches to Bioethics, Ethics & Behavior, Contraception, Fertility & Sterility, Human Reproduction Update, Journal of Assisted Reproduction & Genetics, Journal of Andrology, Journal of Urology, among others. She has also co-edited two books: Beyond Bioethics: Toward a New Biopolitics (with Osagie K. Obasogie) and Reproductive Ethics: New Challenges & Conversations (with Robert Klitzman).

Popular Books by Campo-Engelstein:

- Reproductive Ethics – New Challenges and Conversations
- Reproductive Ethics II: New Ideas and Innovations
- Oncofertility: Ethical, Legal, Social, and Medical Perspectives (Cancer Treatment and Research)

== Awards and honors ==
Campo-Engelstein received the BBC 100 Women 2019 award.
