= Teresa Woodruff =

American Reproductive Scientist

Teresa K. Woodruff
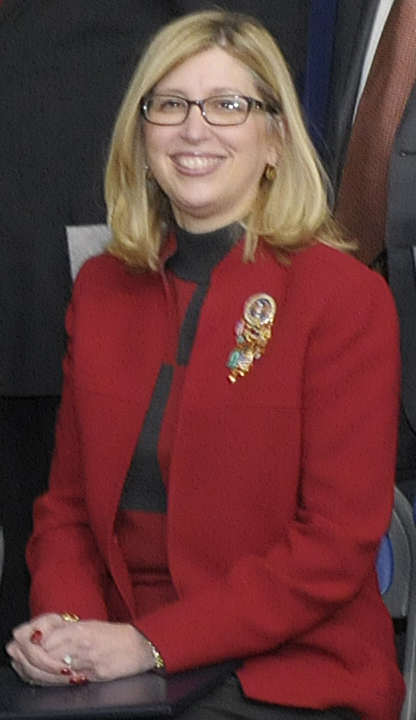
- Woodruff among 2011 PAESMEM honorees

President of Michigan State University
- In office 2022–2024
- Preceded by: Samuel L. Stanley Jr.
- Succeeded by: Kevin Guskiewicz

Provost of Michigan State University
- In office August 1, 2020 – November 4, 2022
- Preceded by: June Youatt
- Succeeded by: Thomas D. Jeitschko (interim)

Personal details
- Spouse: Thomas O'Halloran
- Education: Olivet Nazarene University (BS); Northwestern University (PhD)
- Scientific career
- Fields: Reproductive Biology, Obstetrics, Gynecology, Biomedical Engineering
- Workplaces: Northwestern University; Michigan State University

Teresa Kaye Woodruff is an American university administrator and medical researcher in human reproduction and oncology, with a focus on ovarian biology, endocrinology, and women's health. She is President Emerita of Michigan State University, having served as interim president from 2022 to 2024. Woodruff initially joined Michigan State University as the Provost and Executive Vice President for Academic Affairs in 2020. In 2025, she was a recipient of the National Medal of Science, the first person from Michigan State University to receive the honor.

Woodruff was previously Dean of the Graduate School and Professor in the McCormick School of Engineering at Northwestern University. She served as the Thomas J. Watkins Memorial Professor and Vice Chair for Research and Chief of the Division of Reproductive Science in Medicine in the Department of Obstetrics and Gynecology at the Feinberg School of Medicine at Northwestern University in Chicago, Illinois.

Woodruff is credited with coining the term oncofertility and founded the Oncofertility Consortium at Northwestern Memorial Hospital. She is also founder and chief of the Division of Fertility Preservation and founder and director of the Women's Health Research Institute at Northwestern University.

In 2026, she was elected to the American Philosophical Society and the Royal Society.

== Education ==
Woodruff graduated with a Bachelor of Science degree in Zoology and Chemistry from the Olivet Nazarene University in 1985. She was awarded the "O" Award in 2016, presented "to honor alumni who exhibit the characteristics and ideals of their alma mater." She completed her graduate study at Northwestern University, receiving a Ph.D. in Molecular Biology and Cell Biology in 1989. She was recognized by Northwestern with their highest honor for an alum, the Northwestern Alumni Association Merit Award in 2012.

She is the recipient of two honorary degrees (Honorary Scientiae Doctoris, i.e., D.Sc.), nationally from Bates College in Lewiston Maine (2010) and internationally from University of Birmingham, School of Medicine in Birmingham, UK (2016).

== Career ==
=== Ovarian biology research ===
In 1986, as a graduate student in the laboratory of Kelly Mayo at Northwestern University, Woodruff cloned the protein subunits that form the peptide hormones inhibin and activin. This work was recognized in 2000 by the Endocrine Society Weitzman Award, which is presented to "an exceptionally promising young clinical or basic investigator who has not reached the age of 50." After completing her doctorate in 1989, Woodruff completed a postdoctoral fellowship at Genentech, Inc in South San Francisco, CA, where she contributed to the development of inhibin and activin assays, which are used today for the diagnosis of Down syndrome and to measure the ovarian reserve. She is named as inventor on five patents based on her work at Genentech. Woodruff also continued her research into the physiology of inhibin and activin in pituitary and ovarian function in rodent and the effects of recombinant human inhibin and activin in primates.

Woodruff returned to Northwestern University as a faculty member in 1995 to study inhibin and activin actions and interactions within the pituitary-gonadal axis, characterizing the regulation of subunit assembly and ligand processing in the ovary, the ligands' role in paracrine regulation of folliculogenesis, and their signal transduction pathways in the regulation of follicle-stimulating hormone (FSH). In collaboration with Theodore Jardetzky, she solved the crystal structures of activin with its receptor and with its bioneutralizing binding protein follistatin. In 2015, her lab used in silico methods to design small molecule activin antagonists based on the structure of activin bound to its receptor.

Using single-cell elemental analytical methods at the Argonne National Laboratory in collaboration with inorganic chemist Tom O'Halloran, Woodruff discovered a role of zinc in the regulation of oocyte maturation and at the moment of fertilization. Using single-cell x-ray fluorescence, Woodruff and O'Halloran described the phenomenon of the "zinc spark," an event during which 10 billion zinc ions are lost from the egg. The discovery of the zinc spark was named as one of Discover magazine's top 100 stories of 2016.

=== Oncofertility research ===
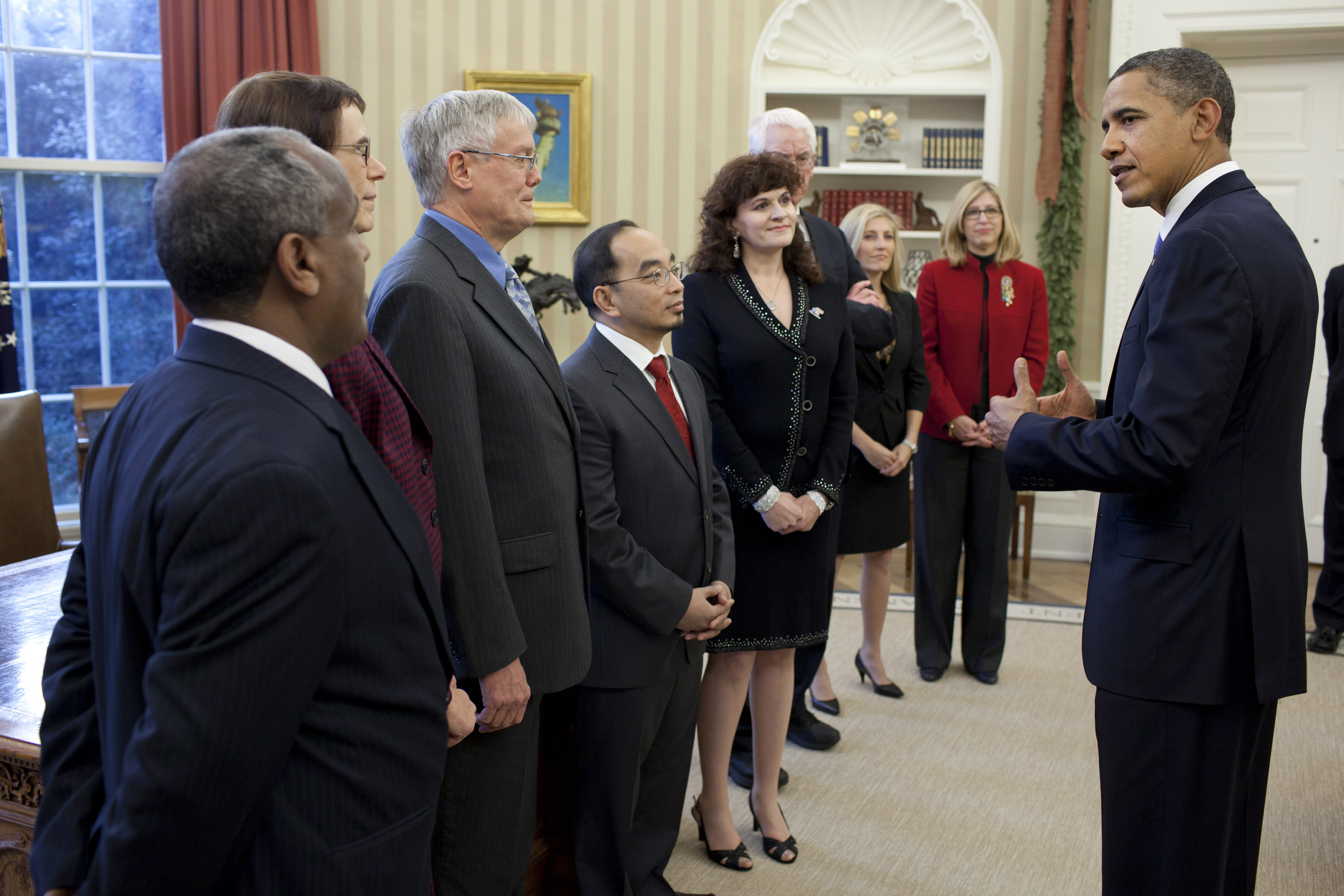
Woodruff (right) with President Barack Obama, representing an organizational recipient of the 2010 Presidential Awards for Excellence in Science, Mathematics and Engineering Mentoring

At Northwestern University, Woodruff led a highly collaborative effort that resulted in the development of a hydrogel that acts as a 3-dimensional support system for encapsulated in vitro culture of the ovarian follicle and its enclosed maturing oocyte (eIVFG). Live births in mice resulted from these studies, and this work was named as the most important breakthrough of the decade 1998-2008 by Nature Medicine. eIVFG methods were subsequently used to develop and test a microfluidic system that supports 28-day reproductive cycles ex vivo—an "ovarian cycle in a dish." On March 28, 2017, her team announced the creation of Evatar, a miniaturized female reproductive tract composed of ovarian follicles or intact ovaries (mouse) interconnected with human explants from fallopian tubes, uterus, and cervix with liver organoids to provide a metabolic management tissue system. Woodruff and team also recently created decellularized and 3D-printed ovarian bioprosthetics as replacement organs for women who have lost gonadal function. The development of an ovarian bioprosthetic was named as one of Discover magazine's 100 most important discoveries of 2018, and was recognized as a top five medical breakthrough by the Chinese Academy of Science. Her work to bridge the basic sciences and medicine was recognized with a Halo Award in 2018.

In 2006, Woodruff introduced the term oncofertility to describe the application of her work to meeting the fertility needs of young cancer patients and she has "been at the center of the movement ever since." With a $21.5-million National Institutes of Health Interdisciplinary Roadmap Grant awarded in 2007, she launched the Oncofertility Consortium, an interdisciplinary team of oncologists, fertility specialists, social scientists, educators, and policy makers dedicated to the clinical care of women at risk of losing their fertility because of cancer treatment. As part of the Oncofertility Consortium, Dr. Woodruff helped form the National Physicians Cooperative (NPC) to facilitate sharing of fertility preservation protocols and techniques between reproductive endocrinology practices and ensure that clinicians and patients receive up-to-date information about available treatment options.

=== Educational work ===
Woodruff has provided leadership in higher education for over 25 years. She was selected by the Michigan State University (MSU) Board of Trustees to serve as interim president in 2022. As chief executive of MSU, Woodruff focused on advancing the university's strategic initiatives, building trust, enabling excellence, and affirming transparency, clarity, and authenticity. She led multiple university strategic plans, including: MSU 2030: Empowering Excellence, Advancing Equity, and Expanding Impact; the Relationship Violence and Sexual Misconduct Plan; and the University Facilities and Use Strategic Plan. Her vision shifted the admissions process from 'major' to 'mission' and she enhanced the financial aid processes including approval of the Spartan Tuition Advantage program, offering financial aid that covers the full cost of tuition for qualifying students (~6000) from the state of Michigan. She also led the most ambitious expansion of physical spaces at the institution in decades, including a new teaching and learning dairy, greenhouses, the MSU Museum, a new plant science building, a multi-dimensional a multicultural center, a student-focused health and wellness center and an engineering and digital innovation center (EDIC). MSU was also been recognized during Woodruff's term with its largest one-year leap in U.S. News and World Report rankings (17 places upward) and named a top 14 public institution by The Wall Street Journal.

Prior to serving as interim president, Woodruff was named provost and executive vice president for academic affairs at MSU in 2020. Woodruff was responsible for the academic progression of over 51,000 students, the professional development of over 5,600 faculty and academic staff, and a multi-billion-dollar budget.

Prior to MSU, Woodruff served in governance roles for multiple societies, including as president of the Endocrine Society and on the council of the Society for the Study of Reproduction. She has held multiple senior academic roles including as associate provost of graduate education and dean of the Graduate School at Northwestern University.

Woodruff was named director of the newly formed Institute for Women's Health Research at Northwestern University, where she spearheaded advocacy and education on sex equity in biomedical research, the attrition of women from STEM fields, and the need for greater knowledge of basic science concepts among patients. Her call for sex equity in clinical trials was the subject of a 2014 interview with Lesley Stahl on 60 Minutes.

Woodruff also created the Women's Health Science Program (WHSP) for High School Girls & Beyond to provide science education programs to 9th -12th grade female students in Chicago Public Schools. WHSP runs four academies: the Oncofertility Saturday Academy (OSA), Cardiology Summer Academy (CSA), Infectious Disease Summer Academy (IDSA), and Physical Science Weekend Academy (PSWA). For this work, Woodruff was awarded the Presidential Award for Excellence in Science, Mathematics, and Engineering Mentoring in an Oval Office ceremony in 2011.

Woodruff created a series of videos for 8- to 12-year-olds covering topics such as puberty, menstruation, and anatomy; a MOOC for college students on reproductive health; and the Repropedia, a dictionary of reproductive science and health terms, created and updated by science and clinician contributors, for links to websites and social media to ensure accurate understanding of key terms by the public.

In 2015, Woodruff was named the Director of the Center for Reproductive Science at Northwestern University. In 2016, she founded the Masters of Science in Reproductive Science and Medicine program within the Center.

=== Awards and recognition ===
In 2025, Woodruff was a recipient of the National Medal of Science, the first person from Michigan State University to receive the honor. This was her second White House honor, having previously received the Presidential Award for Excellence in Science, Mathematics and Engineering Mentoring from President Barack Obama in 2010. She was awarded the Women's Health Visionary Award by the Society for Women's Health Research (SWHR) in 2025.

Woodruff holds 20 U.S. Patents. In 2017, she received a Guggenheim Award and was elected to the National Academy of Inventors. She was elected as a fellow to the National Academy of Medicine in 2018, and to the American Academy of Arts & Sciences in 2020. Woodruff is also an elected Fellow of the American Association for the Advancement of Science in 2005 as well as the American Institute for Medical and Biological Engineering in 2017. She was elected a Fellow of the Royal Society and the American Philosophical Society in 2026.

== Service ==
Woodruff has served on the school board of the Chicago-based Young Women's Leadership Charter School and as president of The Endocrine Society, and was selected as Editor-in-Chief of the journal Endocrinology in September 2017. Dr. Woodruff has also served with the Economic Club of Chicago since 2015 and as a member of the Board of Trustees of the Adler Planetarium since 2018.
