= In vitro maturation =

Artificial maturation of harvested immature egg cells

In vitro maturation (IVM) is the technique of letting the contents of ovarian follicles and the oocytes inside mature in vitro. It can be offered to women with infertility problems, combined with in vitro fertilization (IVF), offering women pregnancy without ovarian stimulation.

Follicular Development

== History ==
In 1935, Pincus & Enzmann did the first experiment on immature rabbit oocyte, showing in vitro spontaneous maturation and fertilization. They showed maturation occurs in isolation from normal follicular environment. In 1965 Edwards then continued IVM studies in mouse, sheep, cow, pig, rhesus monkey and human. By 1991, the first human pregnancy was recorded using IVM followed by IVF, and in 1994 the first birth using IVM oocytes from polyendocrine metabolic ovarian syndrome (PMOS) patients was recorded, confirming that their oocytes are capable of maturation.

== Background ==
Oogenesis takes place during embryonic life, in which primordial germ cells undergo mitosis until a few weeks prior to birth, forming oogonia. These then begin meiosis to form the oocyte within the primordial follicle. This follicle consists of the oocyte surrounded by flattened pregranulosa cells. Babies are born with 1-2 million primordial follicles, and by puberty have around 300,000. Of these primordial follicles, only around 400 mature oocytes are released and could be potentially fertilised, with the rest undergoing atresia.

'Maturation' of an oocyte is the process by which an 'oocyte attains the competence to be fertilised and undergo embryogenesis'.

Folliculogenesis is the mechanism by which the ovarian follicles mature. This can take many months in vivo and involves primordial follicle growth and differentiation.

Primordial follicles containing the primary oocyte, arrested at prophase of meiosis I, develop into primary follicle containing cuboidal granulosa cells. A secondary follicle is formed with a few granulosa cell layers, as well as a theca layer. Finally before ovulation, a tertiary follicle is formed containing a follicular-fluid filled antrum. Of these small antral follicles, 1 will become dominant and ovulate (in monoovulatory species). During ovulation, the primary oocyte will resume meiosis in response to signals, arresting in metaphase meiosis II, ready for fertilization. The dominant follicle contains the mature oocyte. Follicular development is directly under gonadotropins control, LH and FSH. These use cAMP as an intracellular second messenger, with growth factors and cytokines also influencing their development in vivo.

Through in vitro maturation, folliculogenesis and latter parts of oogenesis are being mimicked outside of the ovaries- trying to recreate the conditions for these processes.

== Techniques ==
If a follicle has reached the early tertiary or antral stage, IVM can be carried out.

Firstly, the oocytes need to be obtained from the subject. The timing of this is dependent on the stage of the cycle the subject is in, which is usually monitored using ultrasonography. If without the use of priming, oocytes are obtained when the largest follicles are around 10mm in size.

In humans, this can be done with an aspiration needle, using ultrasound to allow accuracy. Depending on whether you are aspirating mature or immature follicles, the protocol differs slightly. In both procedures the aspiration pressure is reduced, but to varying degrees. Additionally, it is more important that the aspirate is filtered when retrieving immature follicles, as the follicles are much smaller and harder to see in the fluid extracted.

Priming is the process by which the oocytes are primed with follicle-stimulating hormone (FSH) or human chorionic gonadotrophin (hCG) before retrieval. hCG is important in women with polyendocrine metabolic ovarian syndrome (PMOS). This results in an expanding or dispersed pattern of the cumulus oophorus around the egg cell, facilitating its identification within follicular fluid. This leads to improved maturation and quality of the oocytes. However, the evidence of a clinical effect of hCG priming is still lacking. When IVM was initially introduced, successful pregnancies were low, leading to the use of ovary priming.

This technique is also used in sheep, pigs and other animals. See In animals.

=== Oocytes classification ===
Oocytes are classified depending on their condition, such as number of cumulus cells. The best oocytes are chosen to be matured in the hope of then being implanted using in vitro fertilisation techniques.

=== Cultured in media ===
The oocytes are then cultured in media containing nutrients important for oocyte survival, such as gonadotrophins, growth factors and steroids. These vary between clinics and research laboratories. McLaughlin et al. biopsied human ovarian tissue and achieved a 10% rate of maturation from unilaminar follicles into metaphase II by a multi-step culture system:

- 8 days of culture in a serum-free medium
- 8 days of culture in a serum-free medium with activin A
- 4 days of culture on membranes with activin A and follicle-stimulating hormone (FSH).

=== In vitro fertilisation ===
Once the oocytes have sufficiently matured, they can then be fertilised in vitro, known as in vitro fertilisation (IVF). Techniques such as intracytoplasmic sperm injection (ICSI) can also be utilised to improve the chances of fertilisation being successful, which should be performed at least one hour (and optimally two to four hours) after the first polar body extrusion. Out of in vitro matured oocytes, those fertilised with ICSI have a success rates of 60-80%, compared to IVF with success rates of 25-40%.

A few live births have already been made by taking small early tertiary follicles, letting them mature in vitro and subsequently fertilizing them. However, for follicles that haven't reached the early tertiary stage, IVM is still under development. There are a lot of cellular changes in the oocyte and the rest of the cells in the follicle, which makes it very susceptible. Nevertheless, it is possible to let a primordial follicle mature to a secondary follicle outside the body by growing it in a slice of ovarian tissue. The subsequent maturity from secondary to early tertiary stage can then be supported in test-tubes. It has been suggested that photoirradiation of granulosa cells and oocytes may facilitate IVM.

== Clinical applications ==
In vitro maturation is an assistive reproductive technique (ART) typically used in patients with fertility issues including polyendocrine metabolic ovarian syndrome (PMOS), high antral follicle counts and ovarian hyper-responsiveness. However, more recently IVM has also become widely utilised in areas such as fertility preservation in cancer patient who have undergone treatment involving gonadotoxic therapies. There have been over 1000 live births recorded from mothers using IVM.

=== Polyendocrine metabolic ovarian syndrome (PMOS) ===
Polyendocrine metabolic ovarian syndrome (PMOS) is a common disorder involving dysfunction of the endocrine system associated with female reproduction. PMOS involves discrepancies in the Hyphophyseal-pituitary-gonadal endocrine axis which can result in hormonal dysfunction, excess androgens (e.g. testosterone) and frequent anovulatory menstrual cycles. Therefore, it is common for women suffering from PMOS to require assistance in order to conceive. In these patients IVM can be used to mature oocytes and aid conception. Few studies shows that substituting IVM in PMOS patients eliminates the risk of OHSS and lowers the cost of treatment. The same group conducted a retrospective analysis study to compare the treatment outcome of IVM with IVF in patients with PMOS.They have further concluded there was significant increase pregnancy rates, implantation rates and number of embryos transferred in IVM group.

=== Alternative to ovarian hyperstimulation ===
The use of in vitro maturation in assisted reproduction has advantages over standard ART procedures. In typical IVF practice, controlled ovarian hyperstimulation is performed, which is where supraphysiological levels of gonadotropins are administered to the patient in order to hyperstimulate the antral follicles and hence induce oocyte maturation to metaphase II at a rate that is above normal physiological capabilities. This practice can be disadvantageous in several ways: It is very costly, can become complicated and may also predispose to several undesirable side effects, such as ovarian hyperstimulation syndrome (OHSS). Ovarian hyperstimulation can cause severe OHSS in up to 2% of cases. OHSS can have serious consequences, including respiratory problems, renal impairment and even stroke. Patients with PMOS and younger women are at an increased risk of OHSS. In these women, it may be even more beneficial to employ IVM rather than conventional IVF treatment.

In IVM, immature oocytes are removed from the antral follicle of a woman and then are matured in vitro in a culture rich in gonadotrophins. This hence negates (or significantly reduces) the need for gonadotrophin stimulation.

IVM is not an entirely perfected technique. Pregnancy rates are lower in IVM than in standard IVF. There is also research required into whether or not babies born to mothers who have undergone IVM have any health concerns (e.g. developmental issues) later in life.

Women with a personal or family history of an oestrogen associated thrombus, or of severe cardiovascular disease, may also benefit from IVM. This is because conventional IVF, with its hyperstimulation of the ovaries, has the potential to stimulate mass synthesis of oestrogen via the stimulation of granulosa cell oestrogen production.

==== Ovarian tissue cryopreservation ====
Ovarian tissue cryopreservation can be used as a method of fertility preservation, such as before undergoing chemotherapy that can cause female infertility, or as a future resource in case the oocytes will stop functioning by advanced maternal age. Thus, ovarian tissue cryopreservation is an alternative to oocyte cryopreservation which requires a preceding controlled ovarian hyperstimulation. In vitro maturation allows oocytes from the ovarian tissue to be used directly for in vitro fertilization, as an alternative to surgical re-insertion of the tissue into the body.

=== Empty follicle syndrome ===
IVM may also be an important consideration for female patients diagnosed with empty follicle syndrome (EFS). In EFS, no oocytes are retrieved from mature ovarian follicles despite the application of high levels of gonadotrophins. A woman can be diagnosed with EFS after she has undergone multiple rounds of IVF with total (or near total) failure in each round.

=== Rescue ===
Rescue IVM is a variant of classical in vitro maturation that involves attempting to mature immature oocytes that have been removed from a patient secondary to ovarian hyperstimulation in standard IVF practice. Therefore, allowing for more oocytes to mature to the developmental stage where they can be developmentally viable. However, rescue IVM has been considered a controversial field: If oocytes have not matured sufficiently in vivo – despite exposure to significant levels of gonadotrophins – it may be indicative of dysmaturity and of a limited potential developmentally.

== In animals ==
IVM has also been used in domestic animals including mice, cats, dogs, swine, sheep, horse and cattle as well as wild species such as buffalo, bison, fish, lions, tigers and leopards. The ability to recover animals' oocytes initially destined for ovarian follicle atresia, can be utilized by researchers, conservationists and the agriculture industry for academic purposes or for improving breeding systems.

In research, IVM can be carried out on animals so as to understand the developmental capacities of oocytes under certain conditions, or to understand the specific reproductive biology during that developmental period. IVM in other species is also carried out as some animals are used as models to study human-related reproductive biology. This research is often carried out with the aim of improving success rates of in vitro systems and/or aim to improve fertility in vivo.

Animal IVM models can be used to study how different exposures to harmful and toxic substances affect the maturing oocytes and their ability to become fertilized and develop into an embryo.

It can also be used for subsequent biotechnology applications such as for the creation of transgenic animals using innovative gene-editing techniques such as CRISPR/Cas9, TALENs and ZFNs for biomedical research. An example includes genetically engineered pigs with CD163 and CD1D genes knocked out. One of the ways these pigs were created was by injecting the CRISPR/Cas9 system into fertilised oocytes that were matured in vitro.

In agriculture, IVM is usually carried out prior to IVF or artificial insemination as a means of conserving desirable traits of particular animals within herds and counteracting lower production as a result of seasonal breeding. In livestock species such cattle, transvaginal oocyte recovery from the ovaries of live female animals can be repeatedly carried out prior to the in vitro production of embryos.

In non-domesticated animals, IVM can also be used for the conservation of endangered species whilst maintaining genetic diversity. However, due to limited resources and the species-specific nature of assisted reproductive technologies, the application of techniques such as IVM is still rare for non-domesticated animals.

== Success rate and future uses ==
In an experiment by Segers I et al. (2015), the overall maturation rate after IVM of oocytes recovered from ovariectomy specimens in laboratory was 36%. The maturation rate correlated with the age of patient and duration of IVM. With the 8 couples with embryo cryopreservation, there was a 65% fertilisation rate. At least one good quality day 3 embryo was cryopreserved in 7/8 couples. This experiment shows that IVM of oocytes obtained ex vivo during the processing of ovarian cortex prior to cryopreservation is a promising solution for patients at risk for fertility loss.

The success of embryo production in vitro depends upon the use of an efficient oocyte retrieval technique and the best results have been obtained by laparoscopic aspiration.

== Limitations ==
The obstetric and perinatal outcomes of births from IVM cycles are similar to those with ICSI treatments. However, IVM involves the use of invasive techniques, this may harm the mother. Furthermore, embryological outcome of IVM is not established. A more comprehensive appraisal of health status of IVM children will demand larger prospective studies. The potential of cryopreserved IVM oocytes from cancer patients remain unknown. The optimal number of IVM oocytes frozen in candidates for fertility preservation (FP) is unknown. FP oocytes of infertile PMOS women have decreased competence compared to oocytes recovered after ovarian stimulation. The FP strategy of cryopreservation of oocytes after IVM should only be considered should ovarian stimulation is unfeasible.

In norma-ovulatory women, the success rate of IVM is lower than conventional ovarian stimulation regimens with poorer implantation and pregnancy rates. IVM is suboptimal and influenced by several factors. However, IVM is a milder approach to assisted reproduction treatment and an alternative procedure for specific conditions. Accurate patient selection can improve IVM clinical outcome.

== Improvements ==
IVM of oocytes cryopreserved may assist urgent fertility preservation in cancer patients. However, there is insufficient data regarding this outcome. Improving the culture conditions may increase the maturation rates and the potential of IVM oocytes.

Besides that, in mouse oocytes, I-Carnitine (LC) supplementation during vitrification of germinal vesicle (GV) and their subsequent IVM improved nuclear maturation as well as meiotic spindle assembly and mitochondrial distribution in MII oocytes. However, no data to date has proven this benefit in fetal development and birth of healthy offspring after embryo transfer to surrogate females. However, this protocol could potentially improve the quality of vitrified human oocytes and embryos during IVM. In a research by Wang X et al. (2014), gonadotropins affect oocyte maturation, fertilisation and developmental competence in vitro. The responsiveness of bovine oocytes to gonadotropins in vitro depends on the relative concentrations (FSH/LH) for optimal oocyte development developmental competence. Optimal FSH/LH concentrations could improve therapeutic clinical stimulation protocols and IVF success rates.
