= DIY transgender hormone therapy =

DIY transgender hormone therapy (DIY HRT) is the self-medication by transgender people of gender-affirming hormone therapy, as part of their medical transition. This may be caused by various problems accessing healthcare which transgender people face. DIY HRT can refer to either prescription HRT obtained without a prescription or homebrew HRT.

The prevalence of DIY hormone therapy in the trans community varies between studies, with low rates such as 11% in Ontario, Canada and high rates such as 79% in Rio de Janeiro, Brazil. Trans men are estimated to use DIY HRT at lower rates than trans women, possibly because masculinizing hormone therapy largely uses testosterone, a controlled substance in many territories.

== Description ==
DIY transgender hormone therapy involves transgender people "seek[ing] to access [transgender hormone therapy] through friends, peers, and the internet, without consulting a health worker." Trans people can obtain information about hormone therapy from online sources, some of which are generated by the trans community.

In rare cases, some transgender people have attempted DIY surgeries.

== Causes ==
A 2022 review article concluded that DIY hormone replacement therapy "is related to challenges finding knowledgeable and non-stigmatising health workers, lack of access to appropriate services, exclusion, discomfort managing relationships with health workers, cost and desire for a faster transition."

Nonbinary individuals frequently report the use of DIY hormone replacement therapy due to a distrust in the healthcare system which often prioritizes those undergoing a binary gender transition. This is compounded by the lack of training on nonbinary identities in standard medical practice.

== Prevalence ==
Estimates of the prevalence of DIY hormone therapy in the trans community vary significantly. One survey in Ontario found that 25% currently or formerly obtained DIY hormones, whereas for trans people of color living in San Francisco a different survey found that 63% had relied on DIY. According to a 2022 review, at the low end, 11% of Ontarian transgender people report having used DIY HRT; at the other extreme, 79% of trans women from Rio de Janeiro have done the same. In between lie London at 31% of transgender people, and 49% of trans women in San Francisco.

The use of DIY increased during the COVID-19 pandemic although it had been common before. The prevalence of DIY hormone usage has been estimated to be higher among trans women than trans men. A possible explanation is that testosterone is a controlled substance in many places, and is therefore harder to obtain and use without a prescription, legally.

In December 2022, China banned the online sale of estradiol and cyproterone acetate, key components of feminizing hormone therapy.

== Effectiveness ==
A 2022 review identified no peer-reviewed studies on the effectiveness of self-administered gender-affirming hormones. However, individual users frequently report satisfaction with the results of their self-administered hormones.

== Risks ==
DIY hormone replacement therapy carries increased risks due to the uncertainties of grey market medication sourcing and the lack of medical oversight. Suppliers regularly post lab test results to confirm purity and concentration. Androgens such as testosterone are considered controlled substances in many jurisdictions, those who possess or distribute them may be subjected to legal risks including criminal prosecution.

== Society and culture ==
=== In China ===
Research among Chinese transfeminine communities shows that DIY hormone therapy complicates commonly held ideas about risks and side effects in biomedicine. Hormone medication is colloquially referred to as "candy" (糖, táng) within the community, and trans women often refer to themselves as "[little] medicine girls" ([小]药娘, xiǎo yào niáng, xyn). DIY use also sometimes favors "feminine explosion" (雌爆, cíbào), high levels of estrogen achieved via injection, such as Progynon, which has not been determined by research to be more advantageous.

It has developed both as an anti-censorship strategy as well as a way to show the euphoric yet ordinary nature of taking hormones. This novel way of looking at hormonal sex development is sometimes called "exo-crinology".

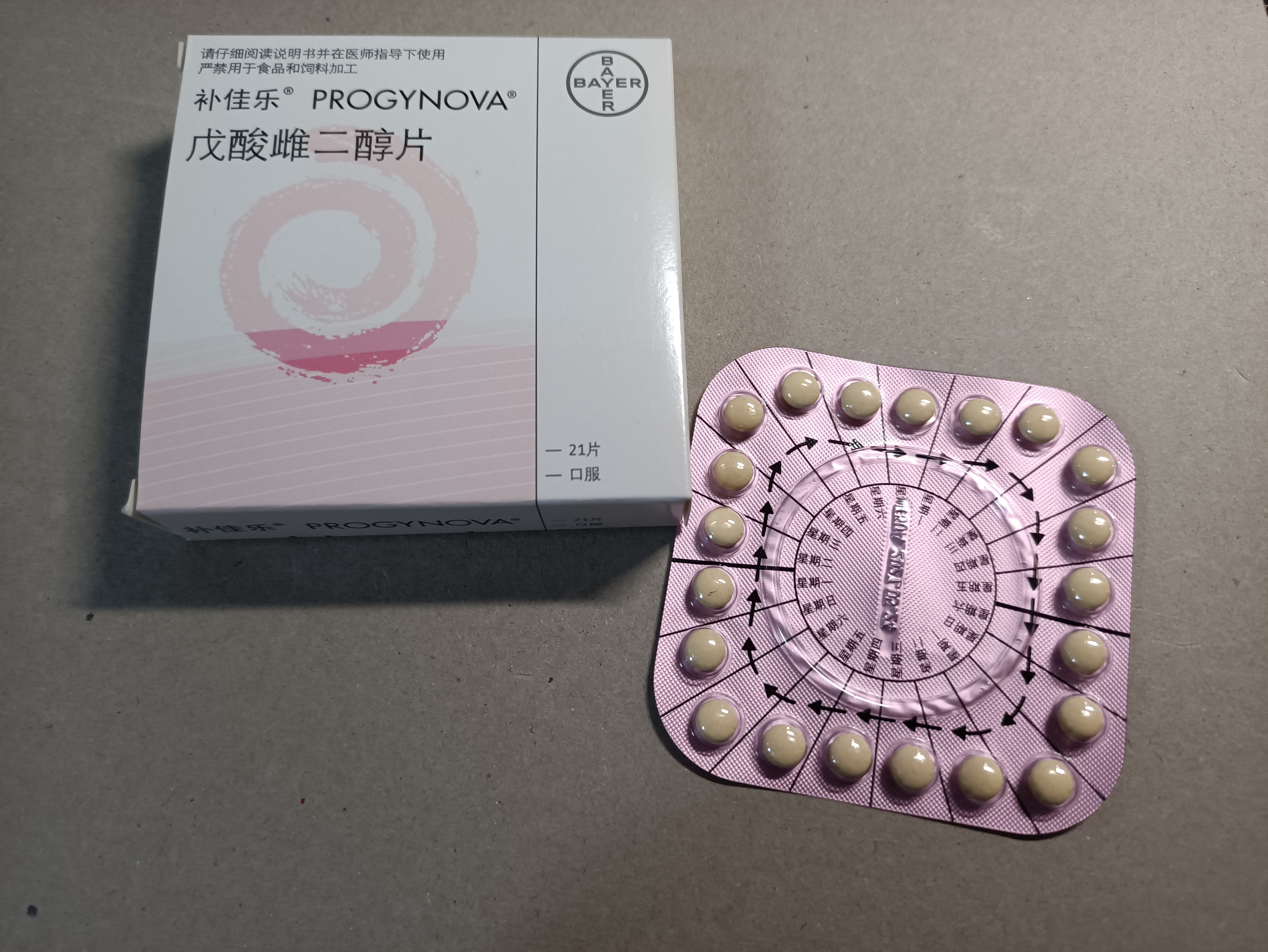
Estradiol valerate tablets in mainland China, featuring the pink spiral on the packaging box.

The pink spiral product logo, used by estrogen manufacturer Bayer, and by extension the similar logo of the Debian operating system, has become widely associated with the transgender community, used in everyday items like badges, pins, plush keychains, hair clips, and mouse pads.

== See also ==
- Transgender health care
- Transgender health care misinformation
- Puberty blocker
