= Oncofertility Consortium =

International research group

Oncofertility Consortium Logo

The Oncofertility Consortium is an international, multi-institutional group that assesses the impact of cancer and its treatment on reproductive health. Founded by Dr. Teresa Woodruff in 2007, its primary mission is to expand fertility options for cancer survivors. It has since expanded this mission to include non-oncologic conditions that affect fertility, including differences of sex development, gender-affirming treatment, and transfusion-dependent thalassemia.

The term oncofertility refers to an interdisciplinary field that bridges oncology, reproduction, and women’s health research for the purpose of exploring and expanding options for the reproductive future of cancer patients. Clinical care for such patients may include fertility preservation prior to medical interventions as well as family planning, complex contraception, and hormonal management across the cancer survivor's lifespan. The term was coined in 2006 by Dr. Woodruff, at the Feinberg School of Medicine (Northwestern University). Woodruff is the Thomas J. Watkins Professor of Obstetrics and Gynecology at Feinberg.

== History ==
Cancer research has blossomed significantly since the signing of the National Cancer Act in 1971. With greater support for clinical and basic science research in cancer detection, diagnosis, and treatment, which was conducted by the newly developed National Cancer Institute (NCI), cancer survival rates rose rapidly. Currently, 75% of pediatric cancer patients survive. Thus, support for the NCI and its affiliates has greatly improved the quality of life for a large number of cancer patients.

However, despite new hope for survival, many men, women, and children diagnosed with cancer experience impaired reproductive function as a result of the rigorous therapies they undergo as part of their cancer treatment and, thus, face unique challenges in planning their lives after cancer.

== Research ==
The development of Oncofertility has been expedited in response to the increasing number of cancer survivors facing infertility after cancer treatment. To support the initiative to understand the risk of cancer therapies to reproductive health and to develop fertility-preserving options for new patients, the National Institutes of Health (NIH) has just awarded a 21 million dollar grant devoted to Oncofertility research. It will fund the development of fertility-saving medical techniques, such as ovarian tissue cryopreservation, and will help launch the first comprehensive investigation into the social considerations of fertility after cancer today.

== Oncofertility Consortium ==
At the core of this new program is the Oncofertility Consortium, a multi-institutional project to assess the impact of cancer and its treatment on reproductive health. The Consortium brings together biomedical and social scientists, oncologists, pediatricians, engineers, educators, social workers, medical ethicists and more from Northwestern, the University of California-San Diego, University of Pennsylvania, University of Missouri and Oregon Health & Science University, as well as numerous satellite institutions. This team of specialists is engaged in a thorough examination of the scientific, medical, psychological, legal and ethical issues surrounding infertility and cancer, with the goal of providing better cancer care and fertility options in the future.

== Young Women in Cancer Research Oncofertility Academy ==
The Young Women in Cancer Research Oncofertility Academy is an education program for girls that teaches the various disciplines associated with oncofertility. It is in session for two days a week over a course of six weeks in the summer. The students are chosen through BEWiSE (Better Education for Women in Science and Engineering), a program of the San Diego Science Alliance (SDSA). Only twelve girls are selected, and they must be heading into either their sophomore or junior year in high school. The girls learn from various doctors and scientists during the Saturday Sessions, and discuss and read articles during the Wednesday sessions.

== Oncofertility Saturday Academy ==
Oncofertility Saturday Academy (OSA) is a science program designed to engage a diverse population of high school girls from Chicago and San Diego to explore the basic science, clinical applications, and career options in reproductive science, cancer biology, and oncofertility. OSA was initiated in 2007 by the Northwestern University and Young Women's Leadership Charter School (YWLCS) of Chicago Science Partnership. OSA consists of seven modules that navigate the high school girls to authentically experience the translational nature of science.
