= June Youatt =

American university professor and former administrator

June Youatt is an American university professor and former administrator, holding the posts of Professor in the Department of Human Development and Family Studies as well as Provost and Executive Vice President for Academic Affairs at Michigan State University (MSU).

== Career ==
Youatt started attending Michigan State University (MSU) in 1970 and went on to graduate school on the East Lansing campus of MSU.

In the early 1980s, Youatt worked as an assistant professor of home economics at MSU. Youatt served on a panel of experts consulted when designing a childhood center for Haslett in 1987. Her position at MSU was now in the family and child ecology department. During this time, she was involved in research and reviews of research on fatherhood. By the late 1990s, she was a full professor in the family and child ecology department at MSU. In the early 2000s, she became the assistant provost for undergraduate education at MSU and later became the dean of undergraduate studies.

Youatt was appointed the interim provost at MSU in 2013, taking over from Kim Wilcox. In 2014, Youatt was one of five finalists for the provost position at MSU. She was chosen that March to become the provost at MSU, holding the top academic post at the university.

Youatt resigned from her role as provost in 2019, after an Office for Civil Rights (OCR) report into sexual misconduct at MSU that criticized her handling of complaints against a former dean.
