= Semen cryopreservation =

Procedure to preserve sperm cells

Semen cryopreservation (commonly called sperm banking or sperm freezing) is a procedure to preserve sperm cells. Semen can be used successfully indefinitely after cryopreservation. It can be used for sperm donation where the recipient wants the treatment in a different time or place, or as a means of preserving fertility for men undergoing vasectomy or treatments that may compromise their fertility, such as chemotherapy, radiation therapy or surgery. It is also often used by trans women prior to medically transitioning in ways that affect fertility, such as feminizing hormone therapy and orchiectomies.

== Freezing ==
The most common cryoprotectant used for semen is glycerol (10% in culture medium). Often sucrose or other di-, trisaccharides are added to glycerol solution. Cryoprotectant media may be supplemented with either egg yolk or soy lecithin, with the two having no statistically significant differences compared to each other regarding motility, morphology, ability to bind to hyaluronate in vitro, or DNA integrity after thawing.

Additional cryoprotectants can be used to increase sperm viability and fertility rates post-freezing. Treatment of sperm with heparin binding proteins prior to cryopreservation showed decreased cryoinjury and generation of ROS. The addition of nerve growth factor as a cryoprotectant decreases sperm cell death rates and increased motility after thawing. Incorporation of cholesterol into sperm cell membranes with the use of cyclodextrins prior to freezing also increases sperm viability.

== Packaging Method ==
The packaging method is a crucial aspect of cryopreservation processes, as it directly affects thermal stability, storage capacity, and the efficiency of sample thawing. Several packaging techniques are used for sperm cryopreservation, each with its advantages and disadvantages:

Cryo-tops (Cryovials or Cryotubes)

Advantages:

- Provide a good surface for sample identification.
- Offer greater thermal stability during the process.

Disadvantages:

- Nitrogen may come into contact with the stored material.
- Require more storage space.
- Exhibit a less uniform freezing rate.

Goblets

Advantages:

- Low cost.
- Allow partial thawing of samples.
- Ensure uniform freezing.

Disadvantages:

- Nitrogen comes into contact with the sample.
- Pills stored in these devices are more sensitive to temperature changes.

Straws

Advantages:

- Require less storage space.
- Enable a more uniform freezing rate.
- Allow rapid thawing.

Disadvantages:

- More sensitive to temperature changes.
- Offer a smaller surface for identification.
- The cost of filling and sealing equipment is high.

== Thawing ==
Thawing at 40 °C (104 °F) seems to result in optimal sperm motility. On the other hand, the exact thawing temperature seems to have only minor effect on sperm viability, acrosomal status, ATP content, and DNA. As with freezing, various techniques have been developed for the thawing process, both discussed by Di Santo et al.

== Refreezing ==
In terms of the level of sperm DNA fragmentation, up to three cycles of freezing and thawing can be performed without causing a level of risk significantly higher than following a single cycle of freezing and thawing. This is provided that samples are refrozen in their original cryoprotectant and are not going through sperm washing or other alteration in between, and provided that they are separated by density gradient centrifugation or swim-up before use in assisted reproduction technology.

== Effect on quality ==
Some evidence suggests an increase in single-strand breaks, condensation and fragmentation of DNA in sperm after cryopreservation. This can potentially increase the risk of mutations in offspring DNA. Antioxidants and the use of well-controlled cooling regimes could potentially improve outcomes.

In long-term follow-up studies, no evidence has been found either of an increase in birth defects or chromosomal abnormalities in people conceived from cryopreserved sperm compared with the general population.

== See also ==
- Cryopreservation of animal genetic resources § Semen
- Frozen bovine semen
- Oocyte cryopreservation
