= Ovarian tissue cryopreservation =

Ovarian tissue cryopreservation is cryopreservation of tissue of the ovary of a female.

== Indications ==
Cryopreservation of ovarian tissue is of interest to women who want fertility preservation beyond the natural limit, or whose reproductive potential is threatened by cancer therapy, for example in hematologic malignancies or breast cancer. It can be performed on prepubertal girls at risk for premature ovarian failure, and this procedure is as feasible and safe as comparable operative procedures in children.

== Procedure ==
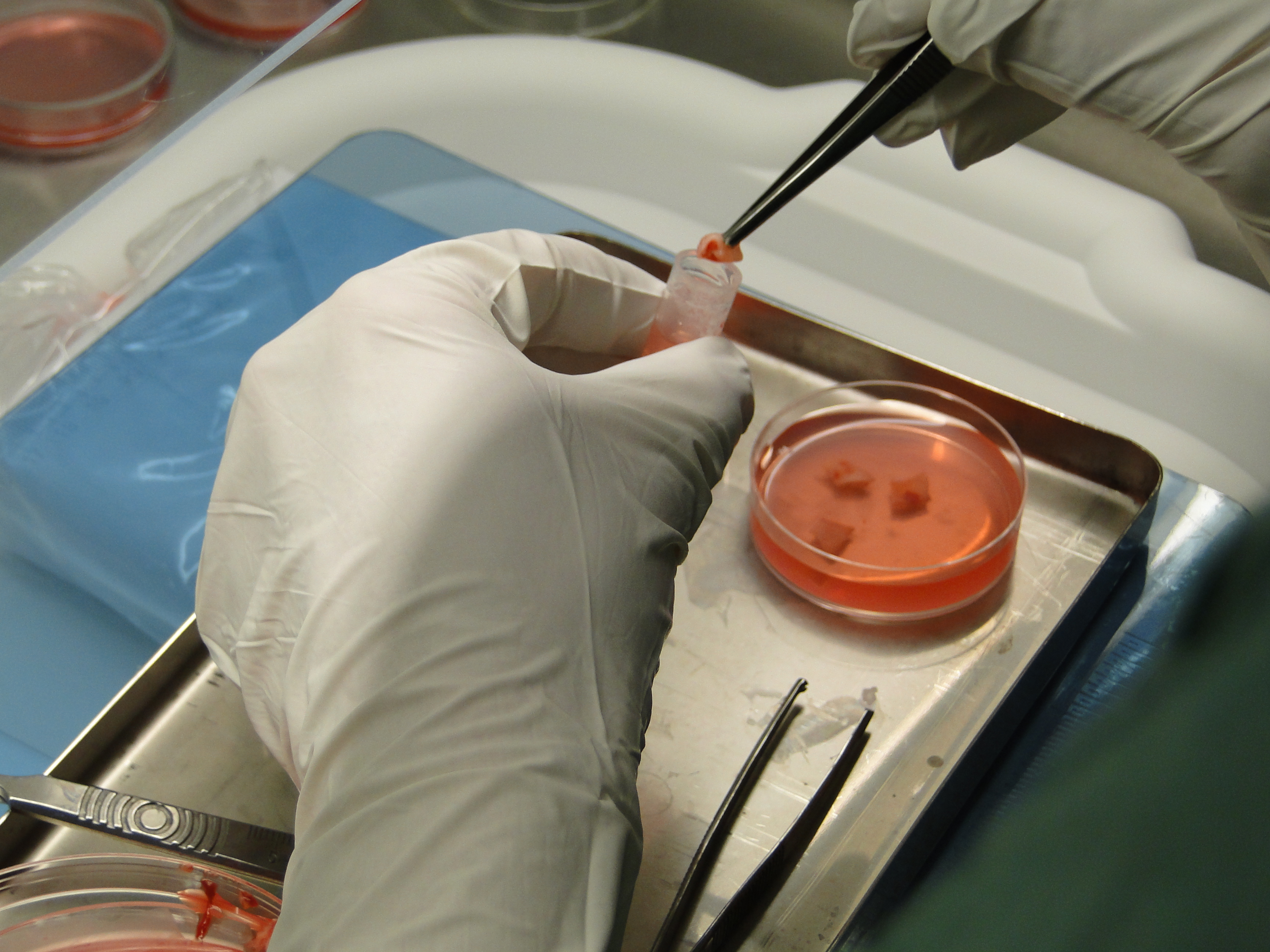
Placing ovarian tissue strips into the preserving solution

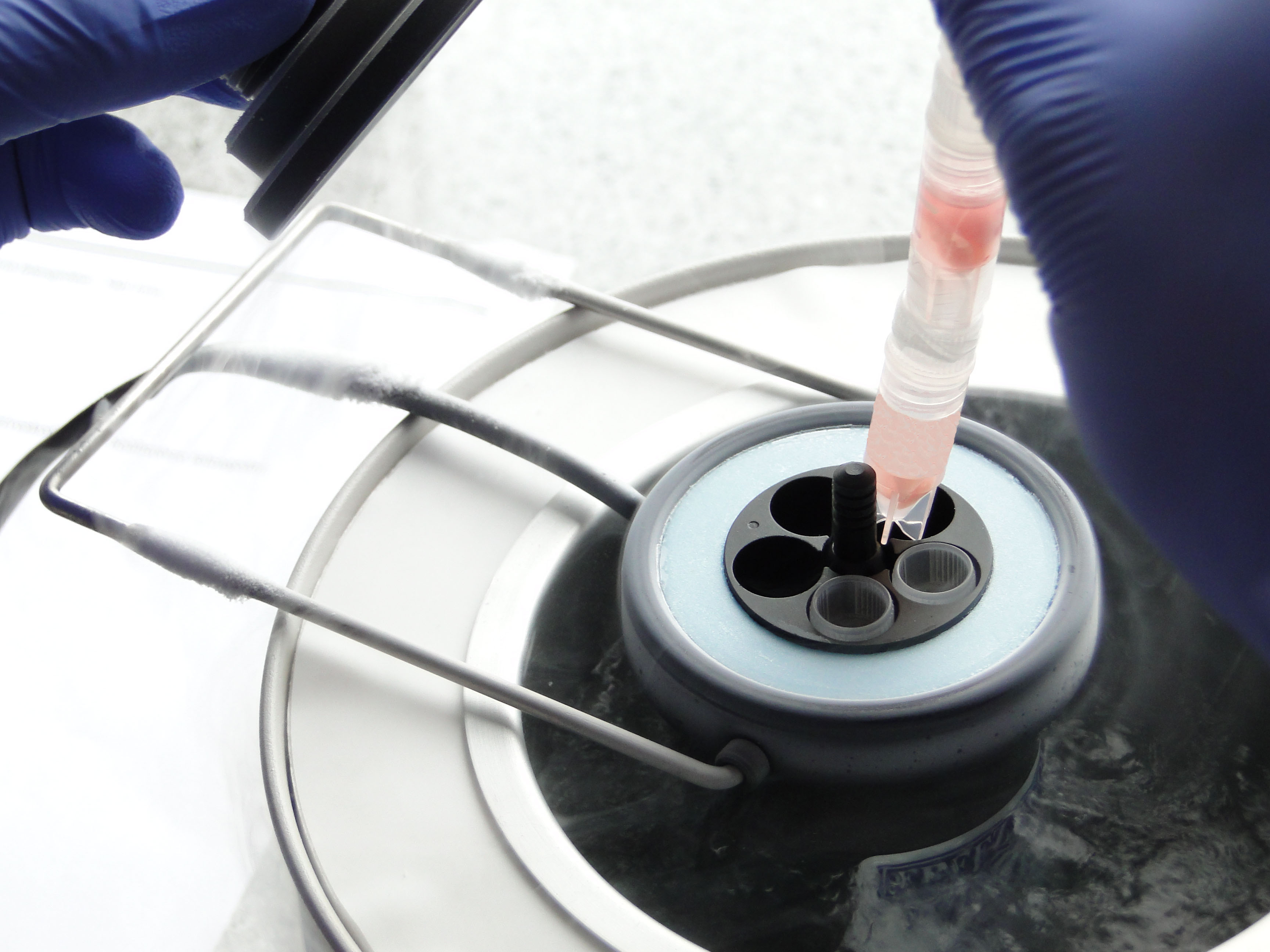
Cryopreserving ovarian tissue strips

The procedure is to take a part of the ovary and carry out slow freezing before storing it in liquid nitrogen whilst therapy is undertaken. Tissue can then be thawed and implanted near the fallopian, either orthotopic (on the natural location) or heterotopic (on the abdominal wall), where it starts to produce new eggs, allowing normal conception to take place. A study of 60 procedures concluded that ovarian tissue harvesting appears to be safe. A study has also concluded that culturing a thawed fetal ovarian tissue for a few days before transplanting can be beneficial to the development of follicles.

Strips of cortical ovarian tissue can also be cryopreserved, but it must be re-implanted into the body to allow the encapsulated immature follicles to complete their maturation. In vitro maturation has been performed experimentally, but the technique is not yet clinically available. With this technique, cryopreserved ovarian tissue could possibly be used to make oocytes that can directly undergo in vitro fertilization.

== Potential for Pregnancy ==
Women with malignant diseases that undergo treatment utilizing irradiation or gonadotoxic drugs, have an increase probability of losing ovarian function resulting in infertility. The ovarian cortical tissue harbors majority of the ovarian pool of follicles. Once a patient is cured from their malignant disease, the tissue can be thawed and then transplanted for the possibility of restoring ovarian function. Following auto-transplantation, patients showed resumption of ovarian activity to include the first menstruation at 14 to 25 weeks, and follicular development 8 to 21 weeks.

== Risk of cancer recurrence ==
For autotransplantation of cryopreserved ovarian tissue in cancer survivors, metastases have been repeatedly detected in ovarian tissue obtained from patients with leukemia, as well as in one patient with Ewing sarcoma. Ovarian tissue autotransplantation may pose a risk of cancer recurrence in patients with colorectal, gastric and endometrial cancer. However, no metastases have been detected in ovarian tissue from lymphoma and breast cancer patients who have been undergoing ovarian tissue cryopreseration.

== History ==
The first transplant of cryopreserved ovarian tissue was performed in New York by Kutluk Oktay in 1999, but it did not restore menstrual cycles to the patient. In 2004 Jacques Donnez in Belgium reported the first successful birth from frozen tissue using a protocol developed in Roger Gosden’s laboratory, where Oktay had studied.

In 1997 samples of ovarian cortex were taken from a woman with Hodgkin's lymphoma and cryopreserved by slow freezing (Planer, UK) for banking in liquid nitrogen. The patient had premature ovarian failure after chemotherapy. In 2003, after freeze-thawing, orthotopic autotransplantation of ovarian cortical tissue was done by laparoscopy and five months after reimplantation regular ovulatory cycles were reinitiated. Eleven months after re-implantation a viable intrauterine pregnancy was confirmed, which resulted in the delivery of a healthy baby. Donnez's claims have been challenged because there was no absolute proof if the mother was infertile before treatment. However, Sherman Silber in St. Louis, Missouri, and another of Gosden's collaborators, Dror Meirow at the Sheba Medical Center in Israel, and subsequently others have proven beyond doubt the technique is effective. Healthy babies of both genders have been born.

The first birth following transplantation of ovarian tissue stored at a central cryo bank and transported overnight has been achieved by centers of the Fertiprotekt network in Germany 2011. This demonstrated that ovarian tissue can be stored centrally in specialized centers.

== See also ==
- Tissue cryopreservation
- Cryopreservation of testicular tissue
