= Fertility preservation =

Procedure to retain reproductive ability

Fertility preservation is the effort to help cancer patients retain their fertility, or ability to procreate. Research into how cancer, ageing and other health conditions effect reproductive health and preservation options are growing, specifically sparked in part by the increase in the survival rate of cancer patients.

== Indications ==
Fertility preservation procedures are indicated when it is predicted that there will be exposure to a cause of infertility, mainly cancer treatment but also ageing, Gender-affirming hormone therapy (GAHT) for transgender individuals and conditions like Polyendocrine metabolic ovarian syndrome (PMOS) or Primary ovarian insufficiency (POI).

=== Chemotherapy and radiotherapy ===
Chemotherapy and radiation treatments for cancer and autoimmune conditions like Lupus and Multiple Sclerosis have the ability to affect reproductive health. The regimens that threaten ovarian and testicular function are mainly radiation therapy to the pelvic area and some types of chemotherapy. Chemotherapies with high risk include procarbazine and alkylating drugs such as cyclophosphamide, ifosfamide, busulfan, melphalan, chlorambucil and chlormethine. Drugs with medium risk include doxorubicin and platinum analogs such as cisplatin and carboplatin. On the other hand, therapies with low risk of gonadotoxicity include plant derivatives such as vincristine and vinblastine, antibiotics such as bleomycin and dactinomycin and antimetabolites such as methotrexate, mercaptopurine and 5-fluoruracil.

These regimens attack rapidly dividing cells in the body, including healthy cells like sperm and those belonging to the ovarian follicle (egg). Depending on the dose and duration of administration, these therapies can have varying effects on reproductive health. Surgery involving reproductive tissue affects reproductive function and fertility.

For some patients receiving chemotherapy or radiotherapy, the decrease or loss of reproductive function is temporary; many male and female patients, however, do not regain fertility after this treatment. The extent of the damage to ovaries resulting in diminished fertility can be associated with the chemotherapeutic regiment such as the combination of chemotherapy and radiotherapy (chemoradiation) where despite allowing a more effective treatment or reducing the risk of the cancer returning (adjuvant chemotherapy). It has extensive associations with fertility damage than receiving either treatment individually. Sometimes these patients experience symptoms resembling menopause (in females) or andropause (in men), which can indicate reproductive damage. In females this can be premature menopause of menopause in premenopausal women; this state can be permanent or reversible, dependent on many factors.

A study indicated that fewer oocytes are recovered from cancer patients wanting to perform embryo preservation when compared with an age-matched control group, but the mean number of zygotes generated appears to be similar. The same study found that, of 65 patients referred to the program, 28% declined to undergo embryo, oocyte, or tissue cryopreservation. 9% were found not to be eligible for medical reasons. Of the remaining 41 patients, 85% chose to cryopreserve embryos, 10% chose to cryopreserve oocytes, and 5% chose to undergo ovarian tissue freezing. No serious clinical sequelae resulted from participation.

Prior to females undergoing these treatments, a testing for the level of anti-Müllerian hormone (AMH) is useful in predicting the long-term post-chemotherapy loss of ovarian function, in turn predicting the need for fertility preservation strategies in the future.

=== Ageing ===
Increasing age in females is directly associated with decreasing reproductive potential. This can be the result of many factors such as the amount of eggs available and their overall reproductive quality. Fertility preservation, such as ovarian tissue or oocyte cryopreservation, may also be used to prevent infertility, as well as birth defects, associated with advanced maternal age.

Males also have decreasing fertility as they age, however this is associated with a problem in sperm quality as opposed to the overall sperm count. These changes can be attributed to the reduction in testosterone males experience when ageing.

=== Polyendocrine metabolic ovarian syndrome ===
Polyendocrine metabolic ovarian syndrome (PMOS or previously called PCOS) is the most prevalent endocrine disorder females experience during prime reproductive age.

PMOS has a direct relationship with many health risks such as the development of Type 2 Diabetes, increasing insulin levels, obesity and increased waist size. Females with PMOS usually experience anovulation (where they will not regularly release an egg). The link between infertility and PMOS is well documented and so females may therefore seek fertility treatment like ovulation induction.

=== Primary ovarian insufficiency ===
Primary ovarian insufficiency (POI) is defined as when ovarian function is stopped prematurely (before the age of 40). This is also known premature ovarian failure or premature menopause. Ovarian deficiency causes a reduction in serum estrogen levels which can lead to infertility, giving a reason for females to seek fertility treatment.

POI can result in a long term risk of serious physical symptoms including bone fragility and heart problems. It has also been linked to psychological distress specifically in regards to fertility loss and the long term consequences of that.

== Methods ==
The main methods of fertility preservation are ovarian protection by GnRH agonists, cryopreservation of ovarian tissue, eggs or sperm, or of embryos after in vitro fertilization. The patient may also choose to use egg or sperm from a donor by third party reproduction rather than having biological children.

=== Semen cryopreservation ===
Men hoping to preserve their fertility before undergoing treatment for cancer or another fertility-threatening disease can cryopreserve, or freeze, their sperm, which can be obtained through masturbation in post-pubescent boys and men. This is the most established fertility preservation method for males. For pre-pubescent boys, sperm can be obtained through testicular aspiration or electrostimulation and then stored for future use. Researchers are also looking at methods for cryopreserving testicular tissue samples so that they can be re-implanted into the body after treatment.

=== Cryopreservation of ovarian tissue or oocytes ===
==== Oocyte cryopreservation ====
Oocyte cryopreservation involves the extraction and freezing of a female's eggs, to preserve their viability for future use. This is often for medical reasons such as females undergoing cancer treatment. It is also increasingly being used for elective fertility preservation in females who are not ready to become pregnant but who are conscious of their age-related decline in fertility. This process is different to embryo cryopreservation, where mature eggs are fertilised in vitro (outside the body) with sperm from a donor or partner, and the embryo is frozen. The religious and ethical concerns and legislative restrictions surrounding embryo cryopreservation has prompted significant technical advances in oocyte cryopreservation techniques. Oocyte cryopreservation is now considered a well-established technique for fertility preservation in women.

==== Embryo cryopreservation ====
Some female patients choose to have mature eggs extracted and fertilized outside of the body with sperm from a partner or donor. The resulting embryo is then frozen until the female's is in remission from disease. When the female's is ready to initiate pregnancy, the embryo is thawed and implanted into the uterus for maturation and birth. While this option is the most common fertility preservation method in females, it is not available to pre-pubescent girls, who do not have mature eggs that can be fertilized. females who do not have a partner will need to use donor sperm. Additionally, because this procedure requires a two-week period of hormonal stimulation to encourage egg maturation, it is not optimal for female patients who are diagnosed with hormone-sensitive cancers (such as breast cancer, ovarian cancer, etc.) or those who cannot delay cancer treatment. Alternative methods of hormonal stimulation using letrozole or tamoxifen may be used for females with hormone-sensitive cancers.

==== Ovarian tissue cryopreservation ====
Cryopreservation of human ovarian tissue has been successfully carried out around the world to preserve fertility in female cancer patients and in other pathologies where the patient is at increased risk of primary ovarian insufficiency. Most notably, this technique can provide an option for fertility preservation in prepubertal girls. Part of the ovary is removed, frozen and stored until after treatment. The tissue is then thawed and re-implanted. According to a meta-analysis performed in 2017, the success rate of reestablishment of ovarian activity was 63.9%, restoring normal fertility and endocrine function. Over 130 live births have been reported as of June 2017.

Strips of cortical ovarian tissue can also be cryopreserved, but it must be re-implanted into the body to allow the encapsulated immature follicles to complete their maturation. Furthermore, ovarian tissue is fragile under hard freezing conditions and putting it back into the body carries the risk of re-introducing cancerous cells. In vitro maturation has been achieved experimentally, but the technique is not yet clinically available. With this technique, cryopreserved ovarian tissue could possibly be used to make oocytes that can directly undergo in vitro fertilization.

=== Third-party reproduction ===
Many patients diagnosed with a malignancy or another disease requiring treatment that may impair their fertility consider alternatives to bearing biological children, such as assisted reproductive technology (ART) using in vitro fertilization (IVF) with donor eggs or donor sperm. The resulting embryo can be implanted into the female's's uterus after her endometrium (the lining of the uterus) is stimulated with hormones to prepare for the development of the embryo.

=== Others ===
Females requiring local pelvic radiation therapy may benefit from surgical transposition of the ovaries to a site remote from maximal radiation exposure.

The use of GnRH agonists for ovarian protection during chemotherapy is suggested to benefit the ability to ovulate, but benefits in terms of e.g. pregnancy rate are lacking.

Table 1: Main Options of Fertility Preservation

Method	Process	Advantages and Disadvantages	Further Considerations
Oocyte cryopreservation	Halt GAHT (gender affirming hormone therapy) and carry out ovarian stimulation with transvaginal oocyte retrieval.; Cryopreserve mature oocytes.	No sperm necessary at time of retrieval, can be used later for fertilisation.; Clinically available.; Has to be carried out after puberty.; Invasive procedure.	Those with female partners, donor sperm may be required, the embryo can then be transferred to the partners uterus.; Individuals with male partners can use partner's sperm but will need a surrogate to carry the embryo.
Embryo cryopreservation	Halt GAHT and carry out ovarian stimulation to harvest oocytes.; Fertilisation of mature oocytes and embryo cryopreservation.	Clinically available.; Need sperm at time of oocyte retrieval.; Has to be carried out after puberty.; Invasive procedure.	Those with female partners donor sperm may be required, the embryo can then be transferred to the partners uterus.; Individuals with male partners can use partner's sperm but will need a surrogate to carry the embryo.
Ovarian tissue cryopreservation	Can be carried out at the same time as sex reassignment surgery.; Surgical extraction of ovarian tissue for cryopreservation.	Can be carried out before and after puberty.; No sperm necessary at time of retrieval.; Clinically available.; Don't need to halt GAHT.	Cryopreservation of either an ovarian cortex biopsy or the whole ovary, then the thawing and maturation of the follicles at a later date.; Reimplantation of the tissue and the use of IVF.

== Adverse effects ==
Compared with the general population, people with cancer have a higher risk of arterial thrombotic events such as stroke, myocardial infarction and peripheral arterial embolism. This risk has a potential to be further increased in females undergoing controlled ovarian hyperstimulation for fertility preservation, but is usually only associated with cases of ovarian hyperstimulation syndrome (OHSS). On the other hand, venous thromboembolism rarely occurs unless a pregnancy is achieved, and is therefore usually not particularly relevant in the stage of oocyte retrieval. Therefore, the recommended controlled ovarian hyperstimulation protocol for in females with cancer is an antagonist protocol using a GnRH agonist for final maturation induction, in order to decrease the risk of OHSS. When used in conjunction with oocyte or embryo cryopreservation, using GnRH agonist rather than hCG for final maturation induction has no evidence of a difference in live birth rate (in contrast to fresh cycles where usage of GnRH agonist has a lower live birth rate). Anticoagulant prophylaxis is recommended to be administered only to selected subgroups of females such as those with other risk factors of hypercoagulability or those who do develop early OHSS.

== Fertility preservation in transgender men ==
It is necessary that transgender men be given the opportunity to have counselling on preserving their fertility before undergoing any type of medical transition, as certain methods may cause them to be unable to carry children. Some fertility options in adult trans men present problems as they may require stopping hormone treatment for around 3 months and/or transvaginal ultrasounds, both of which may be distressing for a transgender individual. Various methods of fertility preservation are detailed in the table above.
