= Apoplexy =

Rupture of an internal organ

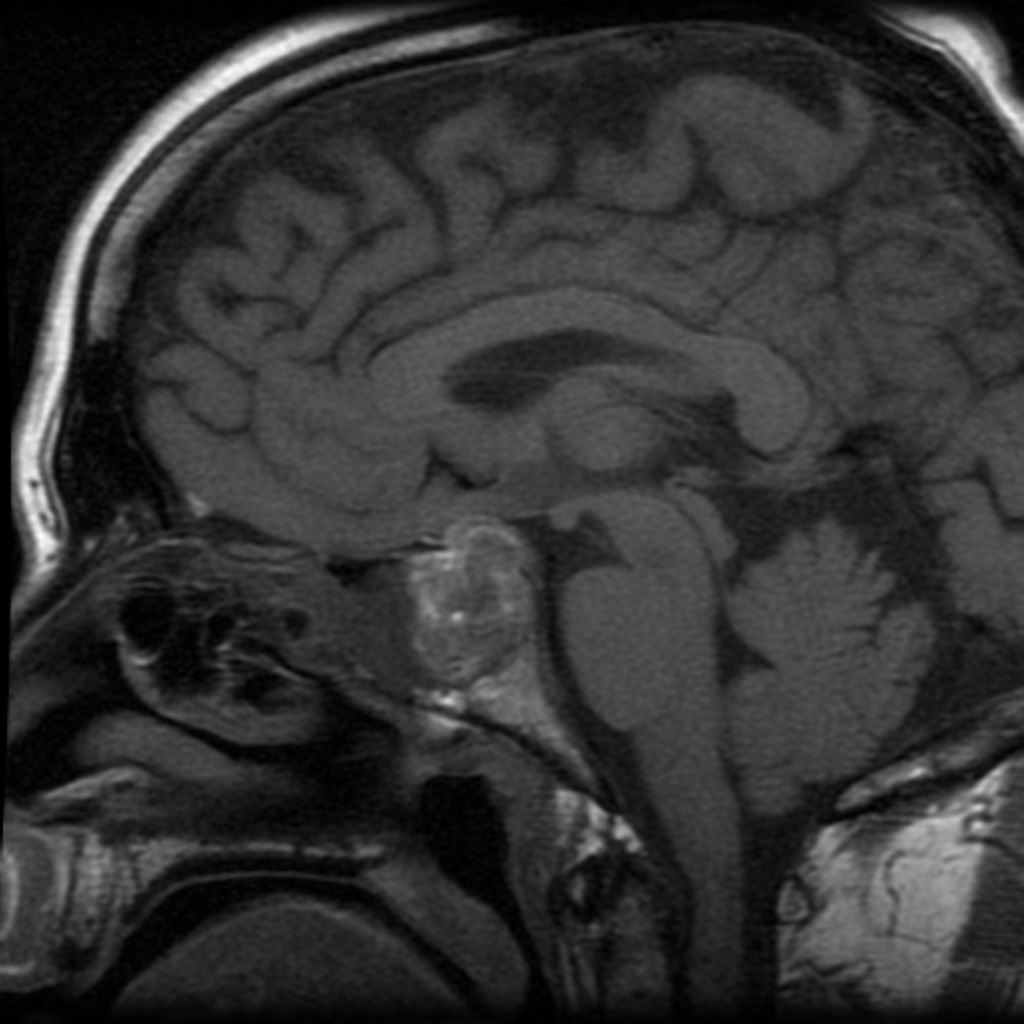
MRI of man with pituitary apoplexy

Apoplexy (Ancient Greek: ἀποπληξία, romanized: apoplexia, lit. 'a striking away') refers to the rupture of an internal organ and the associated symptoms. Informally or metaphorically, the term apoplexy is associated with being furious, especially as "apoplectic". Historically, it described what is now known as a hemorrhagic stroke, typically involving a ruptured blood vessel in the brain; modern medicine typically specifies the anatomical location of the bleeding, such as cerebral apoplexy, ovarian apoplexy, or pituitary apoplexy.

== Historical meaning ==
From the late 14th to the late 19th century, the diagnosis apoplexy referred to any sudden death that began with abrupt loss of consciousness, especially when the victim died within seconds after losing consciousness. The word apoplexy was sometimes used to refer to the symptom of sudden loss of consciousness immediately preceding death. Strokes, ruptured aortic aneurysms, and even heart attacks were referred to as apoplexy in the past, because before the advent of biomedical science, the ability to differentiate abnormal conditions and diseased states was limited. Physiology, as a medical field, dates back at least to the time of Hippocrates, but before the late 19th century, physicians often had inadequate or inaccurate understandings of many of the human body's normal functions and abnormal presentations. Hence, identifying a specific cause of a symptom or of death often proved difficult or impossible.

== Hemorrhage ==
To specify the site of bleeding, the term "apoplexy" is often accompanied by a descriptive adjective. For instance, bleeding within the pituitary gland is termed "pituitary apoplexy", and bleeding within the adrenal glands is referred to as "adrenal apoplexy".

Apoplexy also includes hemorrhaging within the gland and accompanying neurological problems, such as confusion, headache, and impairment of consciousness.

== See also ==
- Abdominal apoplexy
- Transient ischemic attack
