= Ovary =

Female reproductive organ that produces egg cells

- Ovaries located in the female reproductive system

Details
- System: Reproductive system
- Artery: Ovarian artery, uterine artery
- Vein: Ovarian vein
- Nerve: Ovarian plexus
- Lymph: Paraaortic lymph node

Identifiers
- Latin: ovarium
- MeSH: D010053
- TA98: A09.1.01.001
- TA2: 3470
- FMA: 7209

The ovary (from Latin ōvārium 'egg') is the paired primary sex organ, or gonad in the female reproductive system. The ovaries are responsible for the production of oogonia, their development to oocytes (immature egg cells), and the release as a mature egg cell (ovum) at ovulation. The egg cells, or ova are also known as gametes, and the process of their development is gametogenesis, known as oogenesis in the female. During their development each oocyte is surrounded by granulosa cells, forming an ovarian follicle. The ovary progresses through many stages beginning in the prenatal period through menopause.

The ovary also produces hormones, specifically sex hormones (sex steroids) to assist in the development of the egg cells. This hormone production in the granulosa cells of the ovarian follicles, makes the ovary an endocrine gland as well as a sex organ. The hormones are estrogen, and progesterone that also play an important part in the development and function of the female reproductive organs, and in the development at puberty of secondary sex characteristics.

The paired ovaries are located one on either side of the uterus, and connect with the uterus through the fallopian tubes. They are held in place by the ovarian ligament, and the suspensory ligament of the ovary.

Many of the structural and functional features of the human ovary are shared with other mammals and vertebrates and ovaries of some kind are found in many invertebrates. This article is primarily about the human ovary.

== Structure ==
The ovaries lie within the peritoneal cavity on either side of the uterus to which they are attached via a fibrous cord called the ovarian ligament. They are tethered to the body wall via the suspensory ligament of the ovary, which is a posterior extension of the broad ligament of the uterus. The part of the broad ligament of the uterus that suspends the ovary is known as the mesovarium. At puberty each ovary measures around 3 cm in length by 1.5 cm wide and is 1 cm thick, and sits in a depression in the lateral wall of the pelvic cavity called the ovarian fossa. that measures around 4 cm x 3 cm x 2 cm. The fossa is bounded above by the external iliac artery and vein, in front by the obliterated umbilical artery, and behind by the ureter.

The ovary has an inner core, the ovarian medulla, and an outer region, the ovarian cortex. The medulla is the highly vascular supportive stromal tissue concentrated in the center of the ovary. Its contents include blood vessels, lymphatic vessels, immune cells, and nerves. The cortex is an ill-defined outer region containing many ovarian follicles as the functional parenchyma. The follicles are surrounded by peripheral stroma. It can be hard to distinguish between the cortex and medulla, but follicles are usually not found in the medulla.

Each ovary is enclosed by a capsule of dense fibrous tissue, the tunica albuginea (ovarian capsule). A layer of cuboidal epithelium from the visceral peritoneum covers the ovarian capsule as ovarian surface epithelium.

The ovarian hilum is the hilum in the ovary, formed by the stroma and attached to the ovarian ligament where the blood vessels, lymphatic vessels and nerves enter the medulla of the ovary. It is also the main site of ovarian hilus cells also known as ovarian ovarian Leydig cells.

=== Rete ovarii ===
Histology of rete ovarii, in the hilum

The rete ovarii is an epithelial appendage of the ovary to which it is attached. It has been proposed to be presented as an ovarian organ. Before advanced imaging techniques were available the rete ovarii was overlooked as an insignificant embryonic remnant. It has been shown to be a structure of three distinct regions. Columnar epithelial cells create a tubular region ending in blind tips termed the extraovarian rete (EOR). Pseudocolumnar epithelial cells make up a connecting rete (CR). And squamous epithelial cells branch into an intricate network of thin cords of cells with a diameter of around 1-3 cells, known as the intraovarian rete (IOR). The CR connects the EOR to the IOR. In the region of the hilum the intraovarian rete forms part of the ovarian stroma.

The rete ovarii as a whole is surrounded by smooth muscle actin, a vascular network and various types of macrophage. Experiments suggest that the rete ovarii is secretory, sending material to the ovary. The size of the regions change with the EOR becoming the largest, and the IOR regressing to the medulla. The distinct regions presented suggest a different function for each. Cells of the rete ovarii may be ciliated or non-ciliated, with dense apical microvilli, and mitochondria. Glycogen, and mucins are also indicated in the extraovarian and connecting regions. Cells of the rete ovarii have been identified in the fetal gonads.

== Function ==
The two functions of the ovary are the development of the egg cell in a follicle until its release at its maturity, and the production of hormones. This parenchymal function is supported by the ovarian stroma.

=== Follicles ===
Diagram of ovary showing stages of follicle development, and accompanying development of the oocyte to the mature egg cell

Micrograph of ovarian cortex showing primary follicles H&E stain

During prenatal development in the process of oogenesis – the development of the egg cell, follicles form consisting of primary oocytes surrounded by a layer of follicular cells. The earliest follicles are the primordial follicles that consist of a single layer of pre-granulosa cells known as follicular cells surrounding a primary oocyte.

The numbers of primordial follicles and primary oocytes, peak at around 7 million by week 20 gestational age. Between then and birth, around 6 million will have been lost leaving just one million remaining at birth. There is further loss until at puberty the number is around 300,000 to 400,000.

The follicles are surrounded by peripheral stromal tissue. A large number of primordial follicles are present at birth of which many will be lost perinatally. Follicles develop to maturity in a process of folliculogenesis that supports the development of the oocyte to the mature egg cell.

At puberty, in the menstrual cycle the primordial follicles become triggered to change to primary follicles, and the follicular cells change to granulosa cells. In the transition from primary follicle to secondary follicle, layers of granulosa cells, and an external covering known as the theca forms. In later stages of the transition the theca organises into an internal and an external layer.

In the later stages of folliculogenesis the follicles include granulosa cells of the cumulus oophorus, and its inner layer of corona radiata, the zona pellucida, and the internal and external cell layers of the theca, and follicular fluid. At ovulation the oocyte and surrounding zona pellucida, and corona radiata are released into the peritoneal cavity when the follicle ruptures.

Rupture can take place when the ovarian outer tissues at the point of contact with the follicle erode. This eroded point of exit for the ruptured follicle contents is known as the ovarian stigma. The released egg cell and corona radiata are swept into the fallopian tube by its fimbriae, and if not fertilized after 28–48 hours they degenerate. The remains of the ruptured follicle form the corpus luteum.

=== Hormones ===
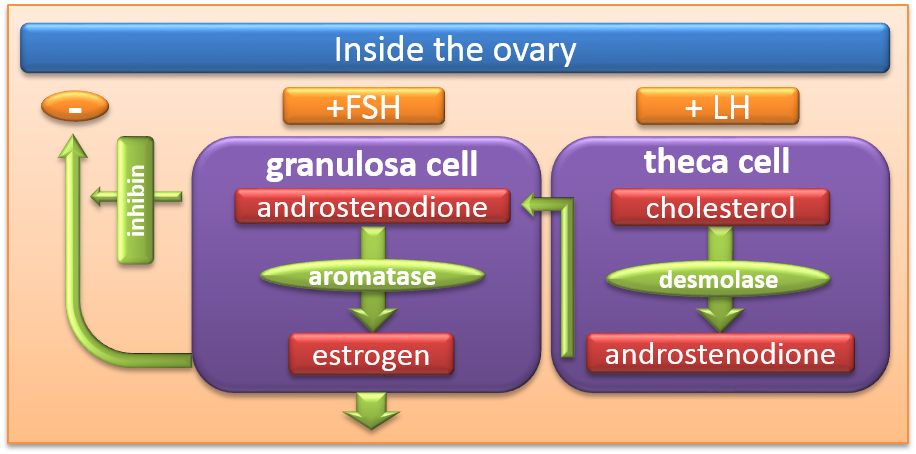
Diagram of hormonal reactions in ovary

The ovary produces hormones to assist in folliculogenesis and oogenesis. At puberty, the ovary begins to secrete increasing levels of hormones. The production of ovarian hormones is controlled bu the hypothalamic-pituitary-ovarian axis. Secondary sex characteristics begin to develop in response to the hormones. The ovary changes structure and function beginning at puberty. Since the ovaries can regulate hormones, they also play an important role in pregnancy and fertility. Usually, ovulation occurs in one of the two ovaries, releasing an egg cell each menstrual cycle. When an egg cell (secondary oocyte) is released and swept into the fallopian tube, feedback mechanisms stimulate the endocrine system, which causes hormone levels to change. These feedback mechanisms are controlled by the hypothalamus and pituitary glands. Messages or signals from the hypothalamus are sent to the pituitary gland. In turn, the pituitary gland releases hormones to the ovaries. From this signaling, the ovaries release their own hormones.

On maturing, a surge of luteinizing hormone is secreted by the pituitary gland, which stimulates the release of the oocyte through the rupture of the follicle, a process called ovulation. The remaining granulosa cells and theca cells from the ruptured follicle reorganize into the corpus luteum, which secretes progesterone to prepare the uterus for an eventual implantation of the embryo.

At maturity, ovaries secrete estrogen, androgen, inhibin, and progestogen. In women before menopause, 50% of testosterone is produced by the ovaries and released directly into the blood stream. The other 50% of testosterone in the bloodstream is made from the conversion of the adrenal pre-androgens (DHEA and androstenedione) to testosterone in other parts of the body. Estrogen is responsible for the appearance of secondary sex characteristics for females at puberty and for the maturation and maintenance of the reproductive organs in their mature functional state. Progesterone prepares the uterus for pregnancy and the mammary glands for lactation. Progesterone functions with estrogen by promoting menstrual cycle changes in the endometrium.

=== Stroma ===
Ovarian stromal tissue is concentrated in the central medulla of the ovary, and more loosely surrounding the follicles in the cortex as peripheral stroma. The stroma supports all stages of folliculogenesis, including the rupture of the follicle and subsequent formation of the corpus luteum.

The stromal components include blood vessels, lymphatic vessels, nerves, immune cells, and other cells. Some of the cells are specific to the ovary such as the hilar cells. Ovary-specific components as compartments include the ovarian surface epithelium, the tunica albuginea, interstitial stroma, the theca interna, and the intraovarian rete ovarii.

==== Blood supply ====
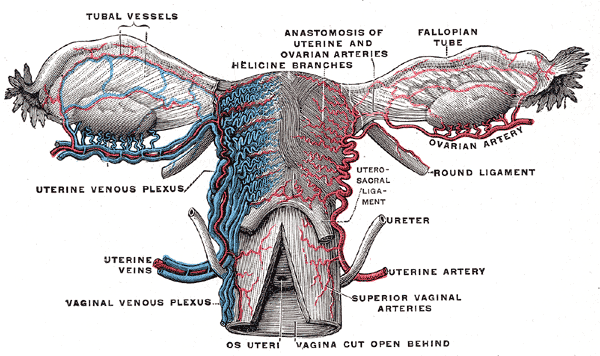

The stroma is highly vascularised. The ovarian artery arises from the abdominal aorta and supplies oxygenated blood to the ovary. The ovarian vein drains deoxygenated blood from the ovary to the inferior vena cava or one of its tributaries. The vessels are located within the suspensory ligament of the ovary.

== Development ==
The ovaries develop in early embryogenesis from the genital ridge (or gonadal ridge), following sexual differentiation. The sex of an organism is determined at the time of fertilization, but differentiation only takes place around six weeks later.

An initially expressed gene in the development of the genitourinary system is WT1 that regulates the formation of the genital ridge (and of the kidneys). In the front half of the genital ridge steroidogenic factor 1 (SF-1) is expressed in the somatic cells, and acts a transcription factor. SF-1 plays an important role in sexual differentiation in the gonad, and in the functioning of Leydig cells. SF1 is expressed later in the steroidogenic thecal and granulosa cells of the ovarian follicles. SF1 levels are low during embryonic development but increase during adolescence and during follicle maturity. SF1 regulates gene expression in the theca and granulosa cells necessary for the function of the ovary.

At birth the ovaries lie in the lower part of the iliac fossae, with the long axis of the ovary being almost vertical. In early childhood the ovaries continue their descent to reach the ovarian fossae. The neonatal ovaries are between one and 3.6 mm long and together have a weight of 0.3 grams. At six weeks of age the ovaries have doubled in weight. There are also furrows seen in the ovarian surface but these disappear by the third month.

== Ovarian aging ==
At the fourth month of fetal life, follicles number between 6 and 7 million. At birth, the number of follicles has declined to between one and two million, and at puberty the number is decreased to 300,000–400,000. During the reproductive years these follicles undergo atresia at the rate of 1,000 a month, and at menopause the final stage of ovarian aging the ovaries are left with approximately 1000 follicles. Below this threshold regular ovarian cycles cannot be maintained.

With the decline in follicle numbers there is a decline in oocyte quality due to meiotic nondisjunction. After the age of 31, the ability to conceive decreases and the probability of chromosomal abnormalities including aneuploidy increases in the early embryo, that can also be the cause of miscarriages.

Fertility is optimum between the ages of 20 and 30. Around the age of 45, the follicle pool decreases significantly and the menstrual cycle begins to change. Various genetic and endocrine factors influence ovarian aging and the age at the start of menopause. In some women, the follicle pool diminishes before the age of 40, and this is known as premature menopause or premature ovarian failure (POF). Mutations in the genes GDF9 and BMP15 have been identified as candidate genes for POF. POF has a relation with chromosome X abnormalities, particularly with regard to fragile X-associated primary ovarian insufficiency.

Several genes related to mitochondrial function are also associated with ovarian aging. In the granulosa cells of follicles in women over the age of 38 there is a decrease in the numbers of normal mitochondrial DNA and an increase in mutated mtDNA.

A genetic mutation in the DNA repair gene BRCA1 causes premature memopause. This suggests that naturally occurring DNA damages in oocytes are repaired less efficiently leading to early reproductive failure. The BRCA1 protein plays a key role in a type of DNA repair termed homologous recombinational repair, which is the only cellular process that can repair DNA double-strand breaks. Double-strand breaks accumulate with age in primordial follicles. Homologous recombinational repair is especially promoted during meiosis. It was also found that expression of four key genes necessary for repair of double-strand breaks (BRCA1, MRE11, RAD51, and ATM) declines with age in the oocytes. They hypothesized that DNA double-strand break repair is vital for the maintenance of oocyte reserve and that a decline in efficiency of repair with age plays a key role in ovarian aging. A study identified 290 genetic determinants of ovarian aging, also found that DNA damage response processes are implicated, and suggests that possible effects of extending fertility in women would improve bone health, reduce risk of type 2 diabetes, and increase the risk of hormone-sensitive cancers.

A variety of testing methods can be used to determine fertility based on maternal age. Many of these tests measure levels of hormones FSH and GnrH. Methods such as measuring anti-Müllerian hormone (AMH) levels and antral follicle count (AFC) can predict ovarian aging. AMH levels serve as an indicator of ovarian aging since the quality of ovarian follicles can be determined.

== Clinical significance ==
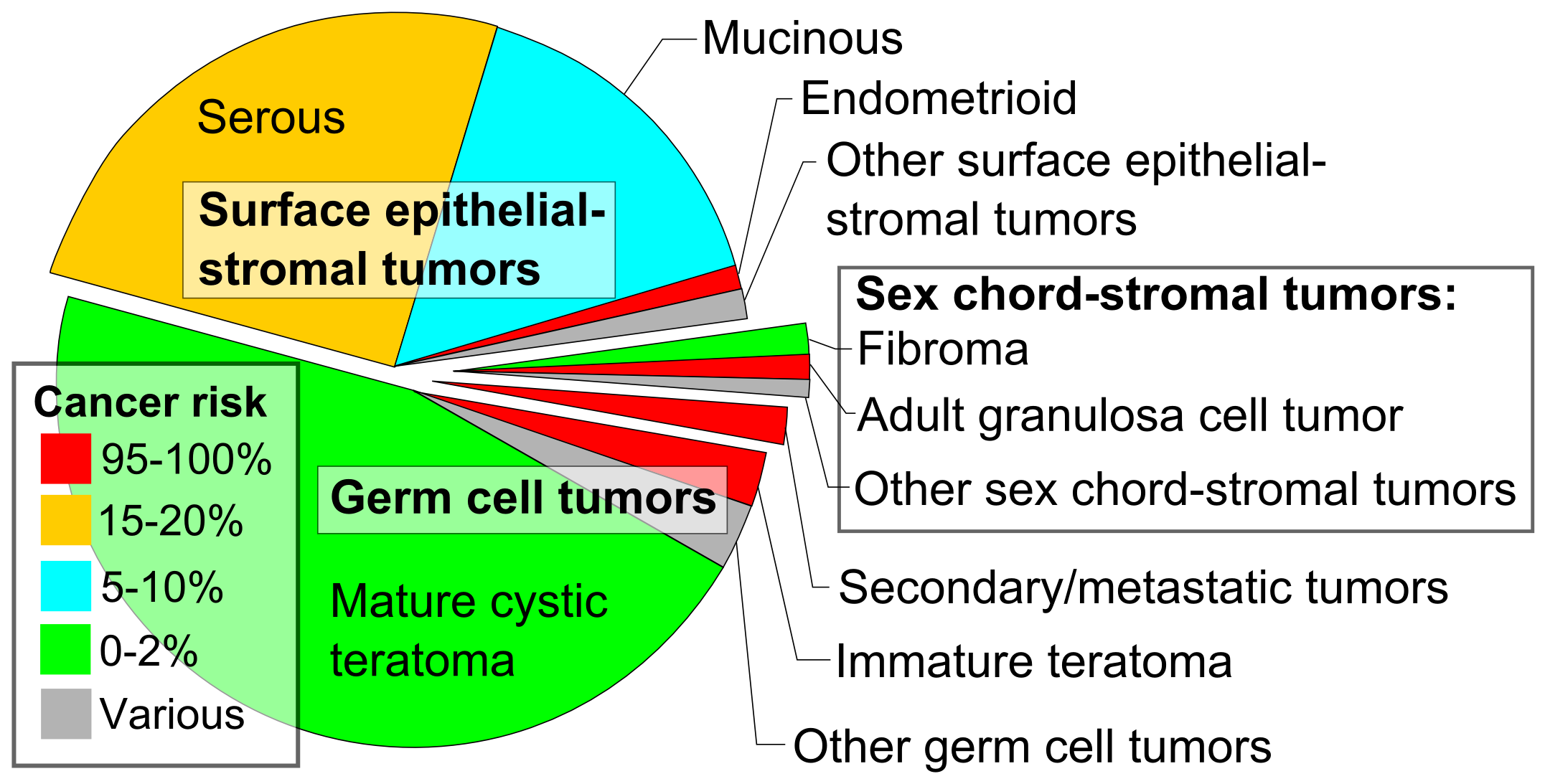
Incidence and cancer risk of ovarian tumors

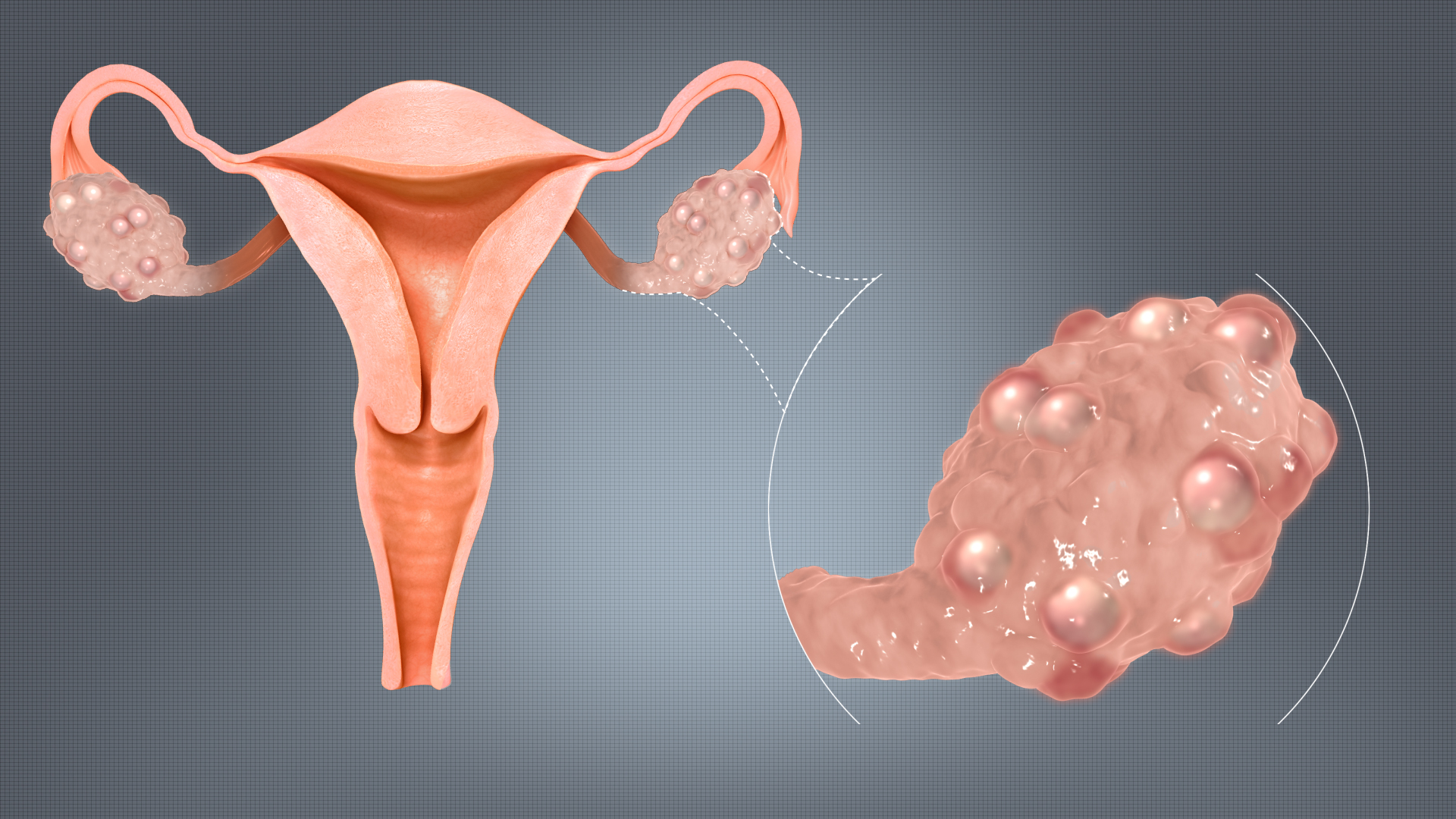
Polycystic ovaries typically found in polyendocrine metabolic ovarian syndrome

Ovarian torsion in which the ovary is twisted on its ligaments restricting blood supply

Ovarian diseases can be classified as endocrine disorders or as a disorders of the reproductive system. Ovarian diseases include ovarian tumors such as ovarian germ cell tumors, ovarian cancers, and different types of ovarian cyst. Other ovarian disorders include inflammation (oophoritis), diminished functional activity (hypogonadism), failure to ovulate (annovulation), and twisting (ovarian torsion), or rupture (apoplexy) of the ovary. The ovaries may be affected by the growth of endometrial-like tissue on them (endometriosis).

If the egg fails to release from the follicle in the ovary, an ovarian cyst may form. Small ovarian cysts are common in healthy women. Some women have more follicles than usual caused by polyendocrine metabolic ovarian syndrome (PMOS), a hormonal disorder which inhibits the follicles from growing normally, and this will cause cycle irregularities.

The surgical removal or one or both ovaries is called an oophorectomy.

Some types of cancer therapy can negatively impact fertility. An option to preserve this is ovarian tissue cryopreservation where some of the tissue of the ovary cortex is removed and frozen to be replaced near to the remaining tissue after therapy completion. Tissue cryopreservation is also carried out in those who wish to postpone pregnancy, or to delay menopause. Another option to safeguard the ovaries during treatment is ovarian transposition which repositions the ovaries to a safer more shielded nearby location. Both options can be performed by laparoscopy.

=== Disorders of sex development ===
Ovotesticular syndrome is a rare congenital condition of atypical sexual differentiation where an individual is born with both ovarian and testicular tissue. It is one of the rarest disorders of sex development, with an incidence rate of approximately one in 100,000 live births. Commonly, one or both gonads is an ovotestis containing both types of tissue. Although it is similar in some ways to mixed gonadal dysgenesis, the conditions can be distinguished histologically.

== History ==
Aristotle referred to ovarectomy in Historia Animalium, in sows to stimulate growth and fatness, and in female war camels to sterilize them. However, he believed that embryos are formed when the seed of a male (produced by the sperm ducts, rather than the testicles) plants into the soil of a female (probably referring to menstrual blood), and did not subscribe to the significance of gonads in heredity. He also observed that spayed females cease to go into estrus.

Herophilus was the first to describe the ovaries and the oviducts. He called the ovaries the "female testes" and gave the female equal credit with the male for producing the fetus. He thought the ovaries produced female seeds, and the testicles produced male seeds. The female seeds travel through the fallopian tubes and combine with the male seed in the uterus (not the fallopian tubes), thus producing an embryo. Soranus of Ephesus gave a detailed description of the ovaries. Galen in On Semen argued that both the testicles and the ovaries contribute to the embryo, but the testicles contribute more since they are larger.

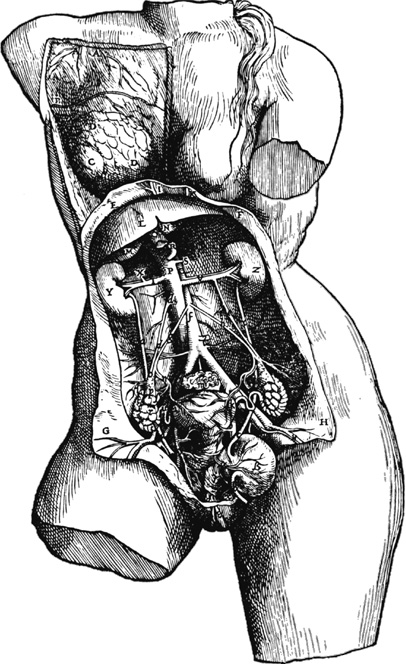
De Humani Corporis Fabrica: first representation of the ovaries. The ovaries are clearly shown as bumpy, representing the follicles

Vesalius, by dissecting women of reproductive age, discovered the follicles with fluid within "white and like a milky serum", as well as a yellow substance likely to be the corpus luteum. He also noted the ovaries are bumpy. Fabricius observed that in the hen, yolk is formed in the ovary, while the white and the shell are formed during the transit through the oviduct. He also made the first illustration of the corpus luteum in De Formato Foetu (1604) and called it "numerous conjoined little glands". Carlo Ruini noted that the ovaries of the fetal mare are up to 4 times as large as the mother's.

Nicolas Steno in 1667 hypothesized that the ovaries of mammals are analogous to the ovaries of birds, and thus they too contain eggs (rather than the "female semen"). In 1675, he described the ovaries of various animals and hypothesized that she-mules are infertile because their ovaries do not produce eggs. De Graaf made a full-length study of the female reproductive system. He thought the whole follicle was an egg, and proved it by cooking and eating the liquid inside follicles and noting that it had the same color, taste, and consistency as cooked egg-white. He stated that the number of corpus luteum is the same as the number of fetuses, and it only occurs after coitus (he was observing rabbits, who have induced ovulation). He also thought the corpus luteum is the scar tissue left behind after the egg is shed from the ovary. He observed that the corpus luteum is yellow in cows, red in sheep, and ashen in others. Drelincourt in 1685 suggested that the follicle is not the egg, and that the true egg is much smaller, and within the follicle. Malpighi speculated that the follicle never leaves the ovary, but remains within. The true egg is much smaller and within the follicle, and leaves the ovary. He also coined the term "corpus luteum" [Latin for "yellow body"] because he worked with the cow's ovaries, in which the corpus luteum is yellow. Boerhaave clearly stated the currently accepted theory that the ovum escapes from the ovary, leaving scar tissue of the corpus luteum, and passes down the fallopian tube, is fertilized by a sperm within the tube, then enters the uterus.

There was a controversy during the period about how reproduction works. Some like Harvey agreed with Aristotle that the ovaries are unimportant. Some like Wharton, Descartes, and Le Grand, agreed with Galen that the ovaries produced female semen that mixes with male semen to produce an embryo. The new "ovism" school, like Steno and de Graaf, thought the ovaries in mammals worked like the ovaries in birds: The entire follicle is an egg. The egg is fertilized in the ovary. Only fertilized eggs can leave the ovary. The new "animalculism" school believed only the sperm contained the generative principle.

John Huner experimentally removed one ovary from a sow and compared her with a sow with two ovaries. He noted that the half-spayed sow became infertile after producing 76 piglets, but continued to go into estrus. The other sow produced 162 piglets; thus, he proposed that each ovary could produce a fixed number of offspring. Percival Pott reported in 1775 that he removed two herniated ovaries from a woman, after which she became thinner, lost her large breasts, and ceased menstruation. This was the first accurate description of the effect of ovariectomy in humans. In 1827, von Baer first described and illustrated the mammalian egg within the follicle.

Albert Peuch in 1873 stated that spaying young sows prevented subsequent growth in the uterus. Emil Knauer showed that transplanting ovaries into the abdominal cavity in spayed dogs, rabbits, and guinea pigs prevented this uterine atrophy, similar to the testicle transplant experiment of Berthold in 1849. Prenant in 1898 concluded by histology that the corpus luteum was an endocrine gland. Ludwig Fraenkel Vilhelm Magnus both showed independently in 1901 that spaying pregnant rabbits or removing their corpora lutea by thermocautery resulted in abortion or resorption of the embryos. Leo Loeb noted in 1906 that traumatizing the endometrium of a nonpregnant guinea pig or rabbit resulted in formation of placenta or deciduoma, but this did not happen if corpora lutea were removed. In 1915, Edmund Herrmann, an Austrian obstetrician, showed that a lipid extract of pig's corpora lutea produced a fully progestational endometrium when injected into immature rabbits. This line of work was continued by Corner and Allen, resulting in the discovery of progesterone. Leo Loeb also showed in 1911 that removing the corpora lutea hastened the next ovulation. (Makepeace et al, 1937) showed specifically that injecting progesterone inhibited ovulation in rabbits. This eventually resulted in hormonal contraception.

== Other animals ==
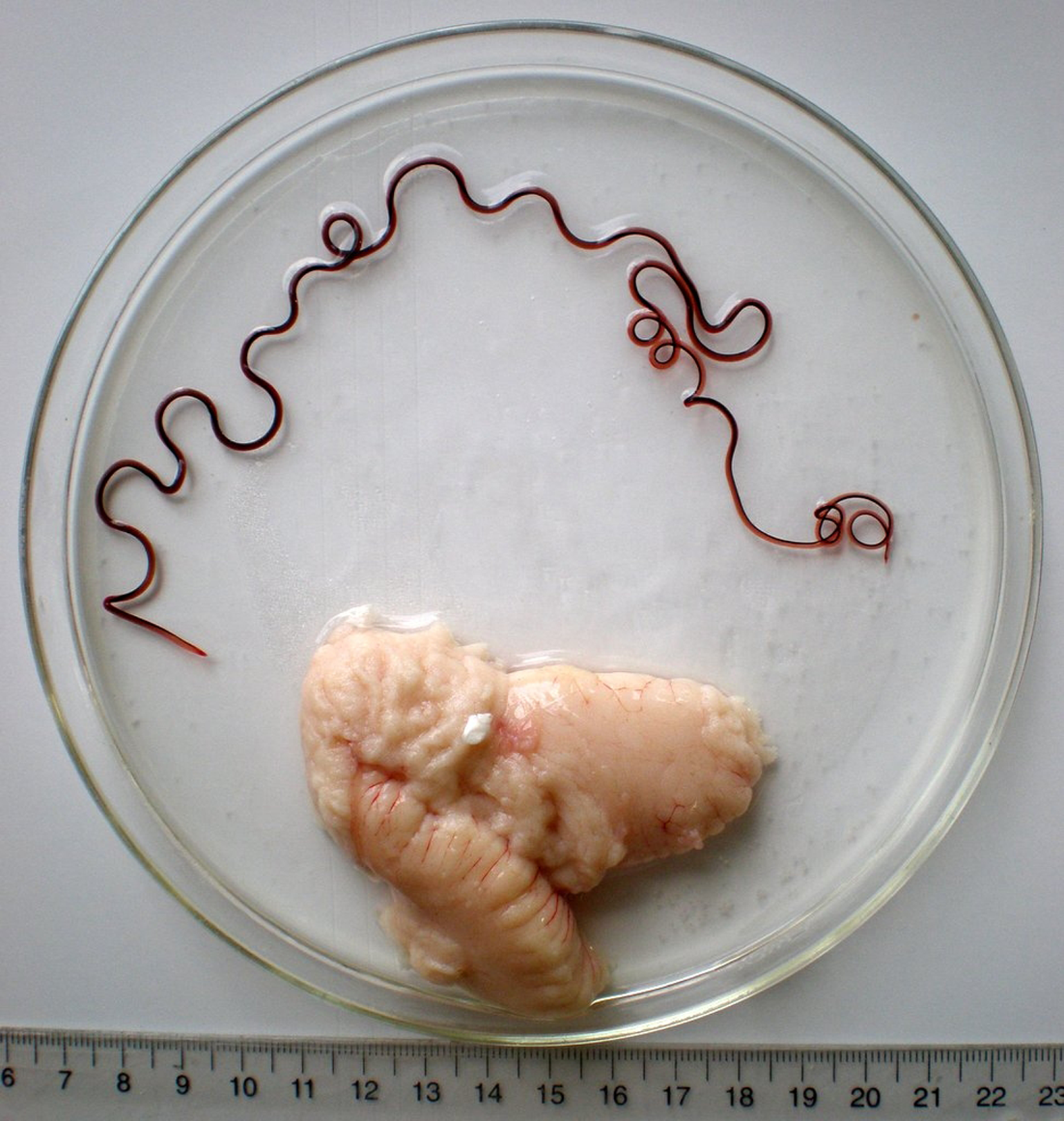
Ovary of a marine fish and its parasite, the nematode Philometra fasciati

The ovaries of Old World primates such as macaques and great apes share many structural and functional features with those of humans. In rhesus monkeys (Macaca mulatta), the number of ovarian follicles declines with advancing age, and the monkeys reach menopause by the age of 25–30 years. Ovarian follicles are depleted with age also in chimpanzees (Pan troglodytes), which reach menopause at around the age of 50 years. New World primates for which information is available include tamarins (Saguinus spp.) marmosets (Callithrix jacchus) and squirrel monkeys (Saimiri sciureus). In aging squirrel monkeys, the loss of follicles is accompanied by the (apparently benign) proliferation in both ovaries of granulosa cells that resemble granulosa cell tumors in humans.

Birds have only one functional ovary (the left), while the other remains vestigial. In mammals, including humans, the female ovary is homologous to the male testicle, in that they are both gonads and endocrine glands. Ovaries of some kind are found in the female reproductive system of many invertebrates that employ sexual reproduction. However, they develop in a very different way in most invertebrates than they do in vertebrates, and are not truly homologous.

Many of the features found in human ovaries are common to all vertebrates, including the presence of follicular cells, tunica albuginea, and so on. However, many species produce a far greater number of eggs during their lifetime than do humans, so that, in fish and amphibians, there may be hundreds, or even millions of fertile eggs present in the ovary at any given time. In these species, fresh eggs may be developing from the germinal epithelium throughout life. Corpora lutea are found only in mammals, and in some elasmobranch fish; in other species, the remnants of the follicle are quickly resorbed by the ovary. In birds, reptiles, and monotremes, the egg is relatively large, filling the follicle and distorting the shape of the ovary at maturity.

Amphibians and reptiles have no ovarian medulla; the central part of the ovary is a hollow, lymph-filled space.

The ovary of teleosts is also often hollow, but in this case, the eggs are shed into the cavity, which opens into the oviduct. Certain nematodes of the genus Philometra are parasitic in the ovary of marine fishes and can be spectacular, with females as long as 40 cm (16 in), coiled in the ovary of a fish half this length. Although most female vertebrates have two ovaries, this is not the case in all species. In most birds and in platypuses, the right ovary never matures, so that only the left is functional. (Exceptions include the kiwi and some, but not all raptors, in which both ovaries persist.) In some elasmobranchs, only the right ovary develops fully. In the primitive jawless fish, and some teleosts, there is only one ovary, formed by the fusion of the paired organs in the embryo.

== Additional images ==
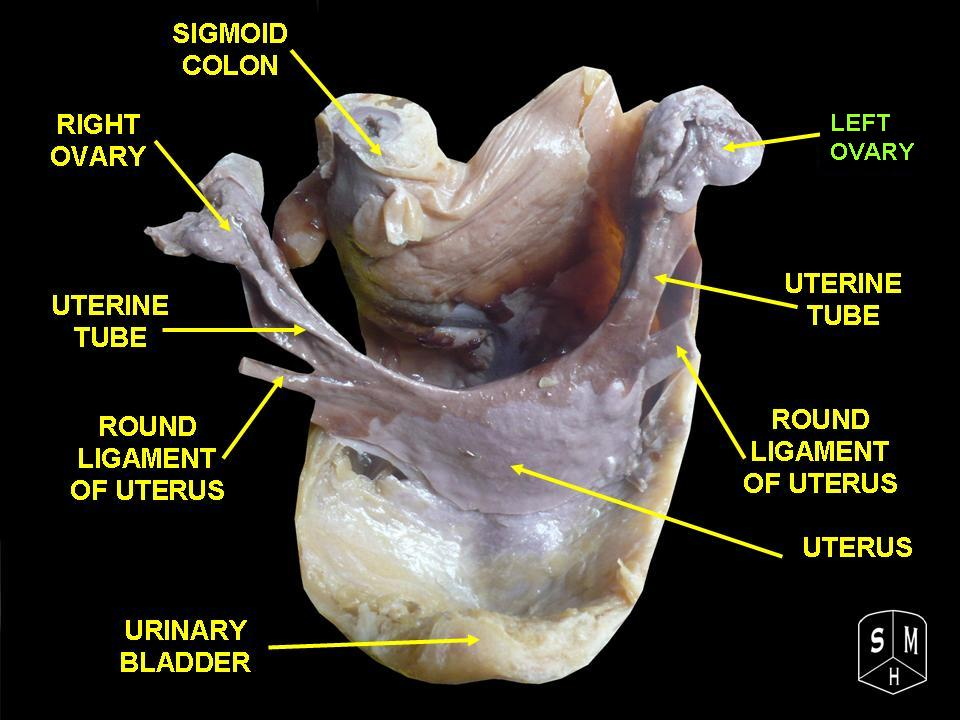
Left ovary

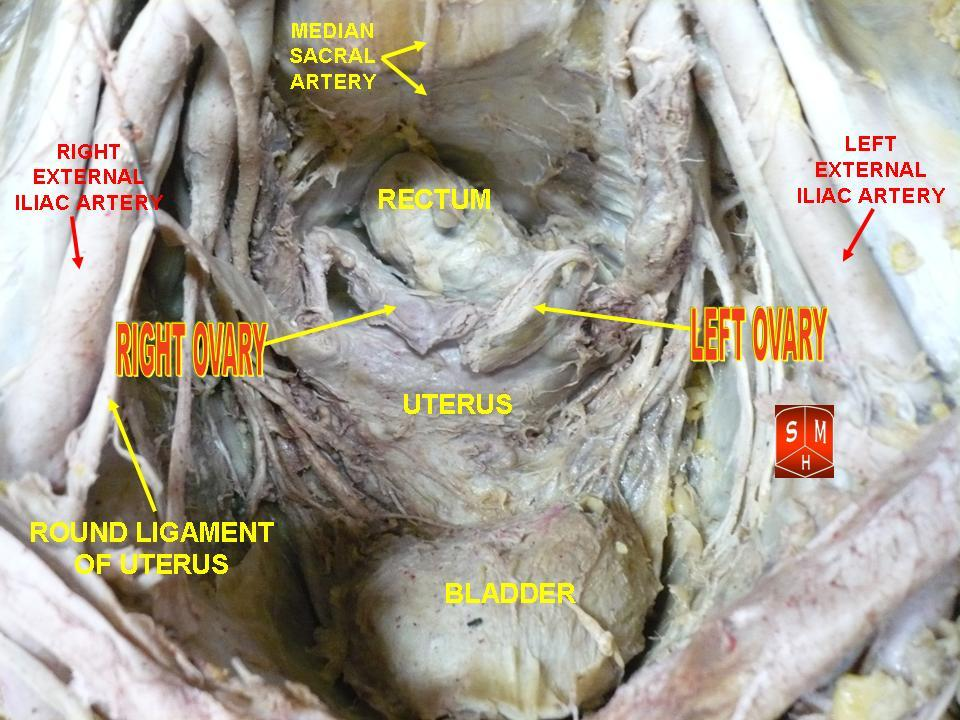
Ovaries

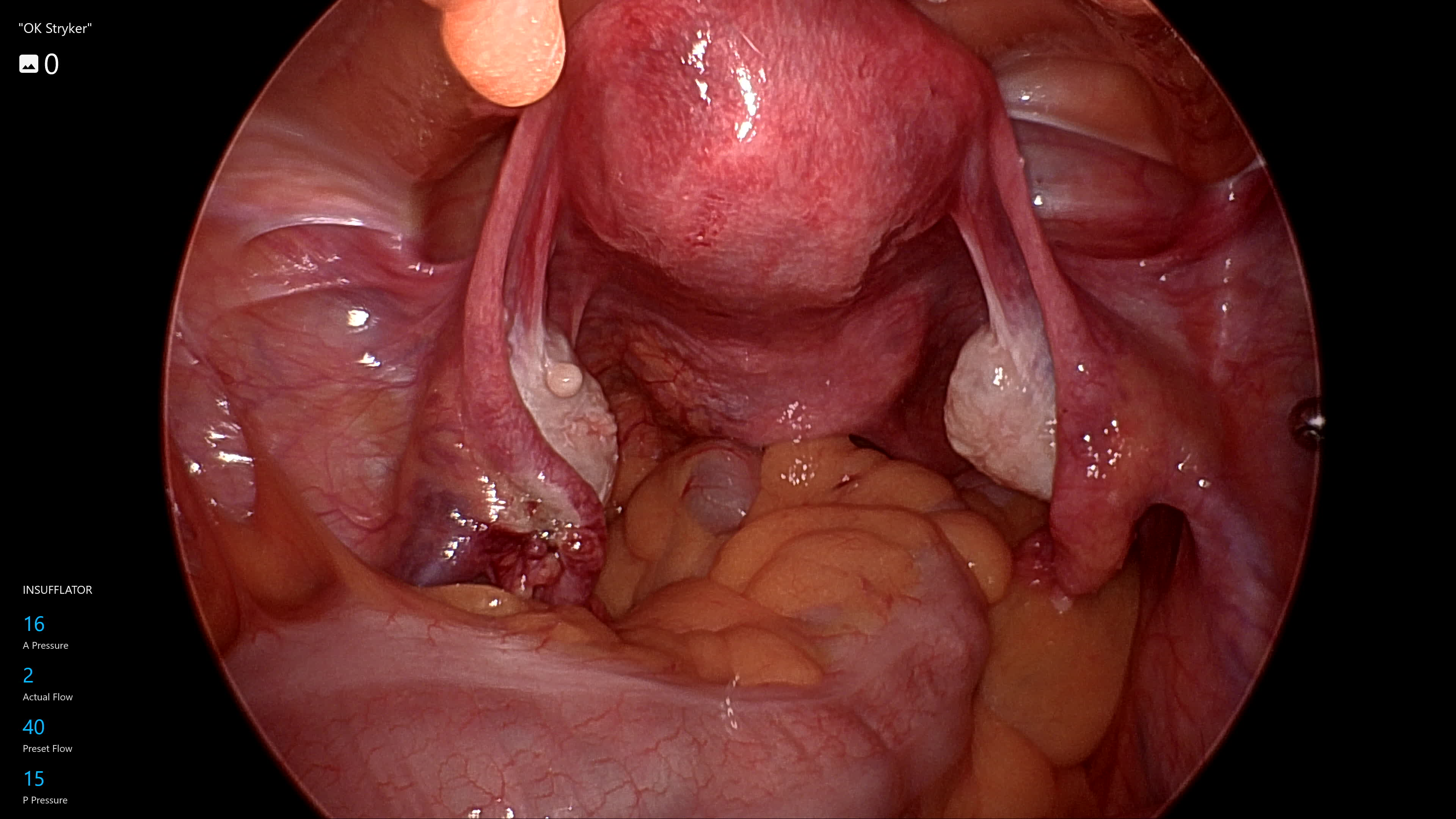
Uterus, fallopian tubes, and ovaries

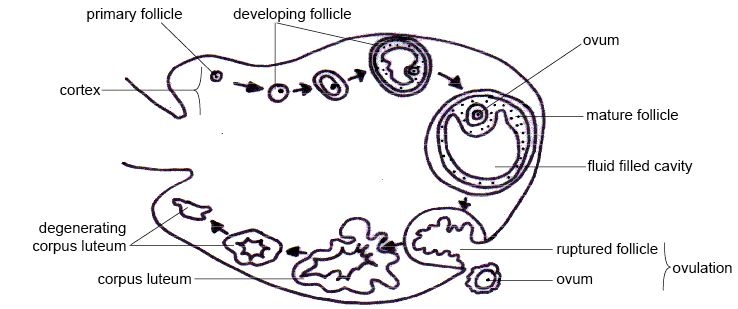
The process of egg cell production and ovulation in a human ovary

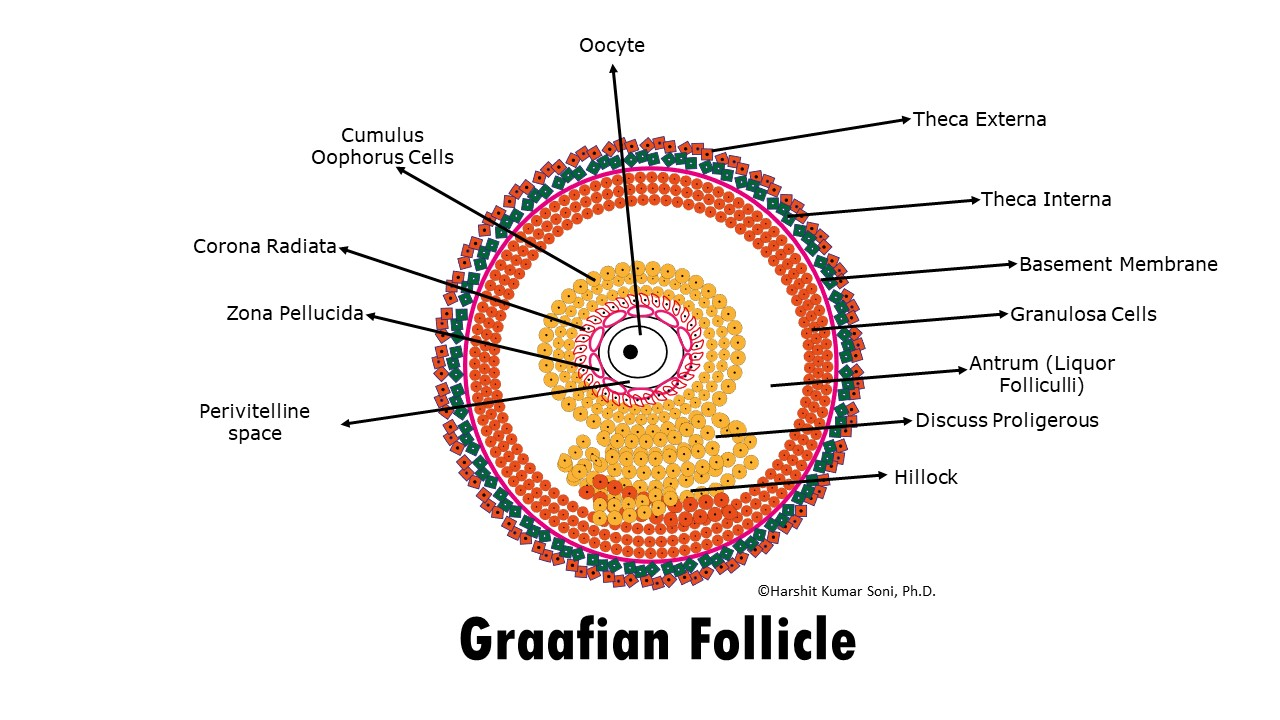
A labelled mature follicle also known as a Graafian follicle

== See also ==
- Artificial ovary
- Ovarian drilling
- Ovarian culture

== Bibliography ==
- Venes, Donald (2013). Taber's cyclopedic medical dictionary. Philadelphia: F.A. Davis. ISBN 978-0-8036-2979-0.
