= Galenic corpus =

Writings of the ancient Greek Physician

The Galenic corpus is the collection of writings of Galen, a prominent Greek physician, surgeon and philosopher in the Roman Empire during the second century CE. Several of the works were written between 165–175 CE.

== Description ==
Galen produced more work than any author in antiquity, His surviving work runs to over 2.6 million words, and many more of his writings are now lost.

Karl Gottlob Kühn of Leipzig (1754–1840) published an edition of 122 of Galen's writings between 1821 and 1833. His edition, which is the most complete, although flawed, consists of the Greek text with facing-page Latin translation. The text and translation are mainly taken from the edition of Chartier 1638—39, Paris. Kühn's edition runs to 22 volumes, 676 index pages, being over 20,000 pages in length. More modern projects like the Corpus Medicorum Graecorum have still to match the Kühn edition. A digital version of the Galenic corpus, largely taken from Kühn's edition but using newer editions where available, is included in the Thesaurus Linguae Graecae, a digital library of Greek literature started in 1972. Another useful modern source is the French Bibliothèque interuniversitaire de santé (BIU Santé). According to Susan Mattern the most modern edition of the Galenic corpus is one-eighth of all classical Greek literature that survives.

== List ==
With Greek and Latin Titles and standardized bibliographical abbreviations: Liddell & Scott: Greek-English Lexicon. See also Cambridge Companion to Galen: Appendices. Vol. and pp. notation according to Kühn edition). Ordered according to Coxe's taxonomy of 1846 (see References), which includes a summary of each work. Alternative names in (parentheses). Italicised citations from Galen's works refer to the Kühn edition.

Galen's own Bibliographies

- On My (His) Own Books (Lib. Prop.)
- On the Order of my Own Books (Ord. Lib. Prop.)

=== Introductory Treatises (Prolegomena, Εἰσαγωγή (Eisagôgê), Introductio) ===
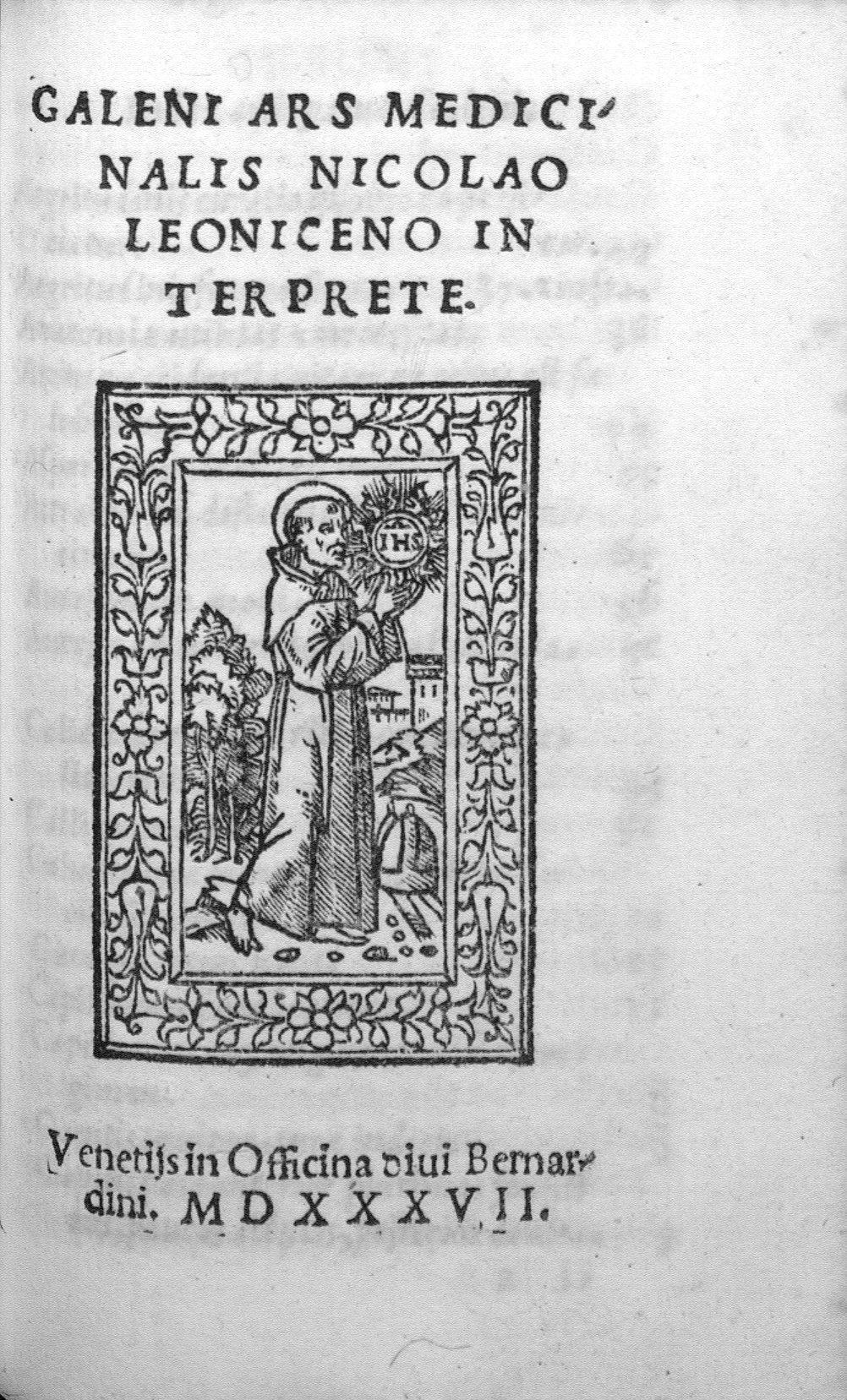
Ars medicinalis

2. The Best Doctor is also a Philosopher (A good physician must also be a philosopher) Si quis Optimus Medicus est, Eundum esse Philosophum (Opt. Med.))
3. Of verbal sophistry De Sophismatis in Verbo Contingentibus (Soph.)
5. Of the appropriate writings of Galen. De Libris Propriis (Galeni) (Lib. Prop.)
6. Of the order in which his writings are to be placed. De Ordine Librorum Suorum
7. Of different sects in medicine (On Sects) De Sectis
10. An exposition of the empiric sect De Subfiguratio(ne) Empirica (Subf. Empir.)
12. Of the art of medicine. De Constitutione Artis Medicae
16. Of the art of medicine. Ars Medicinalis

=== I: Physiology and Anatomy ===
1. On The Elements According to Hippocrates De elementis secundum Hippocratem (Elem.)
2. Of temperaments (On Mixtures): Περί κράσεων (peri kraseon); De Temperamentis (Temp.); book III was also translated as De Complexionibus (On the Complexions)
3. Two commentaries of Galen on the books of Hippocrates, entitled, “Of the Nature of Man.” Galeni, in Librum Hippocratis, de Natura Humana (HNH)
4. Of the atrabilis, or black bile. De Atra Bile, Libellus (Atr. Bil.) (At. Bil.)
7. Of the bones (On Bones for Beginners) De Ossibus (Oss.)
11. Is blood naturally contained in the arteries? An in Arteriis (Natura) Sanguis Contineatur (An sanguis in arteriis natura contineatur) (Art. Sang.)
12. On Anatomical Procedures (Investigations) De Anatomicis Administrationibus (AA)
13. Of the dissection of the uterus (On the Anatomy of the Uterus) De Uteri Dissectione (Ut. Diss.)
15. Of the uses of the different parts of the human body (On the Usefulness/Utility of the Parts of the Body) De Usu Partium Corporis Humani (UP)
16. Of the utility of respiration De Usu (Utilitate) Respirationis
17. Of the causes of respiration De Causis Respirationis
18. Of the use of the pulse De Usu Pulsuum (Pulsuum Usu)
19. On the subsistence of the Natural Faculties De Substantia Facultatum Naturalium
20. Of the dogmas, or opinions of (On the Doctrines of) Hippocrates and Plato De Hippocratis et Platonis Decretis (Dogmatibus) (PHP) V
21. Of the natural faculties De Facultatibus Naturalibus (De Naturalibus Facultatibus) (Nat. Fac.) II
23. Of the motion (movement) of the thorax (chest) and lungs De Motu Thoracis et Pulmonis
24. That the qualities of the mind depend on the temperament of the body Quod Animi Mores Corporis Temperatura Sequantur
25. Of the foetal formation De Foetuum Formatione (Foet. Form.)
26. Of the semen (On Semen) De Semine

=== II: Hygiene ===
Of the faculties or powers of aliments (On the Powers of Foods) De Alimentorum Facultatibus (Alim. Fac.)
On Good and Bad Humours (Bon. Mal. Suc.)
On the Ptisan, or Barley-water De Ptisana
On the Preservation of Health De Sanitate Tuenda (San. Tu.)

=== III: Etiology ===
1.4. Of (On) the Causes of Symptoms De Symptomatum Causis (Caus. Symp.)
8. Of plethora De Plenitudine (Plen.)
14. Of procatartic causes (On Antecedent Causes) De Causis Procatarcticis (CP)
15. Commentary On Hippocrates' 'Epidemics' In Hippocratis de Morbis Vulgaribus, Commentarii (Hipp. Epid.)

=== IV: Semeiotics ===
1. On the parts affected by disease (On Affected Parts) De Locis Affectis (Loc. Aff.)
2. A concise treatise on the pulse for students (On the Pulse for Beginners) De Pulsibus Libellus ad Tyrones (Puls.)
3. Of the difference of pulses De Differentiis Pulsuum (Diff. Puls.)
4. On the knowledge of the pulse De Dignoscendis Pulsibus (De Pulsuum Differentiis) (Dig. Puls.)
5. On the causes of the pulse De Causis Pulsuum (Caus. Puls.)
6. Of prediction from the pulse De Praesagitione ex Pulsibus (Praes. Puls.)
7. Synopsis of his sixteen books on the pulse Synopsis Librorum Suorum, Sexdecim, de Pulsibus (Syn. Puls.)
12. Commentaries on the prognostics of Hippocrates (On Hippocrates' 'Prognostic') In Prognostica Hippocratis Comment. (Hipp. Prog.)
13. On indication (Diagnosis) from Dreams De Dignotione ex Insomniis Libellus
14. On Prognosis De Praegnotione ad Epigenem (Praen.) V

=== V: Pharmacy ===
On the Powers (and Mixtures) of Simple remedies (Drugs) De Simp. Medicament. Facultatibus (SMT)
On Remedies Easy to Prepare: Περι ευποριστων (Peri euporiston); De Remediis Parabilibus
Of medicinal substitutes (On Substitute Drugs) De Substitutis Medicinis (Suc.)
Of the faculty or power of purgative remedies (On the Power of Cleansing Drugs) De Purgantium Medicamentorum Facultate (Purg. Med. Fac.)
Whom, with which, and at what time to purge (Whom to Purge, with what Cleansing Drugs and When) Quos Purgare Conveniat, Quibus Medicamentis, et Quo Tempore (Cath. Med. Purg.)
Of the theriaca (On Theriac to Piso) De Theriaca, ad Pisonem (Ther. Pis.)
On the use of the theriaca (On Theriac to Pamphilianus) De Usu Thericae, ad Pamphilianum
On Antidotes De Antidotis (Ant.)
Of the composition of local remedies De Compositione Medicamentorum Localium
On the Composition of Drugs (Medical Compounds) according to Places De Compositione Medicamentorum Secundum Locus (Comp. Med. (Sec.) Loc.)
Of the compounding of remedies in relation with their genera (On the Composition of Drugs according to Kind) De Compositione Medicamentorum per Genera (Comp. Med. per Gen.)
Of weights and measures De Ponderibus et Mensuris Libellus

=== VI: Instruments of Clinical Practice ===
Of venæsection in opposition to Erasistratus De Venæsectione, Adversus Erasistratum (Ven. Sect. Er.)
Of venæsection, (Bloodletting) in opposition to Erasistratus De Venae Sectione Adversus Erasistrateos Romae Degentes (Ven. Sect. Er. Rom.) XI:197-249
Of venæsection, in opposition to Erasistratus of Rome De Venasectione Adversus Erasistrataeos qui Romae Degebant

=== VII: Therapeutics ===
1. Of the method of curing diseases (On The Therapeutic Method) De Medendi Methodo, Seu de Morb. Curandis (De Methodo Medendi) (MM)
4. Of remedies of easy preparation (On Remedies Easy to Prepare) De Remediis Paratu Facilibus Libellus (Rem.)
12. Three commentaries on the Hippoc. treatise of the office of the physician. In Hippocratis de Officina Medici (In Hippocratem de Officina Medici)(Hipp. Off. Med.)

=== Additional works ===
Commentary on Hippocrates' Aphorisms In Aphorismos Hippoc. (In Hippocratis Aphorismos) (Hp. Aph. Com.) (Hipp. Aph.)
On Consolation from Grief (De indolentia) (Ind.)

Newly discovered in 2005

=== Spurious ===
On the Power of Centaura De Virtute Centaureae

=== Fragments ===
==== Other (not in Coxe taxonomy) ====
On Medical Experience De Experientia Medica (Med. Exp.)
On Language and Ambiguity (Fallacies due to language) De Captionibus penes Dictionem

On Containing Causes De Causis Contentivus (CC)
On Demonstration Dem.
On My (His) Own Opinions De Proprius Placitis (Prop. Plac.)

Was fragmentary in 1979; a complete Greek text was discovered in Thessalonica in 2005

On Examinations by Which the Best Physicians Are Recognised
Exhortation to the Study of the Arts especially Medicine: To Menodotus
On Things said in Many Ways
Opportune Moments in Disease (Morb. Temp.)
On the affections of the mind
The Passions of the Soul De Propriorum Animi Cuiuslibet Affectuum Dignotione et Curatione (Aff. Dig.) V:40-1
On Moral Character (Mor.)
The Faculties of the Soul Follow the Mixture of the Body (QAM)
On Propositions Missed out in the Expression of Demonstrations
On Propositions With the Same Meaning
On Slander De calumnia in quo et de vita sua
On Sects for Beginners De Sectis Ingredientibus (SI)
Introduction to Logic Institutio Logica (Inst. Log.)

Adversus Julianum (Adv. Jul.)
De Optima Doctrina (Opt. Doct.)
De Animi Cuiuslibet Peccatorum Dignotione et Curatione (Pecc. Dig.)

Hippocratic commentaries

On the Elements according to Hippocrates (Hipp. Elem.)
On the Doctrines of Hippocrates and Plato De Placitis Hippocratis et Platonis (PHP) V
Commentary on Hippocrates' Aphorisms (Hp. Aph. Com.)
On Hippocrates' 'Epidemics' (Hipp. Epid.)
On Hippocrates' 'Prognostic' (Hipp. Prog.)
Commentary On Hippocrates' On the Nature of Man (HNH)

Collections

On Food and Diet. Grant M (trans.) Routledge 2000: 7 treatises

On the Humours
On Black Bile (Atr. Bil.)
On the Powers of Foods De alimentorum facultatibus (Alim. fac.)
On Uneven Bad Temperament (Inaeq. Int.)
On the Causes of Disease (Caus. Morb.)
On Barley

=== Collections ===
- Kühn, C.G. (ed.) Claudii Galeni Opera Omnia. Leipzig: C. Cnobloch, 1821–1833, rpt. Hildesheim: Georg Olms, 1964-5. (Greek, Latin trans.) Editio Kuchniana Lipsiae
- Galeni Scripta Minora. Leipzig 1884-93 3 vols. (Marquadt, Müller, Helmreich eds.) SM
- Corpus Medicorum Graecorum, Leipzig, 1914–present. Vol. V CMG
- Brock AJ. Greek Medicine, Being Extracts Illustrative of Medical Writers from Hippocrates to Galen. 1929 (repr. 1977)
- Singer PN (trans.) Selected works by Galen. OUP 1997
- Walzer R, Frede M. (trans.) Three Treatises on the Nature of Science: On the Sects for Beginners; An Outline of Empiricism; On Medical Experience. Hackett Publishing, 1985 ISBN 0-915145-92-8 ISBN 978-0-915145-92-8

==== BIUM Online sources ====
- First printed editions of Galen at the Bibliothèque Interuniversitaire de Médecine of Paris (BIUM) studies and digitized texts by the Bibliothèque interuniversitaire de santé see its digital library Medic@.

CMG Online sources

- List of Galens works by the Corpus Medicorum Graecorum with further links to digitized editions, manuscripts and modern translations.
