= Ovarian stroma =

Type of connective tissue

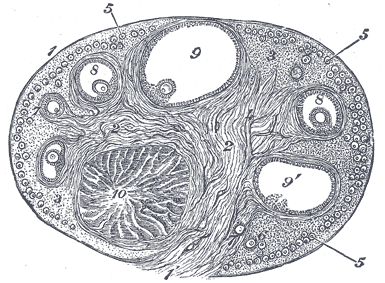
- Section of the ovary. 1. Outer covering. 1’. Attached border.: 2. Central stroma.; 3. Peripheral stroma.; 4. Blood vessels.; 5. Vesicular follicles in their earliest stage.; 6, 7, 8. More advanced follicles.: 9. An almost mature follicle.; 9’. Follicle from which the ovum has escaped.: 10. Corpus luteum.

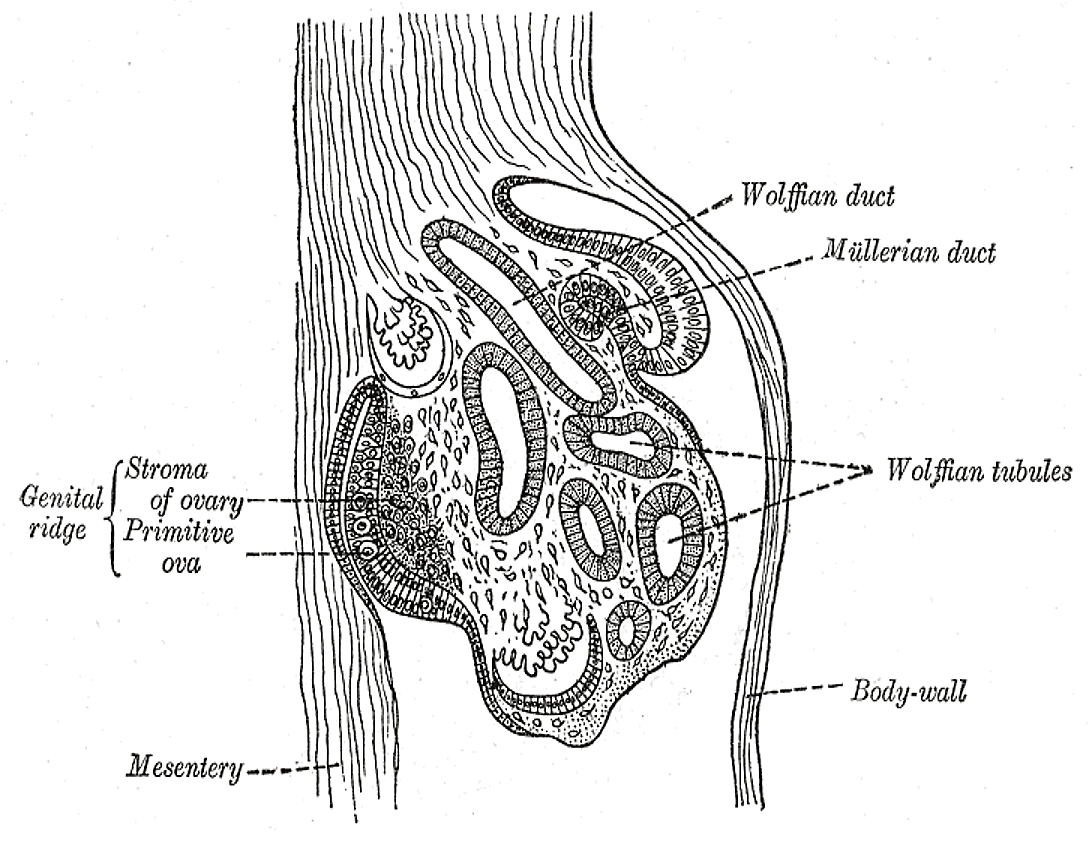
- Section of the fold in the mesonephros of a chick embryo of the fourth day. (Ovarian stroma labeled at center left.)

Details

Identifiers
- Latin: stroma ovarii

The ovarian stroma is a unique type of tissue in the ovary that gives structural and metabolic support to the functional parenchyma composed of follicles. The stroma is abundantly supplied with blood vessels, consisting for the most part of fusiform cells (spindle-shaped). These appear similar to fibroblasts. The stroma also contains ordinary connective tissue such as reticular fibers and collagen. Ovarian stroma differs from typical connective tissue in that it contains a high number of cells. The stromal cells are distributed in such a way that the tissue appears to be whorled. Stromal cells associated with maturing follicles may acquire endocrine function and secrete estrogens. The entire ovarian stroma is highly vascular.

On the surface of the organ this tissue is much condensed, and forms a layer (tunica albuginea) composed of short connective-tissue fibers, with fusiform cells between them.

The stroma of the ovary contains interstitial cells.

== See also ==
- Stroma (tissue)
- Sex cord–gonadal stromal tumour
