= Ovarian culture =

Ovarian culture is an in-vitro process that allows for the investigation of the development, toxicology and pathology of the ovary. This technique can also be used to study possible applications of fertility treatments e.g. isolating oocytes from primordial ovarian follicles that could be used for fertilisation.

== Culture methods using mouse ovarian tissue ==
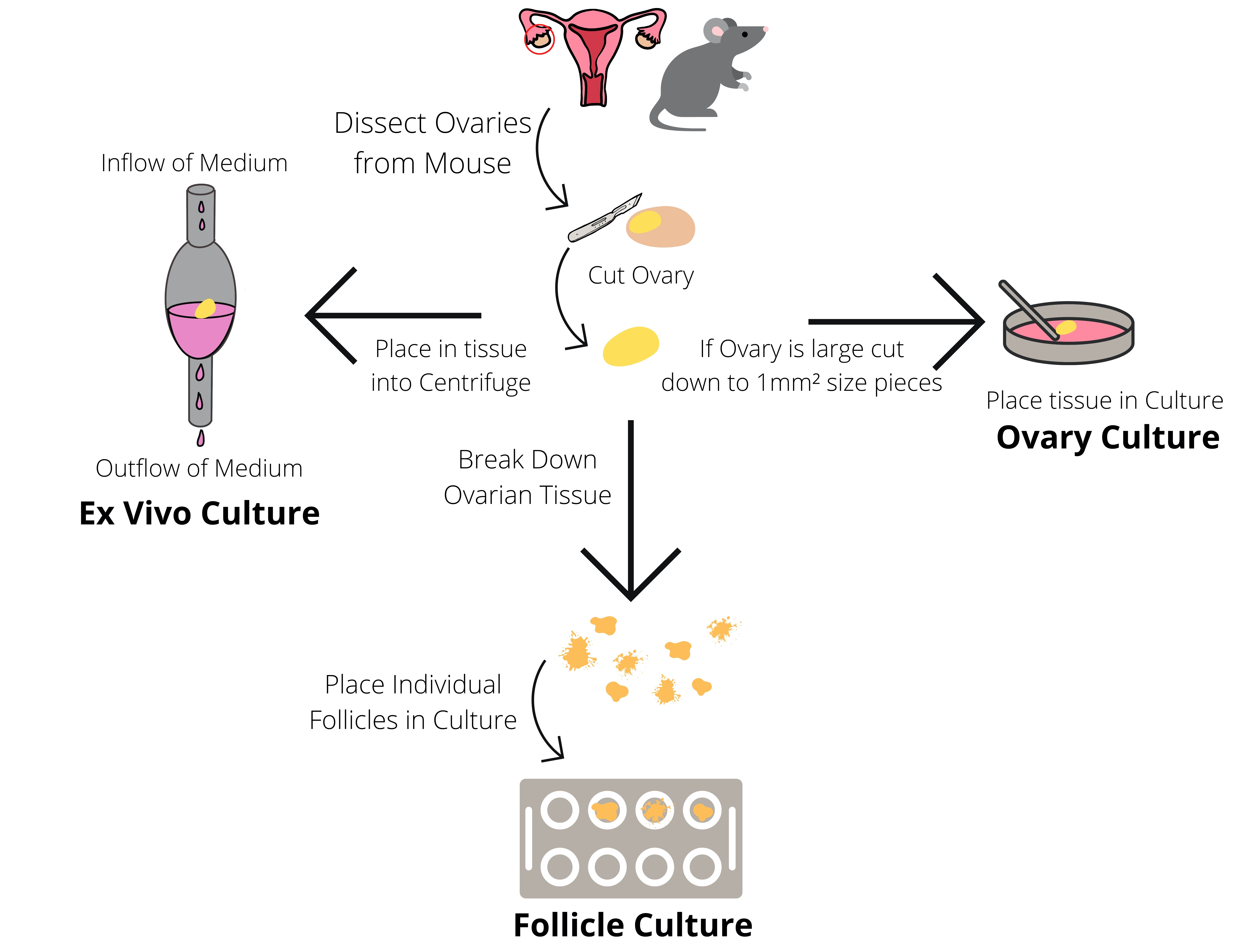
Figure 3: This diagram shows three techniques used in in-vitro culture of ovarian tissue; culture of ovarian fragments in a floating organ culture system, individual follicle culture of enzymatically digested/ minced ovarian follicles, and perfusion whole ovary in a flow-through system.

There are several culture systems which can be employed to investigate ovarian and follicular growth and development.

=== Whole ovarian culture ===
The culture of intact ovaries supports the formation and development of primordial follicles. Ovaries are dissected from neonatal mouse pups and placed into ovarian culture medium containing Bovine Serum Albumen (BSA) dissolved in α-Minimal Essential Media (αMEM). The cultures are maintained in a 37°C, 5% CO_{2} incubator and then the ovaries are frozen or fixed to facilitate further study.

=== Follicle culture ===
==== Individual ====
This method of culturing supports the growth of individual follicles from late pre-antral to pre-ovulatory stage. This system allows follicle growth and hormone production to be studied. The ovaries of young mice (19–23 days) are removed and halved, and follicles are identified under a microscope. Late pre-antral follicles are identified as having a diameter of 180-200 μm and containing 2-3 layers of granulosa cells. Follicles are manually dissected and then examined for suitability to culture. Follicles are chosen for culture only if they are healthy (diameter of 190 ± 10 μm; translucent; without dark atretic areas; intact basal lamina.) Wells containing follicle culture medium (α-Minimal Essential Media, recombinant human follicle stimulating hormone, ascorbic acid and adult female mouse serum) is overlaid with sterilised silicon oil, which prevents medium evaporation. A follicle is placed at the bottom of each well and maintained in a 37°C, 5% CO_{2} incubator, being moved into a well containing fresh medium for up to 6 days. If growth measurements are being taken visually the distortion due to the oil layer must be accounted for. Follicles are frozen or fixed so further analysis can be performed.

==== Paired ====
By culturing 2 follicles in close proximity, follicle-follicle interactions can be examined. The follicles may grow together to form a two-follicle unit. The follicles are dissected from the ovaries as above, then placed in contact with each other in pairs, in a well with follicle culture medium and sterilised silicon oil. Follicles from different genetic sources can be co-cultured so that tissue origins can be differentiated within the co-culture. The medium is replaced every 2 days and after 6 days the culture is fixed or frozen for further processing.

=== Follicle-ovary co-culture ===
This method allows follicle-ovary interactions to be studied. The ovaries and follicles are dissected as above and then one follicle is placed in contact with one pole of a neonatal ovary on a plate. The follicle-ovary plate is cultured in follicle culture medium at 37 °C, 5% CO_{2} for up to 5 days. At this point the co-culture is frozen or fixed before further processing. To facilitate differentiation between tissue origins the ovary and the follicle should be from different genetic sources.

== Uses of ovarian culture techniques ==
=== Toxicological studies ===
At present research within the field of reproductive toxicology is principally carried out in vivo, however new culture methods have been developed with the aim of allowing ovarian follicles to be grown in vitro. These new methods allow us to culture isolated ovarian follicles, embryos, ovaries (whole organ or only part of the tissue), and embryonic stem cells.Ovarian cultures are useful to research as they can allow us to replicate systematic follicle development, periodical ovulation, and follicle atresia in an environment with modulated culture conditions.The ability of in vitro ovarian cultures to detect damage to the ovary and its specialised structures of the follicles and oocytes, allows for faster screening of potential developmental and/or reproductive toxicants. Therefore, ovarian culture systems have become increasingly widely used in reproductive biology and toxicology.

Culture of the whole ovary or ovarian fragments allows evaluation of various parameters in a controlled way and, therefore, has the potential for more complete reproductive toxicity studies. A big advantage of ovarian culture is the ability to evaluate the effect of drugs on the pool of primordial follicles that make up the ovarian reserve. However, this strategy is restricted regarding the duration of culture time, as short periods may not be sufficient to ensure follicular development. On the contrary, cells may be negatively affected by longer periods of culture.

Most in vitro toxicology studies use female mice and rat models. These species have been selected to assess the adverse effects of drugs on reproductive function and fertility, due to ease of handling and small size. Additionally, these species have been well characterised; anatomically, physiologically, and genetically. Their short life cycles make it convenient to assess gestation, breastfeeding, and puberty. The relevance of animal studies for toxicological risk assessment in heterogeneous human populations remains undetermined as it is unknown if the results obtained can be extrapolated to humans.

=== Fertility treatment ===
The use of in vivo maturation in ovarian culture would eliminate the risk of Ovarian Hyperstimulation Syndrome during IVF in patients with polyendocrine metabolic ovarian syndrome (PMOS).For those without PMOS, in vitro maturation still has advantages as the process is less intense as superovulation is not required. Principles of ovarian culture can be applied to women who are resistant to FSH or oestrogen sensitive tumours. In comparison to IVF, cells used in vitro maturation are harvested at a smaller size, immature and arrested at Metaphase I stage of meiosis. Once in the lab they undergo maturation to Metaphase II.

=== Fertility preservation ===
Ovarian tissue can be harvested before ovarian damaging treatments and re-implanted at a later stage using cryopreservation. However, this method is associated with the recurrence of malignancy in those with ovarian cancer and leukaemia. In theory, ovarian tissue culture is a safer method to produce mature oocytes for fertilisation in these patients.
