= Ovarian apoplexy =

Sudden rupture in the ovary

Ovarian apoplexy is a sudden rupture in the ovary, commonly at the site of a cyst, accompanied by hemorrhage in the ovarian tissue and/or intraperitoneal bleeding.

== Symptoms and signs ==
Clinical symptoms of apoplexy associated with the basic mechanism of this disease:

This image depicts a set of ovaries, one of which is normally functioning (left), and healthy, whilst the other one has apoplexy, or the hemorrhaging of an organ. The ovary on the right's surface has been breached, and is bleeding. It has been cut off from the body's supply of nutrients and necrosis has set in. Apoplexy can also happen in the brain and the stomach.

1. Pain, which occurs primarily mid-cycle or after a minor delay in menstruation (at the time of the rupture of a corpus luteum cyst, for example). Pain is most often localized in the lower abdomen. Sometimes the pain may radiate to the rectum or to the lumbar or the umbilical region.
2. Bleeding into the abdominal cavity, which may be accompanied by:

- low blood pressure
- increase in heart rate
- weakness and dizziness
- syncope
- chills
- fever up to 38°C
- vomiting
- dry mouth

Sometimes there may be inter-menstrual bleeding or spotting after menstruation. Quite often, ovarian apoplexy occurs after intercourse or training in the gym, when pressure in the abdomen has increased or ovarian tissue has experienced some stress. However, rupture of ovarian tissue can occur in conjunction with other diseases.

== Pathogenesis ==
During a normal ovarian cycle (which accompanies the menstrual cycle) of a sexually mature woman, one or more follicles grow in the ovaries. The oocyte in the follicle matures to prepare for potential fertilisation. As the cycle progresses, a smaller number of dominant follicles (typically only one) begin to stand out, and reach a maximum size of about 20mm around the middle point of cycle. By this stage, the oocyte has finished maturing into an ovum (an egg), and ovulation occurs - the follicle ruptures and releases the ovum. A ruptured follicle forms a temporary cyst - a corpus luteum - which produces hormones to continue the cycle and mature the uterine lining.

In cases of dystrophic and sclerotic changes in ovarian tissue, acute and chronic inflammatory processes in the uterus, or in polyendocrine metabolic ovarian syndrome (PMOS) and some other diseases, as well as the result of medication that stimulate ovulation, certain irregularities in ovulation process and corpus luteum formation occur. As a result, blood vessels in the ovary contract, become dilated, and increase intra-ovarian bleeding. A hemorrhage can then occur in the corpus luteum due to the fragility of blood vessels, causing a hematoma. This is accompanied by pain, weakness, dizziness, nausea, vomiting, pale skin, and/or fainting. If left untreated, internal bleeding may increase and become a threat to the individual's health and life. Other possible causes of ovarian rupture include abdominal trauma, excessive physical stress, vigorous sexual intercourse, horseback riding, etc.

== Diagnosis ==
Typical complaints appear during the middle or second half of the menstrual cycle. On examination, there is marked soreness of the affected ovary, and positive symptoms of irritation of the peritoneum. In a general blood test, a marked decrease in hemoglobin levels can be seen (in the anemic and mixed forms of ovarian apoplexy). Pelvic ultrasound reveals in the affected ovary a large corpus luteum cyst with signs of hemorrhage in it and/or free fluid (blood) in the abdominal cavity. Because ovarian apoplexy is an acute surgical pathology, diagnosis must be confirmed rapidly, since delays between the event and surgical intervention increases the magnitude of blood loss and may be life-threatening.

=== Classification ===
1. Painful type – the primary symptom is pain, without signs of intraperitoneal bleeding.
2. Anemic type – the primary symptom is internal (abdominal) bleeding, without pain.
3. Mixed type – a combination of pain and intraperitoneal bleeding.

However, according to recent data, this classification is inadequate, because the ovary cannot rupture without bleeding.

Therefore, a new pathology has been devised in which the condition is divided according to severity: mild, moderate and severe (depending on the magnitude of blood loss).

== Treatment ==
Treatment depends on the type of ovary apoplexy and the severity of intra-abdominal bleeding, but the condition must be treated in a hospital. In the case of pain without signs of intra-abdominal bleeding, conservative therapy may be initiated, which includes bed rest, antispasmodics, and physiotherapy. In the presence or suspected internal bleeding, surgery is indicated via laparoscopy or laparotomy. Other treatments may include efforts to stop the bleeding or resection of the affected portion of the ovary. However, in cases in which there is extensive damage to the ovary, it may be necessary to remove it. After being discharged from the hospital, it is important to take steps to prevent a recurrence in the future. Such steps include avoiding risk factors or beginning a regimen of oral contraceptives to control ovarian activity.
