= On Semen =

Medical treatise by Galen

On Semen (De Semine), also known as On the Seed (Peri spermatos) is a medical treatise written by the Greek physician Galen. In this work, Galen writes about the physiology of animal reproduction, provides detailed anatomical descriptions of the reproductive organs and their purposes, and also deals with inheritance and embryology. The first book of On Semen is about the contribution of the male to reproduction, and the second book deals with the contribution of the female. Galen wrote it in the 170s, during his second stay in Rome. It was meant for a large audience that did not need much prior medical knowledge to understand it.

The focus of On Semen is, firstly, to criticize Aristotle's concept of semen, and secondly, to propose a new one. Going against Aristotle's view that only males produce a reproductive fluid (semen), but agreeing with Hippocrates, Galen defends a two-seed theory which states there is both a male and a female semen, and that conception happens when the two mix together. Galen argues that the double origin of semen explains the differentiation of the sexes and how males and females inherit separate characteristics, and that this cannot be explained by genital differences alone as others believed.

Other corrections by Galen of Aristotle in this work include that of Aristotle's view that the testes do not produce sperm and that the male semen only acts as an efficient cause of reproduction. Galen also agreed with Aristotle in other areas, such as placing the origins of semen in the blood. Galen defined semen as "the active principle of the animal", whereas he said that the menstrual blood was the material principle. As the active principle, it informs the design of the body, whereas the material principle (the menstrual blood, which for Galen is the female semen) can be utilized for the construction of the body. For Galen, both played a role in hereditary transmission. Being larger, the testicles contribute more to this process than the ovaries. After conception, Galen proposes a description of the development of the fetus, partly modelled off of the stages of the development of plants: an initial phase of semen, followed by an undifferentiated growth, followed by a differentiation of the three main organs (brain, heart, liver), followed by a complete formation and differentiation of all the parts.

Galen believed that the body is made of four elements (water, air, earth, and fire) and that they are distributed differently among men and women, so that men have a greater proportion of the property of hotness and dryness whereas women have more coldness and moisture. Galen also believed that the male offspring develops on the right side of the ovaries but the female offspring on the left side.

In 1992, Philipp DeLacy published a critical edition, along with an English translation and commentary, on the work. A brief selected translation was also published in 2012.

== Manuscripts ==
On Semen survives in multiple different forms, through Greek manuscripts and many translations, including: one complete sixteenth-century Greek manuscript (Parisinus Gr. 2279), another fifteenth-century Greek manuscript containing Book 1 (Mosquensis Gr. 466), the Aldine Greek edition published in 1525 (representing a tradition distinct from the two Greek manuscripts), the Arabic translation made by the school of Hunayn ibn Ishaq, and the Latin translation made by Niccolo da Reggio.

== Editions and translations ==
The standard critical edition and English translation of Galen's On Semen was published in 1992 by Philipp De Lacy. The Berlin-Brandenburg Academy of Sciences hosts it for free to read online.

A scholarly Greek edition of Galen's On Semen was published in 1822, in Volume 4 of a 20-volume series of Galen's complete works edited by Karl Gottlob Kühn, titled Claudii Galeni Opera Omnia ("The Complete Works of Claudius Galen"). This edition is now available online via the Perseus Digital Library.

== Similar works ==
Galen wrote one more major treatise about embryology about twenty years after On Semen, this one being titled On the Formation of the Feotus. Soranus of Ephesus also wrote a work titled On Semen. Galen's On Semen is also different from a Pseudo-Galenic work called De spermate.

== See also ==
- Galenic corpus
- Peri Alypias
