= Vilhelm Magnus =

Vilhelm Magnus (1871–1929) was a Norwegian-American neurosurgeon.

== Biography ==
Magnus born in Fillmore County, Minnesota, United States a Norwegian family. He received his early education in Bergen. Later, he attended a university in Oslo. After graduating in Oslo, he began clinical training in neurology and was among a group of neurologists dissatisfied with the prevailing therapeutic nihilism toward nervous system diseases. Influenced by Victor Horsley, Magnus focused on surgically treatable neurological conditions and worked to establish the field of neurological surgery in Norway.

Magnus published his first scientific paper in 1899. In 1901, he demonstrated the importance of the corpus luteum in the first three weeks of pregnancy. By 1903, he showed interest in the surgical treatment of brain tumors.
