= Abdominal apoplexy =

- Other names: Spontaneous intra-abdominal hemorrhage
- Treatment: Emergency surgery

Abdominal apoplexy, also called spontaneous intra-abdominal hemorrhage or idiopathic spontaneous intraperitoneal hemorrhage (ISIH), is a surgical emergency.

== Causes ==
There are many causes of internal bleeding in the abdomen. They include vascular causes, primarily ruptured (torn) blood vessels. Examples of these include a ruptured abdominal aortic aneurysm, or a rupture of any arterial visceral aneurysm (e.g., a torn hepatic artery) or varices associated with portal hypertension.

Among women, bleeding can be caused by a ruptured ectopic pregnancy, by uterine rupture, and by various problems that cause the ovaries or the ovarian artery to start bleeding, including ovarian cancer and corpus luteum cysts.

Inflammation, such as pancreatitis, spontaneous rupture of the spleen due to infectious mononucleosis, and polyarteritis nodosa can sometimes cause abdominal bleeding.

Tumors, both benign and cancerous, can cause rupture and acute bleeding in the liver, kidneys, gallbladder, adrenal gland, and other organs.

External causes of internal abdominal bleeding include the effects of anticoagulation therapy and physical trauma (e.g., from a fall, a car wreck, or a violent incident).

== Treatment ==
Treatment is abdominal surgery.
